= Cecile Licad =

Filipina classical pianist

Cecile Buencamino Licad (born 11 May 1961) is a Filipina classical pianist. She was born in Manila.

== Awards ==
- In 1981 Licad received the Leventritt Competition Gold Medal.
- Her recording of Chopin's Piano Concerto No. 2 and Saint-Saëns' Piano Concerto No. 2, with André Previn conducting the London Philharmonic, was awarded the Grand Prix du Disque Frédéric Chopin in 1985, in the piano and orchestra works category by the Chopin Society (Warsaw, Poland).

== Discography ==
- Rachmaninoff Piano Concerto No. 2 in C minor and Rhapsody on a Theme of Paganini, in A minor Op.43 with the Chicago Symphony Orchestra with Claudio Abbado conducting from CBS Masterworks Records (1984).
- Chopin Piano Concerto No. 2 and Saint-Saëns Piano Concerto No. 2 with André Previn conducting the London Philharmonic Orchestra from CBS Masterworks (1984).
- Schumann's Carnaval, Papillons and Toccata in C Major from Sony Classical (1990).
- Tchaikovsky Piano Trio in A minor ('In Memory of a Great Artist'), Op. 50 and Brahms Trio for horn (or viola or cello), violin & piano in E flat major, Op. 40 with Nadja Salerno-Sonnenberg, Antonio Meneses and John Cerminaro from EMI (1994).
- Cecile Licad Performs Chopin for Music Masters (1995).
- Franck & Brahms Sonatas: Salerno-Sonnenberg Licad with Nadja Salerno-Sonnenberg for EMI.
- Complete Beethoven Edition, Vol. 14: Misc. Chamber Works for Deutsche Grammophon (1997). Licad with Patrick Gallois on flute performing Beethoven's Six National Airs with Variations for Flute and Piano, Op. 105 and Ten National Airs with Variations for Flute and Piano, Op. 107.
- Ravel: Piano Works from Musical Heritage Society (1998).
- Summerfest La Jolla 1998 from La Jolla Chamber Music Society (1998).
- Marlboro Music Festival 50th Anniversary Album from Bridge Records (2001). Licad with Mieczyslaw Horszowski performing Beethoven's Three Marches for Piano, 4 hands, Op. 45.
- Santa Fe Chamber Music Festival: Haydn Guitar Quartet in D Major; Korngold Piano Quintet from Koch Classics (2002). Licad with Arnold Steinhardt, Benny Kim and Eric Kim performing Korngold's Piano Quintet in E Major, Op. 15.
- Louis Moreau Gottschalk: Piano Music from Naxos (2003).
- Casals Encores from Hyperion Records (2011) with Licad accompanying cellist Alban Gerhardt in an album of favorite encore pieces of Pablo Casals.
- Gabriel Fauré: Cello Sonatas (Hyperion Records, 2012) Alban Gerhardt cello and Cecile Licad piano
- Asia-Pacific Economic Forum cultural performance (2015)
- American First Sonatas (2016), Vol. 1 of Licad's Anthology of American Piano Music series, with sonatas by Alexander Reinagle, Edward MacDowell, and Charles Tomlinson Griffes.
- American Nocturnes (2017), Vol. 2 of Licad's Anthology of American Piano Music series, with nocturnes by George Crumb, Amy Beach, Charles Griffes, Louis Moreau Gottschalk, Daniel Gregory Mason, Ernest Bloch, Charles Tomlinson Griffes, Samuel Barber, Aaron Copland, Leo Ornstein, Marc-Andre Hamelin, George Whitefield Chadwick, Arthur Foote, Ferde Grofe, Joseph Lamb, Arthur Farwell, and Ernest Schelling.
- American Landscapes (2018), Vol. 3 of Licad's Anthology of American Piano Music series, with evocative landscape pieces by Aaron Copland, Anthony Heinrich, Percy Grainger, Daniel Gregory Mason, Edward MacDowell, Leo Ornstein, Arthur Farwell, William Grant Still, Roy Harris, and Charles Wakefield Cadman.
