= Rocaná =

Orchestral work by Unsuk Chin

Rocaná (Room of Light) is an orchestral composition written in 2008 by the South Korean composer Unsuk Chin. The work was commissioned by the Montreal Symphony Orchestra, the Bavarian State Opera, the Seoul Philharmonic Orchestra, and the Beijing Music Festival. Its world premiere was given by the Montreal Symphony Orchestra conducted by Kent Nagano at the Salle Wilfrid-Pelletier, Montreal, on March 3, 2008.

== Composition ==
Rocaná is cast in a single movement and lasts approximately 21 minutes. The title comes from the Sanskrit word meaning "room of light."

=== Instrumentation ===
The work is scored for a large orchestra comprising three flutes (1st doubling alto flute; 3rd doubling piccolo), three oboes (3rd doubling Cor anglais), three clarinets (3rd doubling bass clarinet), three bassoons (3rd doubling contrabassoon), six horns, four trumpets, trombone, two bass trombones, tuba, timpani, four percussionists, harp, piano, celesta, and strings.

== Reception ==
Rocaná has been praised by music critics. Anthony Tommasini of The New York Times called the piece "a knockout," writing, "It begins with a gnarly, clattering, explosion; call it the Little Bang. Then comes a pattern of background harmonies, always simmering, eerily quiet and pervasive. But throughout the work, jolts of energy keep happening: leaping lines, ominous 12-tonish themes that pierce the tranquil background buzz, outbursts of wailing brasses and metallic strings that come at you like a musical flamethrower." Christopher Dingle of BBC Music Magazine similarly wrote that "the orchestra reflects, refracts and distorts its material as if the sound is sent through combinations of prisms and mirrors. It is intended, and manages, to be a scintillating work, while not being the least bit showy."

== Recording ==
A recording of Rocaná, performed by the Montreal Symphony Orchestra conducted by Kent Nagano, was released alongside Unsuk Chin's Violin Concerto No. 1 by Analekta on March 24, 2009.
