= Donghoon Shin =

South Korean composer (born 1983)

- Born: 1983 (age 41–42); Seoul, South Korea
- Origin: South Korea
- Genres: Contemporary classical; experimental
- Occupation: Composer
- Years active: 2003-present
- Labels: Casa Ricordi
- Website: donghoonshin.com

Donghoon Shin (Korean: 신동훈; born 1983) is a South Korean composer of classical music.

== Education ==
Shin studied composition at Seoul National University with Sukhi Kang and Unsuk Chin before studying with Julian Anderson at the Guildhall School of Music and George Benjamin at King's College, London.

His works have been performed by ensembles such as the Seattle Symphony, London Symphony Orchestra, Berlin Philharmonic, Ensemble Recherche, and Ensemble Intercontemporain.

In 2016 Shin won the Royal Philharmonic Society Composition Prize and in 2019 he was awarded the UK Critics’ Circle Music Award for Young Talent. Shin was also the winner of the Claudio Abbado Composition Prize of the Karajan Academy of the Berliner Philharmonic in 2022.

Shin's music is published by Boosey & Hawkes.
