= Wu Wei (musician) =

Wu Wei 吴巍
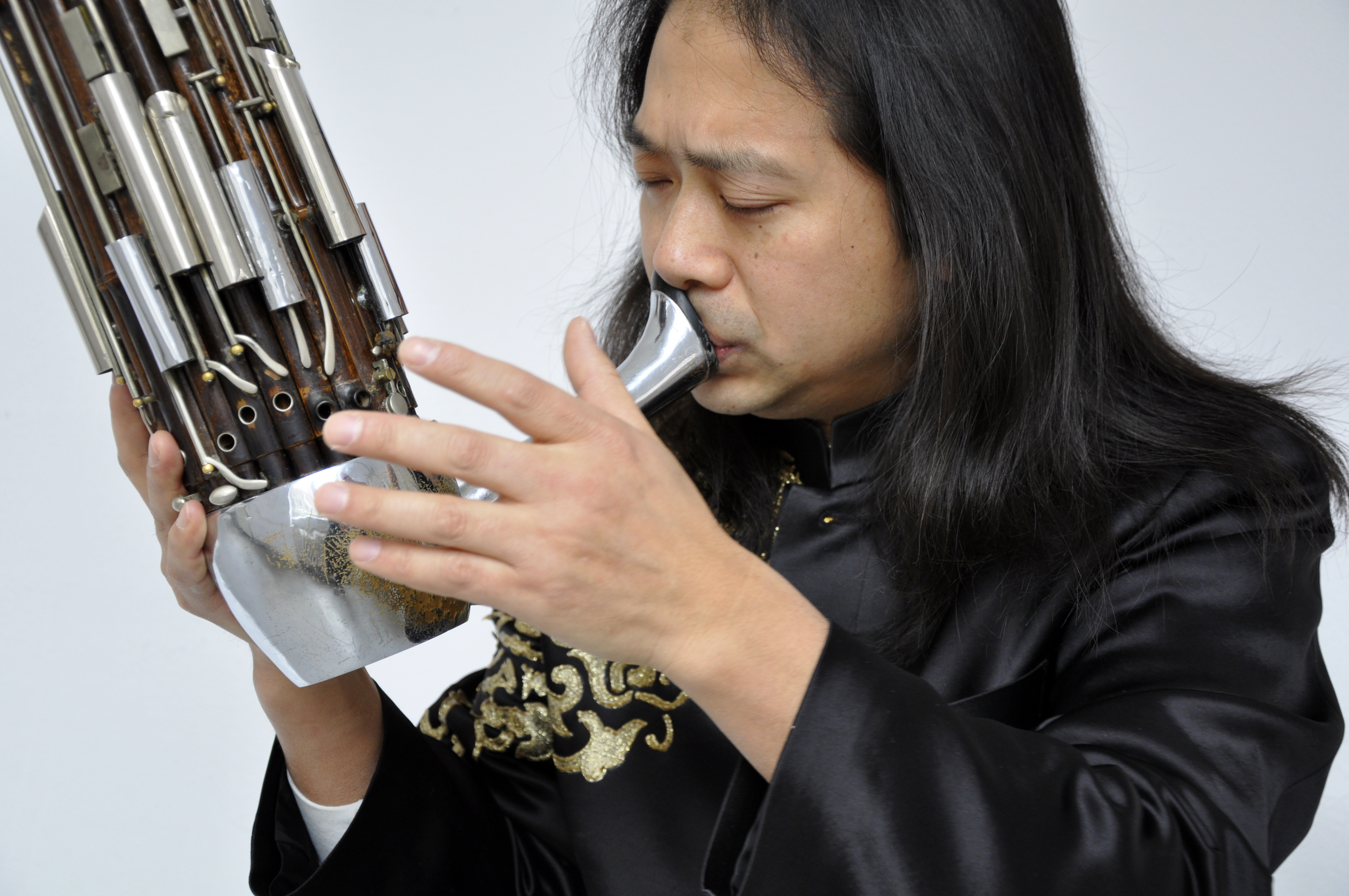

Background information
- Born: April 29, 1970 (age 56); Gaoyou, Jiangsu, China
- Occupation: Musician
- Instrument: Sheng
- Website: https://wuwei-music.com/

Wu Wei (born April 29, 1970) is a Chinese musician, composer, and sheng player based in Germany. He performs traditional Chinese repertoire but also European baroque and classical works, as well as contemporary avant-garde music and jazz.

== Biography ==
Wu Wei was born in Gaoyou, China. He studied sheng at the Shanghai Conservatory of Music. He received a DAAD scholarship in 1995, enabling him to study at the Hanns Eisler Music Conservatory in Berlin, where he is now based.

=== Musical career ===
He settled in Germany after beginning his studies there.

He recorded a concerto for shenge and orchestra by Composer Unsuk Chin with the Seoul Philharmonic Orchestra conducted by Myung-whun Chung. This concerto was one of three for the album Unsuk Chin:3 Concertos, recorded by the Deutsche Grammophon record label.

He has been a soloist with various orchestras including the Berlin Philharmonic, Seoul Philharmonic, BBC Symphony, the Metropole Orkest, as well as other groups such as the Atlas Ensemble.

As a sheng player, he has helped this instrument, with a four thousand-year history, to become popular in Europe and aided the development of its contemporary repertoire. He has developed new playing techniques, commissioned new repertoire, and integrated different genres and styles, as through his exposure to western music styles, he adopted improvisational techniques not usually explored in Chinese traditional music. In his own words:

In Germany, I was exposed to jazz, improvisation, classical music, music from different cultures and it opened a different way for me. Previously, my professor had done great work to develop the instrument physically, in doing so he extended its repertoire whilst respecting its tradition. So, with this new style of sheng, I could play traditional Chinese music but also other music.

Wu Wei has premiered more than 200 works for sheng including 10 concertos for sheng and orchestra. He has premiered works by Fang Man, Jukka Tiensuu, Unsuk Chin, John Cage, Enjott Schneider, Toshio Hosokawa, Jörg Widmann, Tan Dun, Chen Qigang, Guo Wenjing, Ruo Huang and Guus Janssen.

Wu Wei is also a composer, particularly for sheng, and several organizations have commissioned works from him including the Foundation Royaument, the Saechsischen Culture Foundation, Musica Viva, and the Theatre Malakoff.

== Awards ==
- 1996 - Musica Vitale Competition Germany
- 2002 - Musica Vitale Competition Germany
- 2004 - Premio “Global Root” German world music
- 2015 - International Classical Music Award
- 2015 - BBC Music Magazine Award

== Recorded works ==
- Wu Wei: Sheng - Organ For The Mouth. Melisma, 1998
- Unsuk Chin: 3 Concertos: Piano Concerto / Cello Concerto / Šu for Sheng and Orchestra. Deutsche Grammophon, 2014
- Erratic Wish Machine. Stefan Schultze - Large Ensemble, Wu Wei. WhyPlayJazz, 2015
- John Cage: Two3. Stefan Hussong & Wu Wei. Wergo, 2015
- Automated Shadows. Insight Music, 2017
- Silk Baroque, Wu Wei, Holland Baroque. PentaTone Classics, 2019

== See also ==
- Jazz in China
