= Clarinet Concerto (Unsuk Chin) =

2014 musical composition by Unsuk Chin

Unsuk Chin's Clarinet Concerto was written in 2014 on a joint commission from the Gothenburg Symphony Orchestra, WDR Symphony Orchestra Cologne, Philharmonia Orchestra (with support of The Meyer Foundation), Barcelona Symphony Orchestra, and the New York Philharmonic (with support of The Francis Goelet Fund). A partial premiere of piece was given by the clarinetist Kari Kriikku and the Gothenburg Symphony Orchestra conducted by Kent Nagano at the Gothenburg Concert Hall on May 8, 2014; the complete concerto was given its world premiere by Kriikku and the New York Philharmonic conducted by Alan Gilbert at Avery Fisher Hall on September 23, 2014.

== Composition ==
The concerto has a duration of about 25 minutes and is cast in three movements:

1. Mirage – Fanfare – Ornament
2. Hymnos (Hymn)
3. Improvisation on a Groove

=== Instrumentation ===
The work is scored for solo clarinet and an orchestra comprising three flutes (2nd doubling alto flute; 3rd doubling piccolo), three oboes (3rd doubling Cor anglais), four clarinets (4th doubling bass clarinet), three bassoons (3rd doubling contrabassoon), four horns, four trumpets, three trombones, tuba, timpani, four percussionists, piano (doubling celesta), harp, and strings.

== Reception ==
The concerto has been generally praised by music critics. Anthony Tommasini of The New York Times described it as "haunting," writing, "At the opening, the solo clarinet plays breathy, staggered phrases, soon joined by quizzical stirrings in the orchestra. The effect is not spooky, but spellbinding. The music unfolds in fits and starts, with the clarinet breaking loose like some avant-garde jazz improviser, and the orchestra erupting in dense chords that sound like drive-by whooshes." Richard Fairman of the Financial Times similarly wrote, "At times the concerto feels like a musical, out-of-body experience." Ivan Hewett of The Daily Telegraph further remarked, "Normally the soloist is set up in heroic opposition to the orchestra. But here the dialogue was conducted on strikingly different terms. At the beginning, the virtuoso Finnish soloist Kari Kriiku let forth a quiet, unearthly sound, as if his instrument was possessed by ghosts. When he stopped, it seemed as if his sound had left a smear on the air. It was an astonishing aural mirage, brought on by a few players in the orchestra who picked up the clarinet's sound." He added, "This sort of game, where soloist and orchestra swap roles, and often you can't tell where a sound is coming from, is regularly played by modern composers. The game often does no more than tease one's ears, but here it actually engaged the heart and imagination. At times the music developed a threatening force, but just as it was about to explode, an unexpected calm descended – which made the violence more inexplicable, and more scary."

Andrew Clements of The Guardian was more critical of the piece, however, remarking, "...for all the awe-inspiring pyrotechnics, musically the piece leaves a rather lightweight impression, and at first hearing it doesn't seem to be the major addition to the clarinet repertoire that, for instance, the concerto that Magnus Lindberg composed for Kriikku in 2002 most certainly is." He added, "Compared with some of Chin's other concertos, such as the outstanding work for cello that she composed six years ago for Alban Gerhardt, there's little dialogue between the solo instrument and the orchestra, which plays a much more subdued and conventional background role than it usually does in her music. Here, there is little evidence of her fabulous ear for inventive sonorities or of her very personal take on tonality and harmony."
