= Alice in Wonderland (opera) =

Opera by Unsuk Chin

- Opera by Unsuk Chin
- Librettist: Unsuk Chin and David Henry Hwang
- Based on: Alice's Adventures in Wonderlandand Through the Looking-Glass by Lewis Carroll
- Premiere: June 2007; Bavarian State Opera

Alice in Wonderland is a 2007 operatic adaptation of the novels Alice's Adventures in Wonderland (1865) and Through the Looking-Glass (1871) by Lewis Carroll. It is the first opera of Korean composer Unsuk Chin, who co-wrote the English libretto with the Asian-American playwright David Henry Hwang.

It had its world premiere on 30 June 2007. However, the jacket and notice of the DVD of the world premiere indicate that the recording was made on 27 June at the Bavarian State Opera as part of the 2007 Munich Opera Festival. Conducted by Kent Nagano and featuring Sally Matthews in the title role and Dame Gwyneth Jones as the Queen of Hearts, the production was hailed as World Premiere of the Year by the German opera magazine Opernwelt. A DVD was subsequently released by Euroarts.

The American Premier took place in 2012 at Opera Theatre of Saint Louis conducted by Michael Christie under the direction of James Robinson featuring Ashley Emerson, Tracy Dahl, Jenni Bank, David Trudgen, Aubrey Allicock, and Julie Makerov.

The most notable subsequent production was a co-production with the Los Angeles Philharmonic and The Barbican Center in London. The LA production was conceived by director Netia Jones and conducted in Los Angeles by Susanna Mälkki and in London by Baldur Brönnimann. The cast featured Rachele Gilmore, Andrew Watts, Marie Arnet, Jenni Bank, Jane Henschel, and Dietrich Henschel.

The Opera also exists in a condensed concert version which has been performed by the Royal Stockholm Philharmonic, The Bergen Philharmonic in Bergen and Oslo, and the Seoul Philharmonic. This version originated for Soprano and Alto but a Baritone was added for the Seoul version. The concert version has been performed by Sally Matthews (soprano), Rachele Gilmore (soprano), Jenni Bank (mezzo-soprano), and Dietrich Henschel (baritone).

== Roles ==
Role	Voice type	Premiere cast, June 2007 Conductor: Kent Nagano	American premiere cast, June 2012 Conductor: Michael Christie
Alice	soprano	Sally Matthews	
Cheshire Cat	soprano	Piia Komsi/Julia Rempe	
Mad Hatter/Duck	baritone	Dietrich Henschel	
White Rabbit/Badger/March Hare	countertenor	Andrew Watts	
Mouse/Pat/Cook/Dormouse/Invisible Man	tenor	Guy de Mey	
Ugly Duchess/Owl/Two	mezzo-soprano	Cynthia Jansen	
Queen of Hearts	dramatic soprano	Gwyneth Jones	
King of Hearts/Old Man #2/Crab	bass	Steven Humes	
Frog-Footman/Seven/Dodo	bass	Rudiger Trebes	
Caterpillar	solo bass clarinet	Stefan Schneider	
Eaglet/Old Man #1/Executioner/Fish-Footman/Five	tenor	Christian Rieger	
Chorus of Baby Animals, Creatures, Royal Entourage, 12 Jurors, Children, and Royal Children

== Scenes ==
- Scene I – Dream I
- Scene II – The Pool of Tears
- Scene III – In the House of the White Rabbit
- Interlude I – Advice from a Caterpillar
- Scene IV – Pig and Pepper
- Scene V – A Mad Tea Party
- Scene VI – The Croquet Ground
- Interlude II
- Scene VII – The Trial or Who Stole the Tarts?
- Finale – Dream II
