= Piano Concerto (Unsuk Chin) =

Composition by Unsuk Chin

Unsuk Chin's Piano Concerto was composed between 1996 and 1997 on a commission from the BBC for the BBC National Orchestra of Wales. The piece was first performed by the pianist Rolf Hind and the BBC National Orchestra of Wales conducted by Mark Wigglesworth at St David's Hall, Cardiff, on 6 June 1997.

== Composition ==
The concerto has a duration of roughly 25 minutes and is cast in four numbered movements. The work is scored for solo piano and a large orchestra comprising two flutes (2nd doubling piccolo), two oboes (2nd doubling cor anglais), two clarinets, two bassoons, two horns, two trumpets, two trombones, tuba, two-to-three percussionists, celesta, harp, mandolin, and strings.

== Reception ==
The Piano Concerto has received a mostly positive reception from music critics. Reviewing a recording of the work performed by Sunwook Kim and the Seoul Philharmonic Orchestra conducted by Myung-whun Chung, Arnold Whittall of Gramophone observed, "The Piano Concerto owes an explicit debt to her teacher, Ligeti, but it also represents a gesture of independence. Its coruscating toccatas and interlocking rhythmic patterns acquire a distinctive luminosity in structures that constantly evolve and threaten disorientation, only to find new ways of suggesting stability. The piece works well when given the kind of effortlessly precise and virtuoso interpretation from both soloist and orchestra that it receives here." Andrew Clements of The Guardian also noted similarities to the music of Ligeti, writing, "...the solo writing often seems close to that of Ligeti's Piano Studies with extra layers of orchestral decoration added, though as the soloist Sunwook Kim shows, the total effect is undeniably brilliant and effective."
