= Rachele Gilmore =

American opera singer

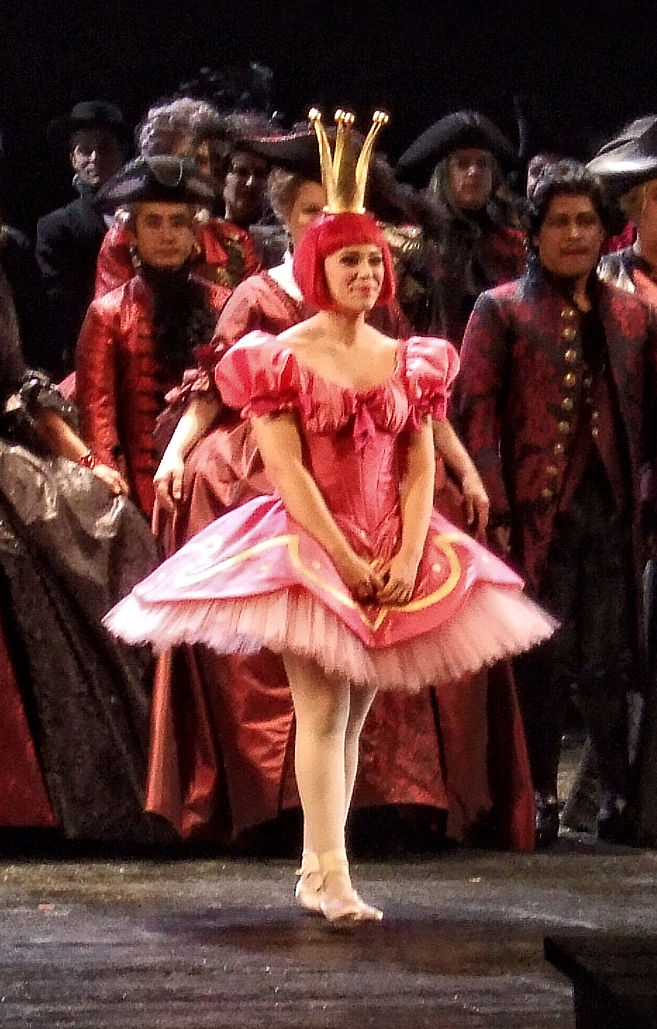
- Gilmore bows after making her Metropolitan Opera debut in The Tales of Hoffmann, December 23, 2009

Background information
- Origin: Atlanta, Georgia
- Genres: Opera
- Occupation: Singer (Soprano coloratura)
- Years active: 2009-present
- Website: https://www.rachelegilmore.com/

Rachele Gilmore (born 1981, Georgia) is an American coloratura soprano, originally from Atlanta, Georgia.

Gilmore earned her bachelor of music from Indiana University School of Music and continued with graduate studies at Boston University. After her unscheduled major debut, she was compared to Mado Robin.

== Career ==
Gilmore made her professional opera debut in 2004 at the Glimmerglass Opera as The Lady Saphir in Gilbert and Sullivan's Patience. In 2007 she portrayed Zerlina in the Orlando Opera Company and Amato Opera Theatre's co-production of Don Giovanni which starred Peter Edelmann in the title role. In 2009 she performed the part of Zerbinetta in the Indianapolis Opera's production Richard Strauss's Ariadne auf Naxos; a part she later reprised at the Boston Lyric Opera in 2010 and the Glimmerglass Festival in 2014.

Gilmore made her unexpected debut at the Metropolitan Opera on 23 December 2009 as the cover for Kathleen Kim in the role of Olympia in the opera The Tales of Hoffmann. She had less than four hours' notice that she would sing that night, and the curtain was even briefly held past 20:00 to allow her to walk the stage. She interpolated a high A-flat (A♭_{6}) into Olympia's aria, which, at the time, was conjectured to be the highest note to have ever been sung on the stage of the Met. She later sang the role of Olympia at La Scala in 2012, the Bavarian State Opera in 2014, the Hawaii Opera Theatre in 2017, and the Teatro Colón in 2019.

In 2010 Gilmore performed the title role in the Swiss premiere of Unsuk Chin's Alice in Wonderland at the Grand Théâtre de Genève; a role she later performed again with the Los Angeles Opera and Los Angeles Philharmonic in 2015. In 2011 she appeared at the Knoxville Opera as Elvira in I puritani and as Le Feu in L'Enfant et les sortilèges at the Bavarian State Opera. In 2012 she sang the role of Cunegonde in Candide with the Portland Opera.

In 2013 Gilmore made her debut at the Opéra de Lille in the title role of Lucia di Lammermoor. She later sang that role again at the Virginia Opera in 2018. Also in 2013, Gilmore appeared at La Monnaie as Ophelia in Hamlet; portrayed the Queen of the Night in The Magic Flute with Opera Philadelphia; and appeared as Amina in the Florida Grand Opera's production of La sonnambula. In 2014 she performed the role of Gilda in Rigoletto with both Opera Omaha and Opera Colorado.

In 2015 Gilmore portrayed Blonde in the Aix-en-Provence Festival's production of Die Entführung aus dem Serail; a role she repeated that year at the Théâtre des Champs-Elysées. In 2016 she portrayed Gretel in Hansel and Gretel for her debut at the Lyric Opera of Kansas City. That same year she sang the role of Sophie in Werther at the Boston Lyric Opera, and returned to the Glimmerglass Festival as Ninetta in La gazza ladra in addition to performing as the soprano soloist in Joseph Haydn's The Creation with the Los Angeles Philharmonic.

In 2017 Gilmore made her debut at the Austin Lyric Opera as Marie in The Daughter of the Regiment, and in 2018 she returned to Opera Omaha as Nanette in Falstaff.
