= Albert Cano Smit =

Spanish-Dutch pianist

- Born: October 4, 1996 (age 30); Geneva, Switzerland
- Genre: Classical
- Occupation: Classical Pianist
- Instrument: Piano
- Years active: 2014–present
- Formerly of: Walter W. Naumburg Foundation; The Juilliard School; Colburn School; Escolania de Montserrat; Young Concert Artists; San Diego Symphony Orchestra

Albert Cano Smit (born in Geneva, Switzerland on October 4, 1996) is a Spanish-Dutch classical pianist. He has won first prize at the prestigious 2017 Naumburg International Piano Competition and the Young Concert Artists Competition in 2019.

== Early life ==
Cano Smit began his musical studies at the Escolania de Montserrat, and his collegiate studies with Ory Shihor at the Colburn Conservatory of Music in Los Angeles. He was then accepted to the Juilliard School in New York City where he pursued his graduate studies with Robert McDonald and received the Arthur Rubinstein Prize in Piano. Other notable mentors include Jean-Yves Thibaudet, Richard Goode and Stephen Hough.

== Career ==
Cano Smit first came to public attention at the 2017 Montreal International Piano Competition, where he placed as a finalist. For his performances, he was lauded as "a great artist in the making" who had committed a "virtual near-suicide" with his finals concerto choice. He won his first major competition when he was awarded the first prize at the Naumburg International Piano Competition in November 2017. His second major competition win came in November 2019 at the Young Concert Artists Competition, where he was the recipient of 6 special prizes.

Since his victory at the Naumburg Competition, he has performed solo recitals at the Fondation Louis Vuitton in Paris, Herbst Theatre in San Francisco, Zankel Halls, Kennedy Center in Washington DC, L'Auditori de Barcelona, Wissembourg Festival in France, Rheingau Musik Festival in Germany, and Grand Banlam Theater in Xiamen.

He has given concerto performances with international ensembles, including the Boca del Río Philharmonic, Seattle Symphony Orchestra, Montreal Symphony Orchestra, Barcelona Symphony and Catalonia National Orchestra, San Diego Symphony as well as the Las Vegas Philharmonic.

In October 2019 he made his Carnegie Hall debut, where he world premiered Stephen Hough's Partita for Piano, a piece commissioned for Hough by the Walter W. Naumburg Foundation.

He currently resides in New York City.

== Major competition results ==
Date	Competition	Prize
Nov 2017	Naumburg International Piano Competition	First Prize
Nov 2019	Young Concert Artists	Competition Winner (6 Special Prizes)
