= Charlotte Lee =

Charlotte Lee may refer to:

- Charlotte Lee, Countess of Lichfield (1664–1718), illegitimate daughter of King Charles II of England and Scotland, and Barbara Villiers
- Charlotte Lee, Lady Baltimore (1678–1721), daughter of the above
- Charlotte Lee (artist manager)
- Elio (Welsh-Canadian singer), Welsh-Canadian singer, born Charlotte Lee
