= Frontispiece =

Frontispiece may refer to:

- Frontispiece (books), a decorative illustration facing a book's title page
- Frontispiece (architecture), the combination of elements that frame and decorate the main, or front, door to a building
- Frontispiece (Unsuk Chin), orchestral work by Unsuk Chin
