= Kim Ji-yeon =

Kim Ji-yeon, Kim Ji-yŏn, Kim Chi-yŏn, or Kim Chee-yun (Korean: 김지연) may refer to:

- Kim Chee-yun (born 1970), South Korean violinist
- Kim Ji-yeon (fencer) (born 1988), South Korean fencer
- Ji Yeon Kim (fighter) (born 1989), South Korean mixed martial artist
- Kei (singer) (Kim Ji-yeon, born 1995), South Korean singer, member of the girl group Lovelyz
- Bona (singer) (Kim Ji-yeon, born 1995), South Korean singer, member of the girl group Cosmic Girls
