= Subito con forza =

Orchestral work by Unsuk Chin

Subito con forza (Suddenly with power) is a short orchestral composition written in 2020 by the South Korean composer Unsuk Chin. The work was written on a joint commission from BBC Radio 3, the Kölner Philharmonie, and the Royal Concertgebouw Orchestra. Its world premiere was given by the Royal Concertgebouw Orchestra conducted by Klaus Mäkelä at the Concertgebouw, Amsterdam, on 24 September 2020. The score is inscribed, "On the occasion of the 250th anniversary of Beethoven's birth."

== Composition ==
Subito con forza is composed in a single movement and lasts about 5 minutes.

=== Instrumentation ===
The work is scored for an orchestra consisting of two flutes, two oboes, two clarinets, two bassoons, two horns, two trumpets, timpani, two percussionists, piano, and strings.

== Performance History ==
Following its premiere in Amsterdam, the piece has been performed by a variety of orchestras both professional and student. Its UK premiere was given by Mark Elder and The Hallé at BBC Proms in 2021; its US premiere by the Minnesota Orchestra and David Afkham; its Italian premiere by Fabio Luisi and RAI Orchestra, and its Canadian premiere by the Toronto Symphony Orchestra. Other groups to have played the work include the Boston Symphony Orchestra, American Youth Symphony, McGill Symphony Orchestra, and Ireland's National Symphony Orchestra.

== Reception ==
Subito con forza has been praised by music critics. Ken Walton of The Scotsman called it a "truculent" tribute to Beethoven "in which fleeting snippets of original Beethoven act as touchpaper to Chin's own explosive responses." Neil Fisher of The Times similarly describe the piece as "effective and eerie, with plenty happening in five teeming minutes." Likewise, Joshua Kosman of the San Francisco Chronicle called it "a brief five-minute curtain-raiser" that "takes a gesture from the composer's 'Coriolan' Overture and dances it around through a series of oratorical pronouncements and clattery percussion."
