= Modigliani Quartet =

French string quartet

- Origin: Paris, France
- Years active: 2003–present
- Label: Mirare
- Members: Amaury Coeytaux, Loïc Rio (violin); Laurent Marfaing (viola); François Kieffer (cello)
- Website: modiglianiquartet.com

The Modigliani Quartet (French: Quatuor Modigliani) is a French string quartet founded in Paris in 2003 by four close friends, following their studies at the Conservatoire de Paris. Founding violinist Philippe Bernhard left the group in 2016 and was replaced by Amaury Coeytaux.

== History ==
The founding members studied with the Ysaÿe Quartet in Paris, attended classes by Walter Levin and György Kurtág in 2004, and had the opportunity to work with the Artemis Quartet at the Universität der Künste in Berlin in 2005. They first drew attention by winning the Frits Philips String Quartet competition in Eindhoven (2004), the Vittorio Rimbotti competition in Florence (2005) and the Young Concert Artists Auditions in New York (2006).

In 2014 the quartet became artistic directors of the Rencontres musicales d'Évian. After a 13-year pause, this festival, created in 1976 by Antoine Riboud and made famous by its former artistic director Mstislav Rostropovich, began a new life through the joint efforts of the Evian Resort and the Modigliani Quartet.

== Members ==
- Amaury Coeytaux: violin
- Loïc Rio: violin
- Laurent Marfaing: viola
- François Kieffer: cello

Before joining the group, Coeytaux had been concertmaster of the Orchestre Philharmonique de Radio France.

== Instruments ==
The Modigliani Quartet plays on four Italian instruments: Amaury Coeytaux plays a 1783 violin by Giovanni Battista Guadagnini, Loic Rio plays a 1734 violin by Alessandro Gagliano, Laurent Marfaing plays a 1660 viola by Luigi Mariani, François Kieffer plays a 1706 cello by Matteo Goffriller (former "Warburg").

== Collaborations ==
The quartet regularly plays chamber music with Sabine Meyer, Renaud Capuçon, Nicholas Angelich, Jean-Frédéric Neuburger, Marie-Elisabeth Hecker, Daniel Müller-Schott and various friends.

== Discography ==
- Schumann-Wolf-Mendelssohn - Nascor, Ysaÿe Records, 2006 (Schumann: quartet op. 41 no. 1; Wolf: "Italian Serenade"; Mendelssohn: quartet op. 44 no. 1)
- Haydn - Mirare Records, 2008 (quartets op. 76 no. 4 "Sunrise", op. 74 no. 3 "The rider", op. 54 no. 1)
- Mendelssohn - Mirare Records, 2010 (quartets in a minor op. 13, in f minor op. 80, Capriccio op. 81 no. 3)
- Brahms - Mirare Records, 2011 (piano quintet op. 34 w/ Jean-Frédéric Neuburger, Zwei Gësange op. 91 w/ Andrea Hill)
- Intuition - Mirare Records, 2012 (Arriaga: quartet no. 2, Mozart: quartet no. 6 K 159, Schubert: quartet no. 4 D 46)
- Debussy-Ravel-Saint-Saëns - Mirare Records, 2013 (Debussy: quartet in g minor, Ravel: quartet in f major, Saint-Saëns: quartet no. 1)
- Haydn - Mirare Records, 2014 (quartets op. 50 no. 1, op. 76 no. 1, op. 77 no. 1)
- Schumann - Opus 41 set
- Schubert - Complete String Quartets, Mirare Records, 2022
- Grieg - Smetana - Mirare, 2024
