= Karen Gomyo =

Canadian-Japanese-American musician based in Europe

- Born: 12 January 1982 (age 44); Tokyo, Japan
- Genres: Classical
- Occupation: Violinist
- Instrument: Violin
- Years active: 1997–present
- Website: karengomyo.com

Karen Gomyo (born 12 January 1982) is a classical violinist.

== Biography ==
Karen Gomyo was born in Tokyo, Japan and grew up in Montreal, Quebec, Canada, where she started violin lessons at 5 years old. At the age of 10, she moved to New York City to study at the Juilliard School at the invitation of the pedagogue Dorothy DeLay. At 15, Gomyo won the Young Concert Artists International Auditions, launching her international career as soloist and chamber musician.

Besides her work with the esteemed orchestras, venues, and colleagues around the world, Gomyo has participated in a 2014 documentary film about Antonio Stradivarius called "The Mysteries of the Supreme Violin", in which she is violinist, guide, and narrator, and which was broadcast worldwide on NHK World. She was also invited to perform at the First Symposium for the Victims of Terrorism held at the United Nations headquarters in New York in 2011.

Karen Gomyo is also acclaimed for her interpretation of the Nuevo Tango music and has worked with Astor Piazzolla's longtime pianist and tango artist Pablo Ziegler and his partners Hector del Curto (bandoneon), Claudio Ragazzi (electric guitar), and Pedro Giraudo (double bass).

== Education ==
Gomyo attended the Pre-College and College divisions of the Juilliard School, the Indiana University Jacobs School of Music, and the New England Conservatory of Music, where she graduated with an Artist Diploma. Her teachers and mentors have included Mauricio Fuks, Dorothy DeLay, Donald Weilerstein, and cellist Heinrich Schiff.
