= Nathan Lee =

- Born: 26 September 2001 (age 23)
- Genres: Classical music
- Occupation: Classical pianist
- Instrument: Piano
- Years active: 2007–present

Nathan Hongwon Lee (born September 26, 2001) is a Korean-American pianist. Described by The New York Times as a "prodigiously talented" pianist with "musical insight and sensitivity", Lee was a winner of the 2016 Young Concert Artists International Auditions.

== Career ==
Lee was born in 2001 and began playing the piano at the age of six. At the age of 15, Lee was one of four winners in the 2016 Young Concert Artists International Auditions, and won a record fourteen additional concert prizes (opportunities to perform). Lee was later named to the Mortimer Levitt Piano Chair of Young Concert Artists and has since appeared as soloist with major American orchestras such as the Seattle Symphony, the Cleveland Orchestra, the Orchestra of St. Luke's, the Minnesota Orchestra, and the Buffalo Philharmonic. Lee has collaborated with such conductors as Jorge Mester, JoAnn Falletta, Teddy Abrams, Jahja Ling, and Ludovic Morlot.
