= Daniel Kellogg (composer) =

American composer (born 1976)

Daniel Kellogg (born 1976) is an American composer. Kellogg is Assistant Professor of Music at the College of Music of the University of Colorado at Boulder, teaching music composition, counterpoint and orchestration.

== Life ==
Kellogg was born in Wilton, Connecticut. He received his Bachelor of Music in 1999 from the Curtis Institute of Music in Philadelphia, and Master of Music in 2001, Master of Musical Arts in 2003, and Doctor of Musical Arts in 2007 from the Yale School of Music. He also studied at Indiana University School of Music (1994–1996), the Aspen Music Festival and School (1995–1996), and the Norfolk Chamber Music Festival as a 1997 fellow. His teachers have included Martin Bresnick, Jacob Druckman, Don Freund, Jennifer Higdon, Ezra Laderman, Ned Rorem, and Joseph Schwantner.

== Career ==
Kellogg's music has been performed by the National Symphony Orchestra, Colorado Symphony Orchestra, the Philadelphia Orchestra, the San Diego Symphony, the Kansas City Symphony, the Green Bay Symphony, the South Dakota Symphony, the Santa Barbara Symphony, the Yale Philharmonic, the Ensemble Orchestral de Paris, the President's Own United States Marine Band, the Ying Quartet, the Aspen Contemporary Ensemble, eighth blackbird, the Jupiter String Quartet, and the Pittsburgh New Music Ensemble, among others in such venues as Carnegie’s Weill Recital Hall, Alice Tully Hall, the Library of Congress, the Smithsonian's Hirshhorn Museum and the National Gallery of Art, the Philadelphia Museum of Art, and the Caramoor Music Festival. His music has been broadcast on National Public Radio’s "Performance Today," New York's WQXR, and China National Radio.

Among his numerous notable commissions include Divinum Mysterium for eighth blackbird, which was received with critical acclaim in 2000 and released on eighth blackbird's CD, Beginnings. In 2000, he won the William Schuman Prize. In 2002, he won the Young Concert Artists composition competition. In 2005, Kellogg won a commission from the Philadelphia Orchestra to write a work celebrating the 300th birthday of Benjamin Franklin, which he titled Ben. In celebration of the orchestra's 90th anniversary, in 2016 he received a commission from the Colorado Springs Philharmonic composing Halcyon Skies from Katharine Lee Bates's original poem America the Beautiful. "The phrase was later changed to 'spacious skies' and both terms reflect the open vistas and beautiful blue skies that define Colorado" said Kellogg. The World Premiere of Halcyon Skies was performed by the Colorado Springs Philharmonic at the Pikes Peak Center for the Performing Arts on January 21, 2017 with Kellogg in attendance. Kellogg received a performance from the Colorado Symphony Orchestra of Refracted Skies, commissioned to celebrate the opening of the Denver Art Museum's new addition. Kellogg received a commission from the Kansas City Symphony, composing The Golden Spike to commemorate the 150th anniversary of the transcontinental railroad. The Golden Spike received its world premiere in Kansas City's Kauffman Center for the Performing Arts on October 4, 2019. Writing the next day for KC Studio Magazine, reviewer Libby Hansen noted "For The Golden Spike, Kellogg explored the power, glory, and pain of rampant, unhindered progress, bringing out these elements in the race for a transcontinental railway, which was completed (May 10,) 1869." Kellogg has also received awards from the American Academy of Arts and Letters, the Barlow Endowment ASCAP, and Broadcast Music Incorporated.
