= Violin Concerto No. 2 (Unsuk Chin) =

Composition by Unsuk Chin

The Violin Concerto No. 2, Scherben der Stille (Shards of Silence), is the second violin concerto by the Korean composer Unsuk Chin. It was written for the violinist Leonidas Kavakos in 2021 on a joint commission from the London Symphony Orchestra supported by the Ernst von Siemens Music Foundation, the Boston Symphony Orchestra supported in part by the Massachusetts Cultural Council's New Works Fund, and the Leipzig Gewandhaus Orchestra. The piece was given its world premiere by Kavakos and the London Symphony Orchestra conducted by Simon Rattle at the Barbican Centre, London, on January 6, 2022.

== Composition ==
The concerto has a duration of approximately 25 minutes and is composed in one continuous movement. Though Unsuk Chin had originally only intended to write one Violin Concerto, she was nevertheless enticed to return to the form after being impressed by the "unique musicianship and artistic personality" of the violinist Leonidas Kavakos. In the score program note, she described the piece as "very different from all the other music I have written for the violin, whether in soloistic function or as part of an ensemble."

=== Instrumentation ===
The work is scored for solo violin and an orchestra comprising three flutes (2nd and 3rd doubling piccolo), two oboes, three clarinets (2nd doubling E-flat clarinet; 3rd doubling bass clarinet), two bassoons, contrabassoon, four horns, three trumpets, four trombones, tuba, timpani, four percussionists, harp, piano (doubling celesta), and strings.

== Reception ==
The violin concerto has been highly praised by classical music critics. Reviewing the world premiere, Andrew Clements of The Guardian wrote, "The solo writing is strenuously demanding – Kavakos seemed totally at ease with every one of its challenges – while the LSO relished all the usual glitter and playful fizz of Chin's sound world. But this time there seems to be an undertow of deep seriousness to the brilliance too, which sometimes takes the music in unexpectedly dark directions." Richard Morrison of The Sunday Times similarly described the piece as "brilliantly conceived," remarking that "it places the soloist at the centre of everything for all of its 25-minute, single-movement span, but surrounds him with a flamboyant array of orchestral ideas that intermittently flare up or flicker away in the background yet never overwhelm the violin. There are snatches of an eerie chorale, playful exchanges between the woodwinds and the front desks of violins, and masses of percussion effects, some shimmering in the background, others exploding through the texture." Richard Bratby of The Spectator also lauded the work, writing, "There's logic here, and even more crucially, there's clarity: Chin's recurring ideas are distinctive enough to trigger recognition. The fast music, too, is actually fast. One gets so used to hearing contemporary composers pedalling breathlessly on the spot that Chin's forward acceleration is at first alarming, and then thrilling."
