= Stephen Burns =

American musician

- Born: Wellesley, Massachusetts, United States
- Genres: Classical
- Occupations: Trumpet player, composer, conductor
- Instrument: Trumpet
- Years active: 1980s–present

Stephen Burns is an American trumpet virtuoso, composer, and conductor. The New York Times said of his playing, "Burns uses his instrument with the lightness and flexibility of a singer in operatic arias. The tone is smooth and buttery, the ornamentation tasteful, the phrasing refined."

== Biography ==
Burns grew up in Wellesley, Massachusetts, and studied at the Juilliard School where he earned a bachelor's degree in 1981 and a master's degree in 1982 in trumpet performance. During that time he also studied at the Tanglewood Music Center during the summers under Armando Ghitalla, Gerard Schwarz, Pierre Thibaud, and Arnold Jacobs. He later pursued further studies in Paris and Chicago.

Burns won the Young Concert Artists International Auditions in 1981, which led to his acclaimed New York City recital debut at the 92nd Street Y on 23 March 1982. In 1982 he was awarded an Avery Fisher Career Grant and in 1983 he received a National Endowment for the Arts Recitalist Grant. He took first Prize at the Maurice André International Competition for Trumpet in France in 1988. He has performed with major orchestras and music ensembles throughout the world including performances with the Atlanta Symphony, the Los Angeles Chamber Orchestra, the Ensemble Orchestral de Paris, the Arturo Toscanini Orchestra, the Leipzig Kammerorkester, the Japan National Philharmonic, and the Seattle Symphony to name just a few. A former faculty member at the Jacobs School of Music of Indiana University, the State University of New York at Purchase and at the Manhattan School of Music, he is currently teaching at the Center for Advanced Musical Studies at Chosen Vale. He is also the Artistic Director of the Fulcrum Point New Music Project and the American Concerto Orchestra in Chicago.

Burns is married, with twin sons who are following in his footsteps musically. He and his family are also the proud owners of a French Bulldog, "Thibaud", named after one of Burns's revered teachers, Pierre Thibaud.
