= Sunwook Kim =

South Korean pianist (born 1988)

Sunwook Kim 김선욱
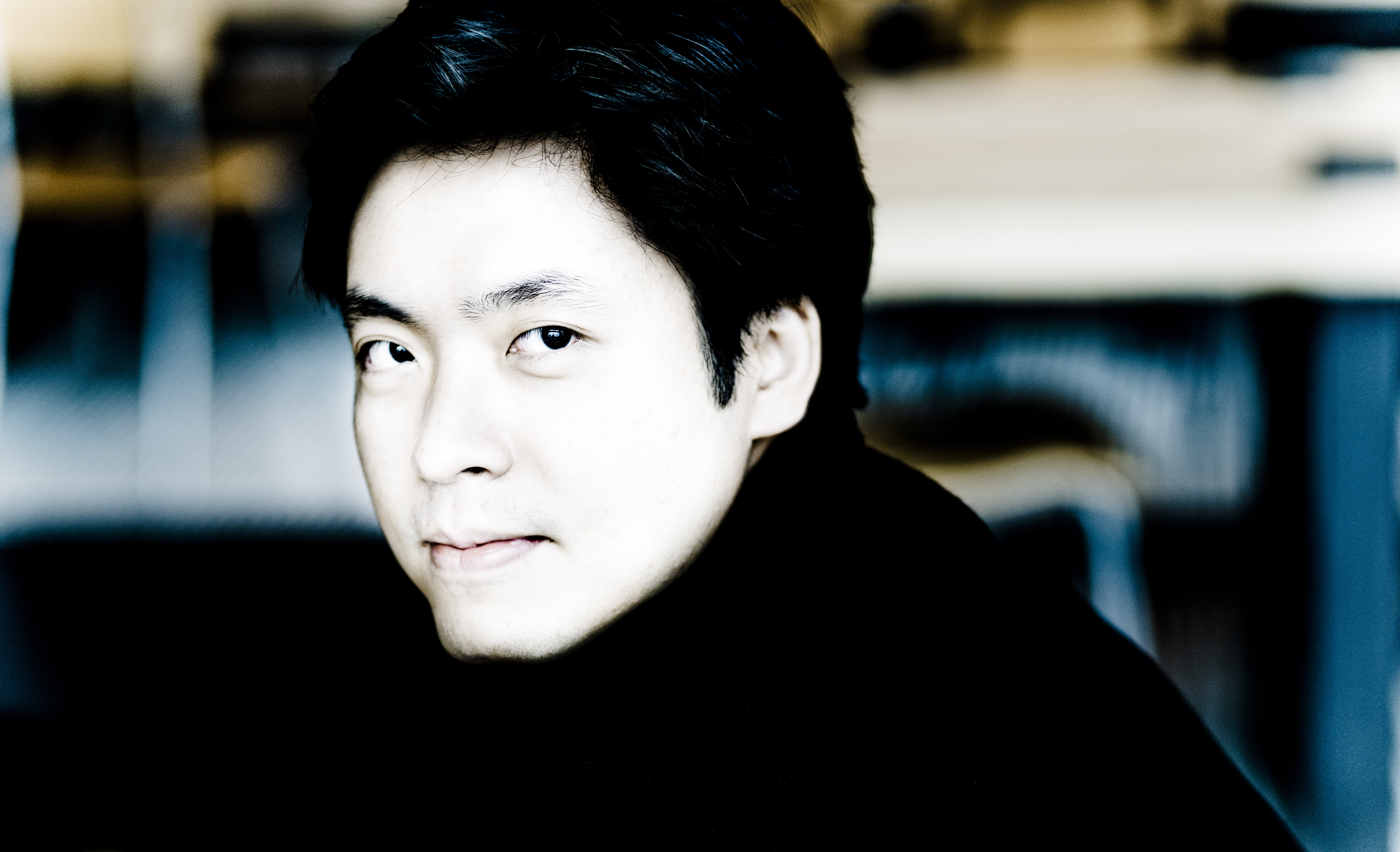
- Kim in 2017

Background information
- Born: April 22, 1988 (age 38); Seoul, South Korea
- Genres: Classical
- Occupation: Musician
- Instrument: Piano
- Labels: Accentus Music; Deutsche Grammophon
- Website: sunwookkim.com

Korean name
- Hangul: 김선욱
- RR: Gim Seonuk
- MR: Kim Sŏnuk

Sunwook Kim (Korean: 김선욱; born April 22, 1988) is a South Korean pianist living in London. He came to international recognition when he won the prestigious Leeds International Piano Competition in 2006.

== Early life ==
Kim was born in Seoul, South Korea on 22 April 1988. He began studying the piano at the age of three. He gave his debut recital aged ten and this was followed by his concerto debut two years later. He won the Leeds International Piano Competition aged just 18, becoming the competition's youngest winner for 40 years, as well as its first Asian winner. Kim's performance of Brahms Piano Concerto in D minor with The Hallé and Sir Mark Elder in the competition's final won unanimous praise from the press, and led to concerto engagements with UK's finest orchestras as well as various recitals around Europe.

At the time of the competition, Kim was a student at the Korea National University of Arts under Daejin Kim. He had also previously won the IX Ettlingen Competition and the XVIII Concours Clara Haskil. He was awarded the Artist of the Year prizes from the Daewon Cultural Foundation (2005) and Kumho Asiana Group (2007).

He has received MA degree for conducting from Royal Academy of Music in 2013.

== Career ==
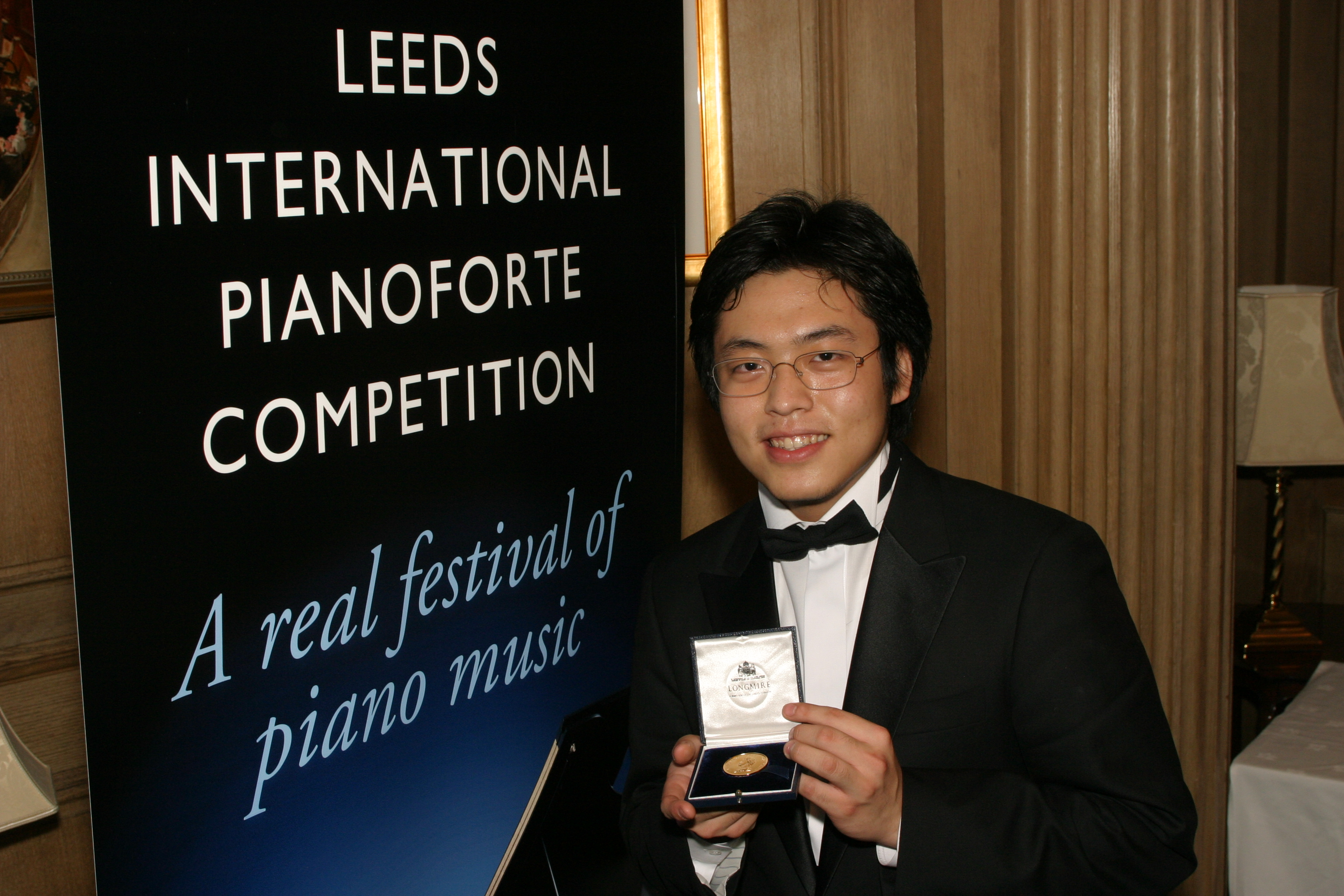
Sunwook Kim having won the 2006 Leeds International Piano Competition.

He has established a reputation as one of the finest pianists of his generation, appearing as a concerto soloist in the subscription series of some of the world's leading orchestras, including the London Symphony Orchestra (John Eliot Gardiner, Daniel Harding), Royal Concertgebouw Orchestra (Myung-Whun Chung), Berlin Radio Symphony Orchestra (Marek Janowski), Tokyo Philharmonic, NDR Symphony Orchestra, Finnish Radio Symphony, (Sakari Oramo, Andrew Manze, Tugan Sokhiev), Deutsche Kammerphilharmonie Bremen (Paavo Järvi), Philharmonia Orchestra (Vladimir Ashkenazy, Juraj Valčuha, Edward Gardner), London Philharmonic (Vassily Sinaisky), Orchestre philharmonique de Radio France (Myung-Whun Chung, Kwamé Ryan), NHK Symphony (Karl-Heinz Steffens), Hamburger Symphoniker (Guy Braunstein), Hallé Orchestra (Mark Elder), the Bournemouth Symphony Orchestra(Kirill Karabits), BBC National Orchestra of Wales, BBC Philharmonic, Royal Scottish National Orchestra, Lausanne Chamber Orchestra and the Aspen Festival Orchestra.

In 2013, Kim made his debut at the BBC Proms with Bournemouth Symphony (Kiril Karabits) performing Beethoven's Piano Concerto No. 3. The same year he was selected by the Beethoven-Haus Bonn to become the first beneficiary of its new Mentoring Programme, a status which grants him exclusive access to the house's unique collections and resources.

He has performed chamber music with musicians including Guy Braunstein, Augustin Hadelich, Jian Wang (cellist), Alisa Weilerstein, Nobuko Imai. Recitals to date include the Wigmore Hall in London, regular appearances in the "Piano 4 Etoiles" series at Salle Pleyel, Kioi Hall in Tokyo, Symphony Hall Osaka, Brussels Klara Festival, Brussels Summer Festival, Beethoven-Haus and Beethovenfest in Bonn, Klavier-Festival Ruhr and Mecklenburg-Vorpommern Festspiele.

== Recordings ==
- 2020 – Brahms: Piano Concerto No.1(Live) (With Myung-whun Chung, Staatskapelle Dresden) & Six Piano Pieces op.118
- 2017 – Beethoven Piano Sonatas – No. 8 in c minor, Op. 13 (Pathetique), No. 14 in c# minor, Op. 27–2 (Moonlight), Piano Sonata – No. 23 in f minor, op. 57 (Appassionata) – Accentus Music
- 2016 – Brahms & Franck – Brahms: Piano Sonata No. 3 in F minor, op. 5, Franck, C: Prélude, Choral et Fugue (Franck) – Accentus Music
- 2015 – Beethoven Piano Sonatas – No. 21 in C major, Op. 53 (Waldstein), No. 29 in B♭ major, Op. 106 (Hammerklavier) – Accentus Music
- 2014 – Unsuk Chin: Piano Concerto (With Myung-whun Chung, Seoul Philharmonic Orchestra) – Deutsche Grammophon
- 2013 – Beethoven Piano Concerto No. 5 in E flat major, Op. 73 'Emperor' (With Myung-whun Chung, Seoul Philharmonic Orchestra) – Deutsche Grammophon

== International Awards ==
- 2004 Ettlingen Competition (Germany) – First prize
- 2005 Clara Haskil International Piano Competition (Switzerland) – First prize
- 2006 Leeds International Piano Competition (UK) – First prize

The CD featuring Unsuk Chin's Piano Concerto won awards from BBC Music Magazine and International Classical Music Awards.

== Reviews ==
- "Kim's deep feelings for Franck are obvious in the breadth and emotional resonance he brings to the Prelude, Chorale and Fugue[...] especially striking is the pristine clarity he invests in the score's often murky textures[...] there can be little doubt that Kim will be back to share with us his evolving love of this fantastically challenging music." Gramophone Magazine, 2016 – Brahms & Franck recording
- "The Waldstein is altogether quite impressive, with its dazzling opening movement thrown off with apparent ease, the slow introduction to the final admirably sustained, and the controversial blurred pedal effects of the concluding rondo itself intelligently handled." – BBC Music Magazine, 2015 – Beethoven Piano Sonatas recording
- "The swell of suspended harmonies was perfectly controlled, the chords perfectly struck and voiced, and Kim always kept the sense of restless searching at just the right level of intensity". George Hall, The Guardian, 2014 – City of London Festival
- "Kim repaid the investment by allowing every voice in this concerto to speak, shirking grand gestures and playing with absorbing concentration and nuance." – Neil Fisher, The Times, 2013 – BBC Proms debut at Royal Albert Hall
- "The finale benefited from his energetic attack and immaculate fingerwork, while some historically informed touches gave individuality to Karabits's astute management of the orchestral accompaniment." – George Hall, The Guardian, 2013 – BBC Proms debut at Royal Albert Hall
- "[Kim] gave a simply astonishing performance. It is rare to hear a performer so aware of the possibilities for intimacy in the Albert Hall's massive acoustic: Kim placed pianissimos always on the edge of disappearance so that the audience almost had to strain to hear; the effect was spellbinding, particularly in the simple but shattering cadenzas of the second movement." Bachtrack., 2013 – BBC Proms debut at Royal Albert Hall
- "Virtuosity was kept firmly in check in the finale, Kim's lightness of touch and finesse never less than compelling." 2010 – performance with Philharmonia Orchestra and Vladimir Ashkenazy
