= Chorós Chordón =

Orchestral work by Unsuk Chin

Chorós Chordón is an orchestral composition written in 2017 (revised in 2020) by the South Korean composer Unsuk Chin. The work was commissioned by the Berlin Philharmonic for the orchestra's tour of the Far East as part of Simon Rattle's final season as their principal conductor. Its world premiere was given by the Berlin Philharmonic conducted by Rattle at the Berliner Philharmonie on 3 November 2017, though the composition was shortly thereafter performed in Hong Kong, Shanghai, Seoul, Kawasaki, and Tokyo.

== Composition ==
Chorós Chordón is cast in a single movement and lasts about 11 minutes. The title of the work translates to Dance of the Strings, which are thus prominently featured in its orchestration.

=== Instrumentation ===
The work is scored for a large orchestra comprising three flutes (2nd doubling alto flute; 3rd doubling piccolo), three oboes (3rd doubling Cor anglais), three clarinets (2nd doubling E-flat clarinet), bassoon, contrabassoon, four horns, four trumpets, three trombones, tuba, timpani, four percussionists, harp, celesta, piano, and strings.

== Reception ==
Chorós Chordón has been generally praised by music critics. Andrew Clements of The Guardian described the piece as "a dense web of melodic tendrils, led by the strings, which vanishes into thin air as abruptly as it begins." Graham Rickson of The Arts Desk similarly wrote, "Beginning with imperceptible flickers and twitches, it grows, blossoms and abruptly returns to silence."

== Recording ==
A recording of Chorós Chordón performed by Berlin Philharmonic conducted by Rattle was released on the album The Asia Tour through the orchestra's record label on 18 May 2018.
