= Charlotte Lee (artist manager) =

Charlotte Lee is the Founder and President of Primo Artists, an international classical music management agency headquartered in New York City, and the Founder of the Performing Arts Managers and Agents Coalition.

== Education ==
Lee grew up in New Jersey and began Suzuki violin at the age of four. In high school, she held leadership positions in several ensembles, serving as concertmaster of the New Jersey Youth Symphony, with which she performed at Carnegie Hall in 1993, and the New Jersey Central Regional Orchestra, as well as assistant concertmaster of the MENC All-Eastern Honors Orchestra and the New Jersey All-State Orchestra. She attended Boston University Tanglewood Institute and Eastern Music Festival before pursuing higher education in Texas, where she earned dual Bachelor of Arts degrees in Music and Plan II Liberal Arts, graduating cum laude from the University of Texas at Austin in May 1998. At UT Austin, she studied with Vincent Frittelli (a pupil of Ivan Galamian), served as assistant concertmaster of the UT Symphony Orchestra, and participated in masterclasses with Dorothy DeLay.

== Early career ==
Lee began her career in the music business in 1998 in New York at PolyGram, later known as Universal Music Group, as an intern for the Deutsche Grammophon, Decca, Philips and Sugar Music labels. Through an introduction to co-founder and former director of IMG Artists Charles Hamlen, she shifted into artist management and joined IMG Artists working on the management teams for artists including Joshua Bell, Hilary Hahn, Lang Lang, Evgeny Kissin and Franz Welser-Möst. She was promoted to become IMG Artists' youngest manager at age 24, taking on her own roster of artists, and by 2007 was named the company's youngest vice president at age 30. As director of orchestral booking, she oversaw the North American bookings of nearly 100 conductors, instrumentalists and symphony pops programs. She eventually became a Senior Vice President, managing several of the agency's established artists, including Itzhak Perlman and Nicola Benedetti.

== Primo Artists ==
In January 2015, after 17 years with IMG Artists, Lee founded the boutique management agency Primo Artists, based in New York. The initial roster included Perlman, Benedetti and Cristian Măcelaru, all of whom she had represented at IMG. WQXR described Primo Artists as an "upstart firm" that attracted industry attention when established artists left major management to join the new agency. As of 2025, the roster includes violinist-conductors Itzhak Perlman and Joshua Bell; violinists Nicola Benedetti and Randall Goosby; pianist Beatrice Rana; composers Wynton Marsalis and Joel Thompson; composer and flutist Valerie Coleman; and conductors Cristian Măcelaru, James Gaffigan, Gemma New and Christian Reif.

In May 2022, the agency expanded with the launch of a PR Division, following its initial move into public relations during the COVID-19 pandemic and the creation of its Social Media Division. The expansion made Primo Artists the only management agency in the arts field to offer artist management, public relations, and social media services under one roof for artists and institutions worldwide. Its PR clients have included Lincoln Center, George Enescu International Festival and Competition, London Philharmonic Orchestra, Detroit Symphony Orchestra, Young Concert Artists and the Sphinx Organization, along with composers, instrumentalists, vocalists, ensembles and other institutions.

In September 2025, Primo Artists announced the opening of a European office in London. Maja Rath, formerly an Artist Manager at HarrisonParrott, joined the agency to lead the expansion. At the same time, Primo Artists announced expanded representation of conductors Gemma New and Christian Reif, moving from general management to exclusive worldwide general management.

== Advocacy ==
In May 2020, during the COVID-19 pandemic and suspension of live performances, Lee founded the Performing Arts Managers and Agents Coalition (PAMAC) to advocate for congressional support of the arts. Representing more than 250 agencies and organizations, PAMAC launched a Change.org petition that collected over 17,000 signatures urging Congress to provide industry relief. On August 4, 2020, the coalition held a conference call with senior staff of Senate Majority Leader Mitch McConnell—the only such meeting granted to a group from the arts and entertainment sector—to press for federal aid. In that meeting, PAMAC championed the inclusion of the "Save Our Stages" provisions, which were incorporated into the Consolidated Appropriations Act, 2021, a major federal relief package during the pandemic.

The legislation allocated $15 billion in grants through what became the Shuttered Venue Operators Grant program, supporting live music venues, cultural institutions, independent movie theaters, and talent agencies, representing the largest public rescue of the arts and entertainment industry in U.S. history. In March 2021, the American Rescue Plan Act added approximately $1.25 billion in supplemental funding.

== Executive producer ==
Lee has served as executive producer on several concert projects featuring Perlman. In May 2019, through Primo Artists, she launched An Evening with Itzhak Perlman, an intimate multi-media program of music and storytelling in which Perlman shares anecdotes from his life and career. The production has toured to numerous cities across North America, including Walt Disney Concert Hall in Los Angeles and Davies Symphony Hall in San Francisco, and continues into the 2025/26 season and beyond.

On September 29, 2025, through her role at Primo Artists, Lee served as co-executive producer of Itzhak Perlman in the Fiddler’s House: A Celebration of His 80th Birthday at New York's Beacon Theatre, marking Perlman's first appearance at the venue, a stage that has hosted artists including Paul Simon, Bob Dylan, and Leonard Cohen. The concert was produced in partnership with City Winery, Metropolitan Entertainment, and Park Avenue Artists.

== Awards ==
In 2015, Musical America named Lee one of its Top 30 Professionals of the Year in the inaugural edition of the award, recognizing her influence in the classical music industry. She received the honor again in 2021. In 2020, Auditorium magazine featured Lee among 14 leading artist management CEOs shaping the global performing arts industry, and in 2022, she received the Western Arts Alliance Service Award in recognition of her advocacy, contributions and leadership on the Shuttered Venues Operators Grant.

== Competitions and events ==
Lee has served as a jury member for music competitions and has spoken on music industry topics at universities, conservatories and industry conferences. She was a juror for the Sphinx Competition in 2017, 2020 and 2025. In 2019, she was jury chair of the Parkening International Guitar Competition and also participated as a panelist in the Dallas Opera's Hart Institute for Women Conductors. She was a panelist at the Dallas Symphony Orchestra’s Women in Classical Music Symposium in 2019 and 2023.
