= Cello Concerto (Unsuk Chin) =

Musical composition by Unsuk Chin

Unsuk Chin's Cello Concerto was written between 2006 and 2008 on a commission from the BBC. It was composed specifically for the cellist Alban Gerhardt, who performed the world premiere with the BBC Scottish Symphony Orchestra conducted by Ilan Volkov at The Proms on 13 August 2009. Unsuk Chin later revised the piece, however, and an updated version of the concerto was performed by Gerhardt and the Bavarian State Orchestra conducted by Kent Nagano at the National Theatre, Munich, on 10 June 2013. The work is dedicated to Alban Gerhardt.

== Composition ==
The cello concerto has a duration of about 30 minutes and is cast in four movements. The first movement is subtitled "Aniri," a term from Korean pansori theater that denotes the narrative passages.

=== Instrumentation ===
The work is scored for solo cello and a large orchestra consisting of three flutes (2nd doubling alto flute and piccolo, 3rd doubling piccolo), three oboes (3rd doubling Cor anglais), three clarinets (3rd doubling E-flat clarinet), three bassoons (3rd doubling contrabassoon), four horns, four trumpets (3rd and 4th doubling E-flat trumpet), four trombones (3rd and 4th bass trombone), tuba, timpani, four percussionists, two harps, piano (doubling celesta), and strings.

== Reception ==
Reviewing the world premiere, Andrew Clements of The Guardian highly praised the concerto, describing it as "strikingly fresh" and "a major addition to the concerto repertory." Reviewing the United States premiere with Gerhardt and the Boston Symphony Orchestra conducted by Susanna Mälkki, Keith Powers of The Classical Review described it as a "superbly tense work [that] stretched sonic boundaries not with atonal inventions but with harmonic and sub-harmonic experimentation. The piece avoided showy virtuosity while placing considerable musical demands on the soloist and the large orchestral forces required."

Following the 2013 revision, Andrew Clements reviewed the work again to glowing praise, describing it as "arguably the most important concerto for that instrument to appear since Lutosławski's in 1970." Arnold Whittall of Gramophone similarly described the concerto as "an outstanding achievement" and "spontaneously eloquent as well as powerfully dramatic." He added, "The orchestral writing is perfectly judged to actively engage with and complement the soloist, and the reflective, questing ending is one of the most memorable in the contemporary concerto repertory." In 2019, The Guardian ranked the Cello Concerto the 12th greatest work of art music since the year 2000.
