= Randall Goosby =

American violinist, born 1996

- Born: July 6, 1996 (age 29)
- Genres: Classical
- Occupation: Musician
- Instrument: Violin
- Years active: 2006–present
- Labels: Decca Records
- Website: randallgoosby.com

Randall Goosby (born July 6, 1996) is an American concert violinist. He is the recipient of the 2022 Avery Fisher Career Grant and was the first prize winner of the Young Concert Artists International Auditions in 2018.

== Biography ==
Born in San Diego, California, in 1996 to a Korean mother and a Black father, Goosby started learning the violin at the age of 7 and made his debut with the Jacksonville Symphony at the age of 9. At the age of 13, Goosby performed with the New York Philharmonic in a Young People's Concert at Lincoln Center's Avery Fisher Hall (now David Geffen Hall). Goosby attended Juilliard's Pre-College program under a full scholarship and has both received a Bachelor of Music under Itzhak Perlman and Catherine Cho and a Master of Music under Donald Weilerstein and Laurie Smukler from the Juilliard School of Music on a Kovner Fellowship. In 2022, Goosby received an artist diploma from Juilliard under Perlman and Catherine Cho.

Goosby has performed with the New York Philharmonic, the Philadelphia Orchestra, the San Francisco Symphony, the Philharmonia Orchestra, the Los Angeles Philharmonic, the Royal Scottish National Orchestra, the Cleveland Orchestra, and the Toronto Symphony Orchestra, among other orchestras.

Goosby has been in multiple nonprofit organizations, including Project: Music Heals Us, Opportunity Music Project, and Concerts in Motion. In 2020, he became a Music Masters Ambassador.

In 2020, Goosby signed with Decca Records. His debut album, Roots, with Zhu Wang, was released in 2021 . In 2022-23, he recorded Chevalier de Saint-Georges's Violin Concerto in G major for the film and soundtrack of Chevalier.

Goosby performed at the BBC Proms for the first time in 2025, performing a concerto by Saint-George alongside the Orchestre National de France.

Goosby performs on the 1708 "ex-Strauss" Stradivarius violin on a loan from the Samsung Foundation of Culture of Korea. Past instruments include a Guadagnini violin loaned from the Juilliard School of Music and a 1735 Guarneri Del Gesu loaned from the Stradivari Society.

He is represented by Charlotte Lee at Primo Artists

== Awards and appearances ==
- Recipient of Kovner Fellowship, Juilliard School
- 2010: First prize winner, Sphinx Concerto Competition
- 2018: First prize winner, Young Concert Artists International Auditions
- 2022: Recipient, Avery Fisher Career Grant
