= Violin Concerto No. 1 (Unsuk Chin) =

Composition by Unsuk Chin

Unsuk Chin's Violin Concerto No. 1 was written in 2001 on a commission from the Deutsches Symphonie-Orchester Berlin, where she was then serving as composer-in-residence. It was given its world premiere by the violinist Viviane Hagner and the Deutsches Symphonie-Orchester Berlin conducted by Kent Nagano at the Berliner Philharmonie on January 20, 2002. The piece was awarded the prestigious Grawemeyer Award for Music Composition in 2004. Unsuk Chin later composed a second Violin Concerto, Scherben der Stille (Shards of Silence), in 2021.

== Composition ==
The concerto has a duration of roughly 27 minutes and is cast in four numbered movements.

=== Instrumentation ===
The work is scored for solo violin and an orchestra comprising two flutes (2nd doubling piccolo), two oboes (2nd doubling Cor anglais), two clarinets (2nd doubling E-flat clarinet), two bassoons, contrabassoon, four horns, four trumpets, two trombones, tuba, timpani, five percussionists, two harps, harpsichord (doubling celesta), and strings.

== Reception ==
The music critic Joshua Kosman of the San Francisco Chronicle highly praised the concerto, writing, "this is a score of enormous beauty, rhetorical force and structural ingenuity; by rights it should become a staple of the concert landscape." He continued, "The piece lasts about 25 minutes and is laid out in the four-movement plan traditional for symphonies, though not concertos – a substantial opening movement, a slow movement, a brisk scherzo and a lively set of variations on a dancelike tune. The writing is richly colorful without ever sounding turgid, and the solo part combines clarity and eloquence with the sort of dizzying pyrotechnics that any concerto requires." Christopher Dingle of BBC Music Magazine similarly wrote, "With musings around the instrument's four strings providing the starting point to the first three of the four movements, there is a clear unity around which more unusual textures can circulate." He added, "It is not as startlingly original as the more recent Cello Concerto, but it is an absorbing and enjoyable work."

== Recording ==
A recording of the concerto, performed by Viviane Hagner and the Montreal Symphony Orchestra conducted by Kent Nagano, was released by Analekta on March 24, 2009.
