= Freddy Kempf =

British pianist in Berlin (born 1977)

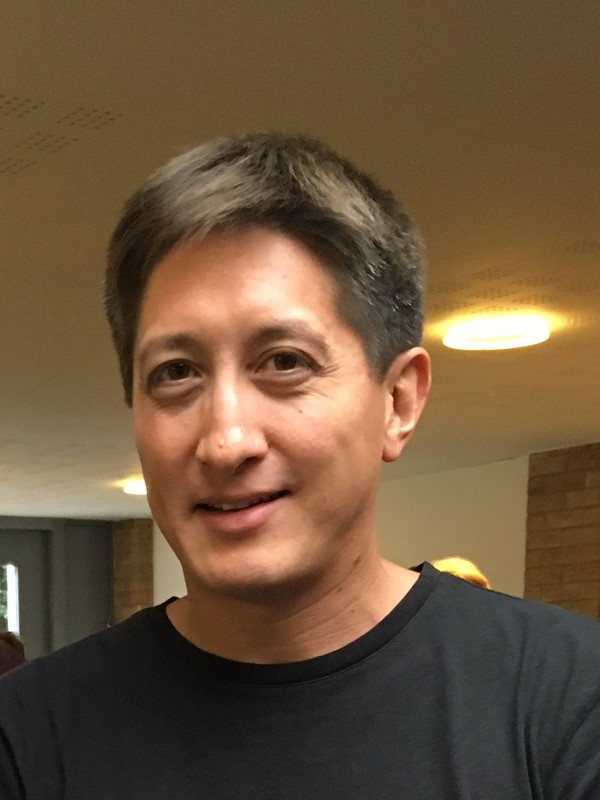
- Freddy Kempf in July 2017

Background information
- Born: Frederick Albert Kempf; 14 October 1977 (age 48); Croydon, London, United Kingdom
- Genres: Classical
- Occupation: Classical pianist
- Instrument: Piano

Frederick Albert Kempf (born 14 October 1977) is a British pianist born in Croydon to a German father and a Japanese mother. He lives in Berlin.

== Early life ==
Kempf was born in Croydon. He was educated at The Junior Kings School and St Edmund's School, Canterbury and the Royal Academy of Music. Taking up the piano at the age of four under Ronald Smith, Kempf first caught the attention of British concertgoers four years later when he played Mozart's Piano Concerto No. 12 with the Royal Philharmonic Orchestra at the Royal Festival Hall. The child virtuoso was shortly invited to Germany to repeat his performance. In 1987, Kempf won the first National Mozart Competition in England and in 1992, was named BBC Young Musician of the Year for his performance of Rachmaninoff's Rhapsody on a Theme of Paganini. He won the Young Concert Artists International Auditions in 1996 which led to his New York City recital debut at Carnegie Hall.

== Later career ==
Kempf's early adult career benefited from his failure to win the 1998 International Tchaikovsky Competition in Moscow, where the first prize in the piano section went instead to Denis Matsuev. Apparently, some judges had wanted to award the first prize jointly to Matsuev and Kempf, and had successfully negotiated with the Russian Culture Ministry for the additional funding. However, Kempf only collected the third prize in the end, which provoked a barrage of indignant protests from both the audience and the Russian press, who accused some of the judges of bias, especially towards contestants who also happened to be their former pupils. In April 1999, Kempf returned to Moscow with a series of television broadcasts and sold-out concerts. His popularity has been compared with that garnered by American pianist Van Cliburn who, in a different result in 1958, had won the inaugural competition.

Kempf has continued to perform solo, chamber and concertante music in Europe, the Americas, East Asia and Australia, and has recorded recital discs of Bach, Beethoven, Chopin, Liszt, Prokofiev, Rachmaninoff and Schumann. He was voted Best Young British Classical Performer in the Classical BRIT Awards in 2001.

In 2000 he formed the Kempf Trio, with Pierre Bensaid (violin) and Alexander Chaushian (cello). The trio has been well received in Europe, as well as in their international concerts. Now London-based, they have appeared at the Flanders Festival in Belgium and in France at the Orpheus & Bacchus Festival. The ensemble made its United States debut in the chamber music series at La Jolla, California, and in Scottsdale, Arizona. In an April 2000 interview with Kempf, MusicWeb-International's Marc Bridle wrote,

"Unlike many musicians of his age, Kempf has a startlingly mature interest in chamber music", quoting Kempf as saying, "With the piano it's very easy for your life to become very solitary. You're always the soloist, or you tell the conductor what to do. And with recitals it's the same, you just do what you want. ... It's nice to sit in a chamber group and be told 'you're playing rubbish', or to be told what to do. ... For me it's one of the most fulfilling mediums to play in. Especially with the piano trio you can be as selfish as you want with each instrument treated as a solo."

Bridle went on to note, "His craving for chamber music came from the Marlboro Festival", and cited Kempf recalling that, "I remember being told I'd have to rehearse the Mozart Piano Trio on the first day. […] All of these people were there and they just wanted to play chamber music. Even if you played with the cellist of the Guarneri Quartet, who had played with Rubinstein and had played the piece more than 200 or 300 times, you always felt comfortable. If you had a valid idea they would listen to you, it was just a wonderful experience". Bridle added, "At no time during our interview does Kempf seem more at ease than when talking about chamber music".
