= Daniel Adni =

Israeli pianist (born 1951)

Daniel Adni (Hebrew: דניאל עדני; born 6 December 1951) is an Israeli classical pianist.

He began his training in Haifa and made his debut at age 12. He studied with Vlado Perlemuter at the Paris Conservatory, winning the Premier Prix 3 times. Afterwards he studied with Géza Anda in Zurich (1970). In 1970 he made his London debut, won the Young Concert Artists International Auditions (1976) and the Phillip M. Faucett Prize (1981). He toured throughout the world and played with leading orchestras and conductors.

In 1999, he and Tessa Katzenellenbogen were married in London, England.
