= Jazz in China =

Jazz was introduced to China in the early 20th century, and new forms of it were developed in the country as the genre was influenced by the local culture. It further influenced the development of C-pop in the late 20th century and 21st century.

== History ==
=== Before 1949 ===
The introduction of jazz to China can be traced back to the 1920s and 1930s, particularly in Shanghai. As an international city and a key port open to Western trade, Shanghai's unique geopolitical and cultural environment fostered the exchange and adaptation of foreign cultural influences, including jazz. Western colonialism played a significant role in bringing jazz to Shanghai, as Shanghai was colonized by many different Western countries, as well as Japan. In addition, the publishing, media and record industry developed in Shanghai also helped cultivate the spread and development of jazz. Traveling journals of foreign jazz musicians such as Whitey Smith (a jazz drummer from San Francisco who landed in Shanghai in 1922) and Buck Clayton in Shanghai provide valuable documentation on foreign musicians' character in shaping the early development of jazz in Shanghai, and the audience's reaction towards these phenomena.

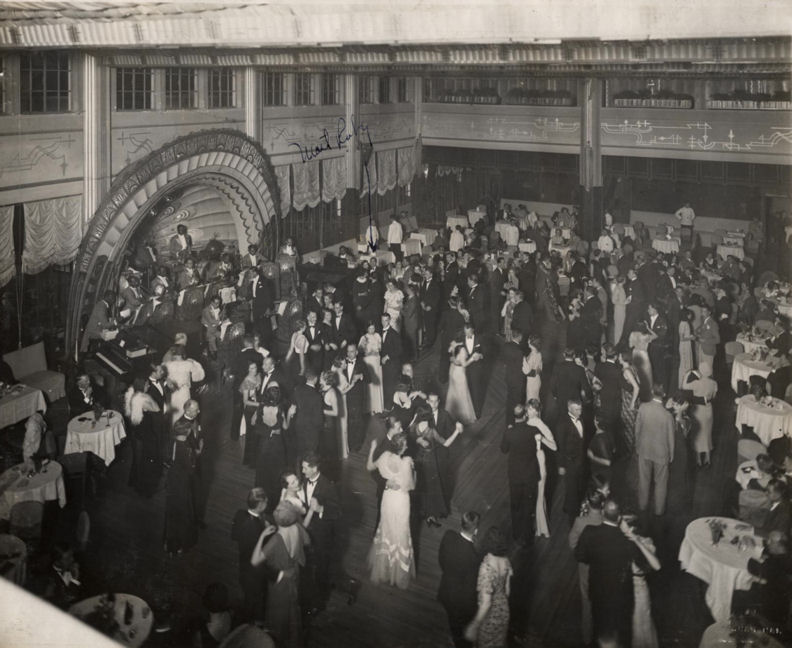
Buck Clayton and his Harlem Gentlemen performing as people dance at the Canidrome Ballroom

Whitney Smith and his band brought elements of Western jazz to Shanghai. He mentions in his book how they creatively adapted their music to appeal to local Chinese audiences. They incorporated popular Western melodies such as "Dardanella," "The Missouri Waltz," and "Stumbling All Around," alongside jazz standards like "The St. Louis Blues," gradually introducing dance rhythms into their performances. Their Chinese adaptations, interwoven with a jazz beat, were well-received, as audiences began to embrace the music and even joined in dancing. Songs like "Singing in the Rain" and "Parade of the Wooden Soldiers" became particularly popular among the younger crowd.

Despite these successes, the band encountered cultural limitations, particularly in blending Western instruments with traditional Chinese music. For example, in Whitney's journal, he mentions their pianist, Jimmy Elder, struggled to adapt jazz piano techniques to Chinese compositions, finding that intricate fingerwork was unnecessary for the simpler musical structures, which frustrated him greatly.Buck Clayton and his band Harlem Gentlemen mainly performed in the Canidrome Ballroom in Shanghai. He highlighted Shanghai's unique cosmopolitan character in his writing. As an international settlement, Shanghai was home to a diverse community, including British, French, Russian, American, and other foreign residents. This diversity reflected Shanghai's status as a global trading hub, where businesses from around the world converged, further enhancing the city's reputation as a melting pot of cultures. However, the band's time in Shanghai was not without conflict. Clayton recounted instances of racial prejudice and personal confrontation, such as an altercation in an upscale club where he was subjected to a racial slur and unexpectedly attacked by a former marine prizefighter. These incidents underscored the persistent challenges of racism and the volatile environment in some expatriate social circles.

Later, jazz experienced deviation from its origin, U.S. jazz. It was adapted and localized by Chinese musicians like Li Jinhui who fused together jazz, American traditional pop, Chinese folk tunes, folk music and instruments, creating a new style dubbed Yellow music. This genre combined jazz's modern rhythms with Chinese cultural elements and was emblematic of Shanghai's cosmopolitan musical landscape. Demonstrations include the famous C-pop genre Shidaiqu and Shanghai Paramount Ballroom. Shidaiqu, in its musical style, reflected the fusion of jazz, Chinese folk music, and American pop. In its content, it aligned with the extravagant and flourishing nightlife of Shanghai. Its popularity demonstrated people's appreciation for this musical style. These songs were primarily performed in major dance halls such as the Paramount Ballroom. Local people and celebrities socialized, entertained, danced and held major events in these ballrooms, further showcasing the widespread appeal of jazz among the public.

=== From 1949 to 1978 ===
After the establishment of the People's Republic of China in 1949, jazz's robust development was constrained by the new Chinese leaders, represented by Mao Zedong. Jazz was considered to be a "greater and bad taste" because of its degree of freedom, which is the core characteristic of jazz music. Moreover, the Chinese government even regarded jazz as non-revolutionary, as well as a product of capitalism that violated Mao's "continuous revolution" ideology. Thus, with the rising influence of the Chinese Communist Party in the country, Chinese pop songs that contained jazz elements were completely proscribed in China, replaced by revolutionary songs that praised and promoted the spirit of patriotism as well as the career of Mao and the CCP, for example, "The East is Red", a northern Shaanxi folk song sung by Li Youyuan and arranged by Li Laxzhi.

The Cultural Revolution (1966–1976), a significant phase of Mao's "continuous revolution," led to stricter cultural controls that severely restricted the performance and dissemination of jazz music in China. During that time, the country underwent significant political and social upheaval aimed at preserving communist ideology and eliminating capitalist influences from Chinese society. Intellectuals perceived as having Western or bourgeois leanings were deprived of the freedom of expression, targeted for persecution, and anything related to the Western culture was aimed to be eliminated. As a result, a second wave of migration occurred following the first one at the end of World War II, during which many prominent Shanghai jazz composers relocated to Hong Kong and Taiwan. This migration contributed to the near stagnation of jazz music development in mainland China

=== After 1978 ===
The end of the Cultural Revolution and the implementation of China's reform and opening up by Deng Xiaoping marked the return of jazz to mainland China. Performances of jazz music resumed in venues such as the jazz bar at the Peace Hotel in Shanghai, reflecting an increasing engagement with Western cultural influences in China. Since then, together with commercialization in China, jazz music quickly regained its popularity, and the development momentum gradually became enormous as people of all ages expressed passion for jazz.

In the 1990s, jazz started to enlarge its influence in other parts of China in addition to Shanghai. More and more people have shown interest in jazz, and jazz bars and jazz festivals started to emerge. Furthermore, jazz enthusiasts began actively creating and sharing their own jazz compositions in addition to accepting jazz as a music genre.

In addition to Shanghai, which was the first city in mainland China to host jazz performances and has experienced significant cultural and economic development, Beijing has also played an important role in the history of jazz music in China. Jazz in Beijing is featured by combining typical jazz elements with various music styles, which is different from the jazz class associations in Shanghai. Liu Yuan, Cui Jian, and many other musicians from Beijing are all among the first to incorporate jazz elements into their music works.

Although jazz has gained popularity in China, it is often less emphasized than classical music and other genres in formal music studies. Additionally, government regulations, influenced in part by traditional Confucian values, have presented challenges to the further development of jazz in the country. Despite these constraints, jazz has established a significant presence and has been integrated into many popular Chinese music compositions.

== Modern legacy ==
Jazz has had an intriguing and evolving legacy in China, emerging as a unique cultural interplay between its Western origins and local Chinese influences. Its modern integration, as exemplified by artists like Jay Chou, reflects an ongoing dialogue between tradition and modernity, global trends and local sensibilities. Jazz's role in China today can be categorized into three key facets: its fusion with Chinese music, its establishment as a niche cultural phenomenon, and its growing significance in education. Together, these aspects reveal jazz's remarkable adaptability and its growing importance in the cultural fabric of modern China.

=== Jazz as a niche culture ===
While jazz is not a mainstream genre in China, it has developed a loyal and vibrant following, particularly in urban centers like Shanghai, Beijing, and Guangzhou. These cities host thriving jazz scenes characterized by iconic venues and events that cater to enthusiasts and musicians alike.

==== In Shanghai ====
Known as the birthplace of jazz in China during the 1920s and 1930s, Shanghai remains a hub for the genre. The JZ Club, established in 2004, is a cornerstone of this community, hosting live performances by local and international artists. The annual JZ Festival further cements Shanghai's reputation as a global jazz city, attracting thousands of attendees and fostering cross-cultural musical exchange.

Witnessing the enduring popularity of jazz music and a growing appetite for high-quality jazz performances in Shanghai, Shanghai Bund Investment Group (BIG) and Jazz at Lincoln Center established their joint expansion, Jazz at Lincoln Center Shanghai, in 2017. The Central, located on East Nanjing Road, one block from the Bund coastline, has been offering high-end boutiques and performing art venues until today.

==== In Beijing ====
In Beijing, venues like Blue Note Beijing, a branch of the world-famous New York club, and East Shore Live Jazz Café provide platforms for both established and emerging talents. These spaces emphasize traditional jazz while incorporating local artistic expressions, creating a uniquely Chinese jazz identity.

Beijing Jazz Festival: In 1993, Udo Hoffman, a German living in Beijing at that time, came up with the idea of an event dedicated to jazz music in China, and one year later he organized the very first Beijing Jazz Festival, which was held annually until 1999 with sponsorship. Each year, the jazz festival featured bands from China, Denmark, the Netherlands, etc., introducing Chinese audiences to international jazz pioneers and providing a platform for Chinese jazz musicians to showcase their brainchildren.

The niche nature of jazz allows it to serve as a marker of urban sophistication and intellectual refinement. This image makes it particularly appealing to the younger, educated middle class, who view jazz as a symbol of cosmopolitanism and creative exploration.

=== Jazz in education ===
Jazz's growing influence in China extends to its presence in education. Institutions like the Shanghai Conservatory of Music and the Central Conservatory of Music in Beijing now offer specialized jazz programs focusing on performance, theory, and composition。

China Conservatory of Music (Beijing): Traditionally known for its focus on Chinese classical music, the China Conservatory has expanded its offerings to include jazz, reflecting the genre's growing relevance.

Jazz education in China not only cultivates technical skills but also emphasizes self-expression and cultural exchange. Aspiring jazz musicians often perform at local clubs, bridging the gap between academic study and the professional music scene.

=== Jazz's broader legacy in modern China ===
Jazz in modern China intertwines cosmopolitan sophistication with localized creativity. As scholar Terence Hsieh observes, the genre reflects urban modernity and regional influences, particularly in cities like Shanghai and Beijing, where cultural and economic contexts shape its aesthetics. Shanghai's cosmopolitan history positions it as a global jazz hub, while Beijing's intellectual atmosphere emphasizes localized artistic expression.

Moreover, jazz, as Hsieh notes, exemplifies the adaptability of global art forms within contemporary Chinese culture. Its integration reflects a broader trend of cultural exchange, where foreign elements are reinterpreted to resonate with local traditions and contemporary heritage, making it a unique vehicle for bridging global and Chinese identities.

== Cultural influence ==
=== Jazz as a symbol of modernity ===
Jazz became a defining element of modernity in Republican-era China (1919–1949), especially in Shanghai. To be considered modern meant listening and dancing to American jazz music, jazz provided the soundtrack for Chinese modernity and helped fuel the cultural industry of jazz age Shanghai.

=== Creation of new social places ===
Jazz facilitated the emergence of alternative social spaces where multiracial and nontraditional interactions occurred. These spaces allowed for improvisation and collaboration among musicians from different backgrounds.

=== Influence on Chinese music ===
Li Jinhui, often called the father of Chinese modern music, was likely influenced by jazz performances in Shanghai. Jazz helped engender new styles and musical esthetic formations such as Cantonese and Mandopop that have a direct link to its progenitor, Li Jinhui and Black music. Famous singers like Zhou Xuan recorded songs that blended jazz and blues formats with Chinese styles

Post-1980s, jazz-influenced educational institutions and the training of musicians in Beijing helped to create a new generation of artists who merged jazz elements with Chinese musical traditions.

=== Impact on the entertainment industry ===
Numerous jazz venues opened across Shanghai, outpacing even Harlem in spatial distribution. Jazz performances were heavily advertised in Chinese newspapers. By the 1930s, cabarets and dance halls employing thousands of workers became a key component of Shanghai's famed nightlife

The revival of jazz clubs like Blue Note Beijing in the 2010s highlights how jazz remains a symbol of cultural sophistication and cross-cultural dialogue in modern China.

=== Challenges to traditional values ===
The popularity of jazz in China led to reactions from both the Nationalist and Communist parties, jazz was seen as a challenge to traditional Chinese values. It became a target of criticism from Chinese intellectuals who viewed it as primitive or decadent.

The rise of female performers in jazz challenged traditional gender norms in China. Historically, women were restricted from performing publicly due to societal taboos equating public singing with moral impropriety. Jazz singers like Zhou Xuan symbolized new visibility for modern women in Chinese society.

=== Cultural exchange ===
African American jazz musicians in Shanghai fostered cultural exchange, they shared their knowledge and skills with other musicians, including Chinese and Japanese players. This exchange helped create a global jazz community and spread the music across Asia.
