= Benny Kim =

American violinist of Korean ancestry (born 1962)

Benny Kim (born 14 August 1962, Urbana, Illinois, USA) is an American violinist of Korean ancestry. One of three sons of Hei Chu Kim and Hyung Ja Kim, his brother Eric Kim is a cellist.

Kim's early teachers included Doris Preucil and Almita Vamos. He studied at the Juilliard School under Dorothy DeLay, and graduated in 1986 with bachelor's and master's degrees. In 1981, he was a prize-winner in the Saint Louis Symphony Young Artist Competition. In 1983, he won the Young Concert Artists competition. In 1984 & 2004, he was a soloist with the Naumburg Orchestral Concerts, in the Naumburg Bandshell, Central Park, in the summer series.

Kim has a specific focus on chamber music performances and is a regular featured musician at chamber music festivals such as the Santa Fe Chamber Music Festival, Music from Angel Fire, La Jolla SummerFest, Chamber Music Northwest, and the Laurel Festival. He has also been active as a concerto soloist.

In 1995, Kim joined the violin faculty at the University of Missouri–Kansas City, and currently has the title of associate professor.
