= Young Concert Artists =

American artist management company

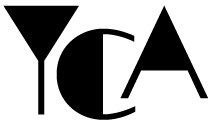
- Type: Non-profit
- Industry: Artist management
- Founded: 1961
- Founder: Susan Wadsworth
- Headquarters: New York City, New York, United States
- Key people: Daniel Kellogg (President)
- Revenue: 4,233,489 United States dollar (2017)
- Total assets: 9,565,011 United States dollar (2022)
- Website: yca.org

Young Concert Artists is a New York City-based artist management company dedicated to discovering and advancing the careers of talented young classical musicians from around the world. The organization, founded in 1961, invites artists to audition and compete as soloists or in an ensemble. The number of winners varies from year to year, as there is no specified limit to the number of participants who can win.

Winners of the audition sign with the organization for management and are presented in recitals at Carnegie Hall in New York City and the Kennedy Center in Washington D.C. during their first season. They are also provided with managers who secure concerts both in the United States and abroad, and assist with career development, promotion, and publicity materials. Many artists in the program’s history have also made their debut albums through the support of the organization.

Notable alumni who began their careers at Young Concert Artists include violinists Pinchas Zukerman, Ray Chen, Anne Akiko Meyers, Viviane Hagner, Karen Gomyo, Jean-Jacques Kantorow, Mayuko Kamio, Ida Kavafian and Randall Goosby; pianists Murray Perahia, Emanuel Ax, Jean-Yves Thibaudet, Richard Goode, Jean-Efflam Bavouzet, Fazıl Say, Lise de la Salle, Freddy Kempf, Olli Mustonen, Jeremy Denk, Aristo Sham, and George Li; cellists Alban Gerhardt, Narek Hakhnazaryan and Edgar Moreau; violists Nobuko Imai and Antoine Tamestit; the Tokyo, St. Lawrence, and Modigliani string quartets; singers Dawn Upshaw, Julia Bullock, and Sasha Cooke; and composers Andrew Norman, Mason Bates and Kevin Puts.

== List of winners ==
Young Concert Artists refers to its winners as alumni:

=== 1960s ===
1961

- Sanford Allen, violinist
- Shmuel Ashkenasi, violinist
- Ruth Glasser, cellist
- Richard Goode, pianist
- Jesse Levine, violist
- Maria Lopez-Vito, pianist
- Barbara Mallow, cellist
- Paula Robison, flutist
- Joel Shapiro, pianist
- Ilana Vered, pianist

1962

- Kenneth Goldsmith, violinist
- Ruth Laredo, pianist
- Robert Martin, cellist
- Margaret Schecter, flutist
- Lawrence L. Smith, pianist
- Inger Wikström, pianist

1963

- Chandler Goetting, trumpeter
- Luis García Renart, cellist
- Yoko Matsuda, violinist
- Satoka Takemae, pianist

1964

- Edward Auer, pianist
- Mauricio Fuks, violinist
- Jung-Ja Kim, pianist
- Mary Beth Peil, soprano
- Toby Saks, cellist

1965

- Paul Green, clarinetist
- Ko Iwasaki, cellist
- Max Neuhaus, percussionist
- Michael Oelbaum, pianist
- Murray Perahia, pianist
- Lorraine Prieur, pianist
- Paul Zukofsky, violinist

1966

- Nerine Barrett, pianist
- Christiane Edinger, violinist
- Donald Weilerstein, violinist
- Pinchas Zukerman, violinist

1967

- Joan Benner, soprano
- Nobuko Imai, violist
- Joseph Kalichstein, pianist
- Arthur Thompson, baritone
- Marcus Thompson, violist
- Hiroko Yajima, violinist

1968

- Jean-Jacques Kantorow, violinist
- Joyce Mathis, soprano
- Anthony Newman, harpsichordist
- Ursula Oppens, pianist
- Fred Sherry, cellist
- Michael Webster, clarinetist

1969

- Gita Karasik, pianist
- Jeffrey Solow, cellist

=== 1970s ===
1970

- Mari-Elizabeth Morgen, pianist
- Eugenia Zukerman, flutist
- Tokyo String Quartet

1971

- Joy Blackett, mezzo-soprano
- Christoph Henkel, cellist
- Rolf Schulte, violinist
- Virgil Blackwell, clarinetist
- Eugene Drucker, violinist
- Paul Dunkel, flutist
- Richard Fitz, percussionist
- John Graham, violist
- Karen Lindquist, harpist
- Joel Marangella, oboist
- Donald Palma, double bass
- Gerard Schwarz, trumpeter
- Fred Sherry, cellist

1972

- Mona Golabek, pianist
- Francoise Regnat, pianist
- Peter Rejto, cellist

1973

- Emanuel Ax, pianist
- Ani Kavafian, violinist
- Diane Walsh, pianist

1974

- Heiichiro Ohyama, violist
- Robert Routch, French horn
- Jeffrey Swann, pianist
- Ronald Thomas, cellist

1975

- (none)

1976

- Daniel Adni, pianist
- Boris Bloch, pianist
- Stephanie Brown, pianist
- Sung-Ju Lee, violinist
- Daniel Phillips, violinist
- Chilingirian String Quartet

1977

- Steven De Groote, pianist

1978

- Colin Carr, cellist
- Lynn Chang, violinist
- Robert Cohen, cellist
- Ida Kavafian, violinist

1979

- Franck Avril, oboist
- Sergei Edelmann, pianist
- Zehava Gal, mezzo-soprano
- Beverly Hoch, soprano
- Marya Martin, flutist

=== 1980s ===
1980

- Toby Appel, violist
- Chantal Juillet, violinist

1981

- Stephen Burns, trumpeter
- Marvis Martin, soprano
- Christopher O'Riley, pianist
- Jean-Yves Thibaudet, pianist
- Endellion Quartet
- Mendelssohn String Quartet

1982

- Carter Brey, cellist
- William Sharp, baritone
- Dominique Weber, pianist

1983

- Jaime Bolipata, pianist
- Ben Holt, baritone
- Benny Kim, violinist
- Anne-Marie McDermott, pianist
- Jeremy Menuhin, pianist
- Christopher Trakas, baritone

1984

- Douglas Boyd, oboist
- Daniel McKelway, clarinetist
- Paul Meyer, clarinetist
- Dawn Upshaw, soprano

1985

- Erik Berchot, pianist
- Marc Laforet, pianist
- Gary Schocker, flutist

1986

- Jean-Efflam Bavouzet, pianist
- Christopher Costanza, cellist
- Anthony De Mare, pianist
- Yuval Fichman, pianist
- Anne Akiko Meyers, violinist
- Marcy Rosen, cellist
- Eric Ruske, French horn
- Paul Shaw, pianist
- Ory Shihor, pianist
- Maurice Sklar, violinist

1987

- Hung-Kuan Chen, pianist
- Rina Dokshitsky, pianist
- Olli Mustonen, pianist

1988

- David Fedele, flutist
- Eduardus Halim, pianist
- Carl Halvorson, tenor
- Hexagon Ensemble, piano and winds
- Ulrike Anima Mathe, violinist
- Asako Urushihara, violinist

1989

- Dmitri Berlinsky, violinist
- Olivier Charlier, violinist
- Chee-Yun, violinist
- Juliette Kang, violinist
- Scott St. John, violinist & violist
- Scott Yoo, violinist

=== 1990s ===
1990

- Dawn Kotoski, soprano
- Todd Palmer, clarinetist
- Alex Slobodyanik, pianist

1991

- Borromeo String Quartet
- Emma Johnson, clarinetist
- Graham Scott, pianist
- Mikhail Yanovitsky, pianist

1992

- Christopheren Nomura, baritone
- Kyoko Saito, soprano
- St. Lawrence Quartet

1993

- Camellia Johnson, soprano

1994

- Dan Coleman, composer-in-residence
- Alban Gerhardt, cellist
- Jan-Erik Gustafsson, cellist
- Makoto Nakura, marimbist
- Nokuthula Ngwenyama, violist

1995

- Diana Doherty, oboist
- Fazıl Say, pianist

1996

- Romain Guyot, clarinetist
- Freddy Kempf, pianist
- Adam Neiman, pianist
- Joo-Young Oh, violinist
- Kevin Puts, composer-in-residence
- Yayoi Toda, violinist
- Gregory Turay, tenor

1997

- Anton Barachovsky, violinist
- Alexander Chaushian, cellist
- Wendy Chen, pianist
- Jeremy Denk, pianist
- Karen Gomyo, violinist
- Stefan Milenkovich, violinist
- Shunsuke Sato, violinist

1998

- Kenji Bunch, composer-in-residence
- Stephan Loges, baritone
- Alexander Mikhailuk, pianist
- Naoko Shimizu, violist
- Vassilis Varvaresos, pianist

1999

- Tim Fain, violinist
- Martin Kasik, pianist
- Rafal Kwiatkowski, cellist
- Randall Scarlata, baritone
- Mimi Stillman, flutist
- Elina Vähälä, violinist
- Gwyneth Wentink, harpist

=== 2000s ===
2000

- Ju-Young Baek, violinist
- Mason Bates, composer
- Catrin Finch, harpist
- Viviane Hagner, violinist
- Paavali Jumppanen, pianist
- Mayuko Kamio, violinist

2001

- Alexandre Bouzlov, cellist
- Marius Brenciu, tenor
- Courtenay Budd, soprano
- Thomas Carroll, cellist
- Yunjie Chen, pianist
- Claremont Piano Trio
- Alezander Fiterstein, clarinetist

2002

- Robert Belinic, guitarist
- Anton Belov, baritone
- Daniel Kellogg, composer
- Nicolas Kendall, violinist
- Vassily Primakov, pianist
- Naoko Takada, marimbist

2003

- Laura Buruiana, cellist
- David Guerrier, trumpeter
- Antoine Tamestit, violist
- Daxun Zhang, double bassist

2004

- Lise de la Salle, pianist
- Jose Franch-Ballester, clarinetist
- Alexandre Pirojenko, pianist

2005

- Efe Baltacigil, cellist
- Benjamin C. S. Boyle, composer
- Philippe Castagner, tenor
- Jennifer Check, soprano
- Gleb Ivanov, pianist
- Jupiter String Quartet
- Dora Seres, flutist
- Wonny Song, pianist

2006

- Emmanuel Ceysson, harpist
- Chu-Fang Huang, pianist
- Amedeo Modigliani Quartet
- Jean-Frédéric Neuburger, pianist

2007

- Sasha Cooke, mezzo-soprano
- Benjamin Moser, pianist
- Andrew Norman, composer
- Louis Schwizgebel, pianist

2008

- Pius Cheung, marimbist
- Narek Hakhnazaryan, cellist

2008/2009

- Ray Chen, violinist
- Ran Dank, pianist
- Jeanine De Bique, soprano
- Hanbin Yoo (Amadéus Leopold), violinist
- Bella Hristova, violinist
- Noé Inui, violinist
- Carolina Ullrich, soprano

2009

- Charlie Albright, pianist
- Caroline Goulding, violinist
- Aleksandr Haskin, flutist
- Jennifer Johnson Cano, mezzo-soprano

=== 2010s ===
2010

- Narek Arutyunian, clarinetist
- Benjamin Beilman, violinist
- George Li, pianist
- Chris Rogerson, composer

2011

- Veit Hertenstein, violist
- Paul Huang, violinist
- Andrew Tyson, pianist

2012

- Julia Bullock, soprano
- Hermès Quartet
- David Hertzberg, composer
- Ji-Yong Kim, pianist
- Cicely Parnas, cellist
- Aleksey Semenenko, violinist

2013

- Raphaël Sévère, clarinetist
- Stephen Waarts, violinist
- Yun-Chin Zhou, pianist

2014

- Daniel Lebhardt, pianist
- Sang-Eun Lee, cellist
- Soo-Been Lee, violinist
- Edgar Moreau, cellist
- Ziyu Shen, violist
- Seiya Ueno, flutist

2015

- Rémi Geniet, pianist
- Tomer Gewirtzman, pianist
- Samuel Hasselhorn, baritone
- Dasol Kim, pianist
- Tonia Ko, composer
- Olivier Stankiewicz, oboist
- Zorá String Quartet

2016

- Benjamin Baker, violinist
- Xavier Foley, double bassist
- Nathan Lee, pianist
- Anthony Trionfo, flutist

2017

- Katherine Balch, composer
- Zlatomir Fung, cellist
- Do-Hyun Kim, pianist
- Omer Quartet
- Hanzhi Wang, accordionist

2018

- Randall Goosby, violinist
- Risa Hokamura, violinist
- Maxim Lando, pianist
- Aristo Sham, pianist
- Jonathan Swensen, cellist

2019

- Steven Banks, saxophonist
- Martin James Bartlett, pianist
- Albert Cano Smit, pianist
- Saad Haddad, composer
- Quartet Amabile

=== 2020s ===
2020

- Megan Moore, mezzo-soprano
- Zhu Wang, pianist
- William Socolof, bass-baritone

2021

- Ying Li, pianist
- Lun Li, violinist
- Daniel McGrew, tenor
- Nina Shekhar, composer
- Harmony Zhu, pianist

2022

- Chelsea Guo, pianist and soprano
- Chaeyoung Park, pianist
- Joseph Parrish, bass-baritone
- Erin Wagner, mezzo-soprano

2023

- James Baik, cellist
- Oliver Neubauer, violinist
- Benett Tsai, cellist
- Michael Yeung, percussionist
- Ziggy & Miles, guitar duo

2024

- Radu Ratoi, accordionist
- Kiron Atom Tellian, pianist
