= Frontispiece (Unsuk Chin) =

Orchestral work by Unsuk Chin

Frontispiece is an orchestral composition written in 2019 by the South Korean composer Unsuk Chin. The work was commissioned by the NDR Elbphilharmonie Orchestra to open Alan Gilbert's inaugural season as their principal conductor. Its world premiere was given by the NDR Elbphilharmonie Orchestra conducted by Gilbert at the Elbphilharmonie, Hamburg, on 6 September 2019.

== Composition ==
=== Background ===
Frontispiece is cast in a single movement and has a duration of roughly 8 minutes. In the score program note, Unsuk Chin described the piece as presenting "a time lapse of a kind of the history of music: certain aspects of a number of key symphonic works of different epochs are being evoked and poured into new moulds by letting them interact and comment upon each other." She added, "As to give but a few examples: certain chord sequences by Anton Bruckner are interpreted in a manner akin to Anton von Webern, splinters of Strauss, Scriabin and Stravinsky collide, Brahmsian harmony passes through the prisms of, say, Charles Ives, and certain material from Tchaikovsky's Sixth Symphony – Heaven forbid – is being presented a la manière de Pierre Boulez." The piece thus references music ranging from the Baroque era through avant-garde music. The composer concluded, "Frontispiece reflects on my decades-long experiences with landmark works of the symphonic literature as composer and recipient. In extracting distinct aspects of works of certain composers, Anton von Webern's art of revealing a 'universe in a nutshell' by means of extreme compression served as a particular inspiration."

=== Instrumentation ===
The work is scored for a large orchestra comprising three flutes (2nd doubling alto flute; 3rd doubling piccolo), three oboes (3rd doubling Cor anglais), three clarinets, two bassoons, contrabassoon, six horns, four trumpets, four trombones, tuba, timpani, three percussionists, piano, and strings.

== Reception ==
Frontispiece has been praised by music critics. Rob Hubbard of the Star Tribune observed, "Chin's Frontispiece is a sweeping collage of fascinating fragments, an eight-minute journey in which ideas clash and collide, most memorably when an uneasy placidity is interrupted by anxious interjections." Scott Cantrell of The Dallas Morning News similarly called it "an eight-minute sonic kaleidoscope" and wrote, "Colors, textures, motifs and gestures emerge, combine and vanish in rapid and dizzying swirls and crunches." Richard Sylvester Oliver of the Texas Classical Review described the piece as "a variegated work combining fragments of various composers and their distinctive styles in a clever reinterpretation that conveys music's evolution through history. In it, colors smash into each other and then blend together beautifully."
