= Viviane Hagner =

German violinist (born 1977)

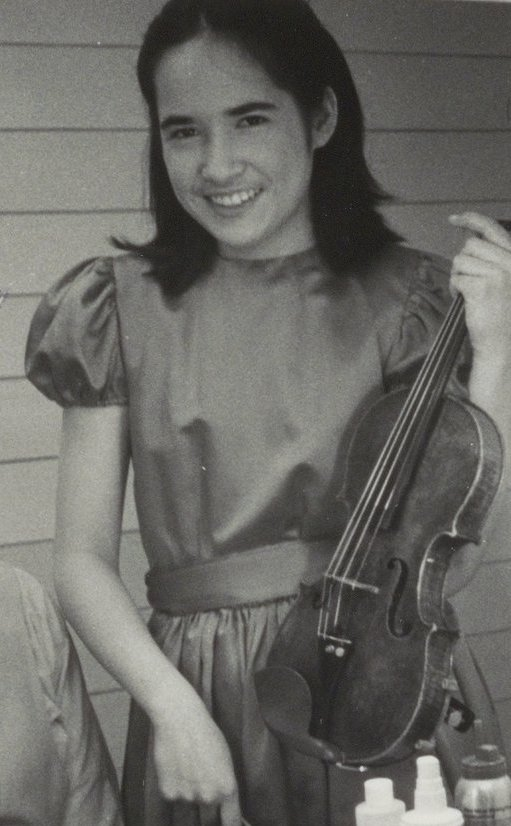
- Viviane Hagner in 1991
- Born: 1977 (age 48–49); Munich, Germany
- Occupation: violinist
- Awards: Young Concert Artists International Auditions in 2000; Borletti Buitoni Trust Award in 2004

Viviane Hagner is a German violinist. She was born in Munich, Germany in 1977 (but grew up in Berlin), to a German father and Korean mother. She is sister to Nicole Hagner, the pianist.

Hagner started studying the piano at age 3 before switching to violin. She made her international concert debut at the age of 12, and one year later performed as soloist at the historic "Joint Concert" in Tel Aviv with the Berlin and Israel Philharmonic Orchestras, under the baton of Zubin Mehta. Since her debut, Hagner has been a regular soloist with leading orchestras including the Berlin Philharmonic, Staatskapelle Berlin, Chicago Symphony, New York Philharmonic, Montreal Symphony, and BBC Symphony, working with top conductors including Daniel Barenboim, Kent Nagano, Claudio Abbado, Zubin Mehta, Vladimir Ashkenazy, and Pinchas Zukerman.

She is also a regular performer of chamber music, and has appeared at festivals including Ravinia, Marlboro, Schleswig-Holstein, and Salzburg, partnering with other musicians including Yo-Yo Ma, Pinchas Zukerman, Yuri Bashmet, Julia Fischer, and her sister, Nicole.

Hagner has performed the world premieres of two violin concertos: Unsuk Chin's violin concerto, in 2002 with the Deutsches Sinfonie-Orchester and Kent Nagano, and Simon Holt's violin concerto, in 2006 with the BBC Symphony Orchestra and Jonathan Nott.

She plays the Sasserno Stradivarius, made in 1717. The instrument is on loan from the Nippon Music Foundation.

Hagner's recordings include chamber works by Beethoven, Schubert, and Saint-Saëns (EMI Classics), the violin concerti by Tchaikovsky and Mendelssohn, while her 2006 album, Ciaconna (Altara), includes Bach's Partita No. 2, Bartók's Sonata for Solo Violin, and Hartmann's Suite for Solo Violin. In May 2010 her recording of Vieuxtemps' 4th and 5th violin concerti, as well as his Fantasia Appassionata, was released by Hyperion, and features Martyn Brabbins and the Royal Flemish Philharmonic. She has recorded the first Violin Concerto by Unsuk Chin with the Montreal Symphony Orchestra under the baton of Kent Nagano directing (Analekta).

She won the Young Concert Artists International Auditions in 2000 and a Borletti Buitoni Trust Award in 2004.

Hagner is also a friend and supporter of the Freya von Moltke Foundation, playing in some successful benefit concerts and events.
