= Kang Sukhi =

South Korean composer (1934–2020)

- 강석희
- Born: October 22, 1934; Seoul, South Korea
- Died: August 16, 2020; Seoul, South Korea
- Education: Seoul National University, Berlin University of the Arts, Technische Universität Berlin
- Occupation: Composer
- Board member of: International Society for Contemporary Music (ISCM)
- Awards: National President Medal of South Korea
- Musical career
- Genres: Classical, contemporary
- Labels: Poly Music Co., Poly Classics

Korean name
- Hangul: 강석희
- Hanja: 姜碩煕
- RR: Gang Seokhui
- MR: Kang Sŏkhŭi

Kang Sukhi (Korean: 강석희; October 22, 1934 – August 16, 2020) was a South Korean composer.

== Careers ==
Kang graduated Seoul National University 1960 majored in Composition, studied in Germany 1970's, He was a student of Yisang Yoon who was South Korean composer thought in Berlin University of the Arts and Kang studied in Yoon's hospital when he visited South Korean for the political allegations. Kang returned to Korea in 12 years from Germany and taught composition at Seoul National University.

He was the first composer who introduced electronic music in South Korea 1969, the 1st vice president as an Asian in the ISCM.

From 1970 to the 1980s, Kang developed his creative activities mainly in Germany, and during this period, Edition Modern (now Ricordi) published works such as Buru for indoor ensembles. As he stated, "The most important thing for music is structure." mainly had activities in Germany between 1970 and 1980. The emphasis is on systematic material manipulation. This methodology did not change with the composition of electronic music. He returned to Korea in 1982. He moved to Edition Gravis in the 1980s. He has sporadically contracted with other publishers. Kang also adopted Korean traditional music element to his music composition, Korean kayageum virtuoso Terra Han was also his student.

After the Seoul Olympics, he released large-scale works such as Concert for Piano and Orchestra (1996–97, Max Eschig), Cello Concert "Berlin" (2002, Edition Gravis), Concerto for Orchestra " Chain Reaction" (2004, Edition Gravis) and Concerto for Orchestra (2010, Edition Gravis). In recent years, he has been enthusiastic about promoting electone music, and his Japanese premiere of the opera "Transcendence" (1993–94) was performed in the electone ensemble version. Transferred to Max Eschig in the 1990s.

He taught at Seoul National University from 1982 to 2000 and produced many disciples. His most famous disciple was Unsuk Chin, and his last disciple was Lee Sangwon. Since 2006, he has been holding regular special classes at Shobi University, in Japan where his student Tetsuyama Omura used to work and Kenichiro Ito's mother school. In 2004, a series of concerts celebrating his 70th birthday was held around the world. Even after he was 70 years old, he was still active in his creative activities and was the most admired heavy weight in the Korean composer world as a whole In 2007, the third musical drama "From Earth to Venus" was premiered in Seoul. In the 2000s he returned to Edition Gravis to publish new works.

In recent years, he had been enthusiastic about the search for microtonal intervals using overtone relations, and has shown a high interest in consonant sound that does not depend on equal temperament harmony. The structuralist approach that was one mentioned was rather more mature in it. Although his work is still published by Ricordi, Durand-Salabert-Eschig, and Edition Gravis, the sale of CD collections and streaming of sound sources by others is rare, and their legitimate evaluation has been delayed.

He died on August 16, 2020, in Seoul.

== Publications ==
- Analysis on Modern Music (Seoul National University Press)
