= Kim Chee-yun =

South Korean violinist (born 1970)

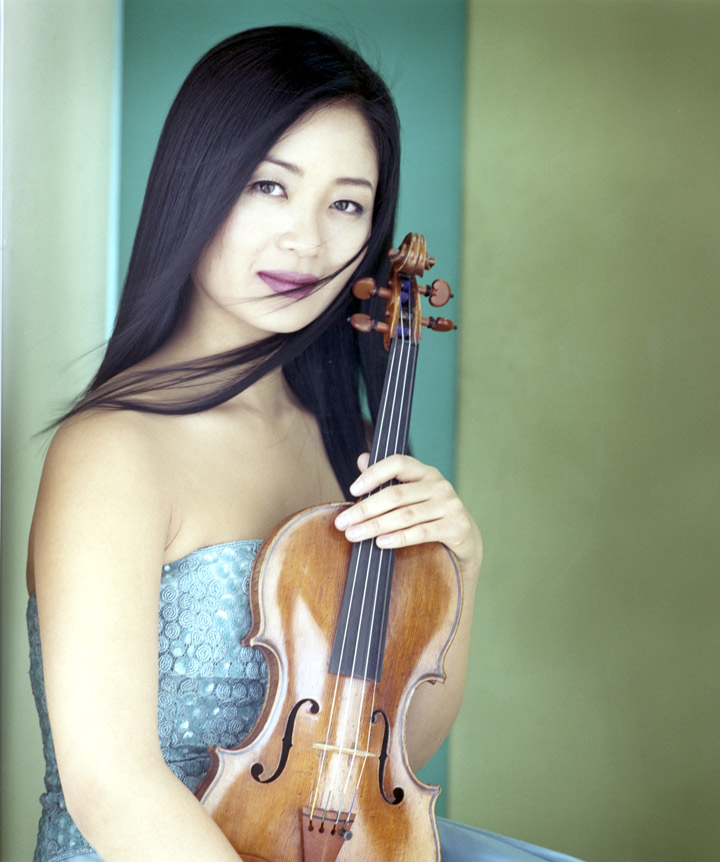

Korean name
- Hangul: 김지연
- RR: Gim Jiyeon
- MR: Kim Chiyŏn

Kim Chee-yun (Korean: 김지연; born 1970) is a violinist from Seoul, South Korea. Kim performed in Korea at the age of 13. She studied at the Juilliard School with Dorothy DeLay, Hyo Kang, and Felix Galimir. She won the Young Concert Artists International Auditions in 1989 which led to her New York City recital debut at Carnegie Hall. She records for the Denon label.

Kim was appointed Artist-in-Residence at the Southern Methodist University, Dallas Texas in 2008. Besides teaching, she tours and gives recitals and concert performances.

Kim plays the Stradivarius "Ex-Strauss" (Cremona, 1708), loaned by Samsung Corporation. Kim owns a Francesco Ruggieri violin made in the year 1669 which she purchased during the early years of her career. Her violin is speculated to have been buried underground for nearly two hundred years with its previous owner in Norway.

She appeared in the season 7 episode of Curb Your Enthusiasm, "Denise Handicap”.

== Accolades ==
- 1988 winner of The Juilliard School Concerto Competitions
- 1993 "Nan Pa" award (Korea)
- 1990 Avery Fisher Career Grant winner

== Discography ==
- Vocalise - Violin Show Pieces
- French Violin Sonatas
- Mendelssohn & Vieuxtemps Concertos
- Szymanowski & Franck Violin Sonatas
- Vocalise d'amour
- Sentimental Memories
- Penderecki: Orchestral Works Volume 4
- The Very Best of Chee-Yun
- Lalo: Symphonie Espagnole and Saint-Saëns violin concerto No. 3 (1997)
