= Ory Shihor =

Israeli-American musical artist

Ory Shihor אורי שחיבר
- Born: Tel Aviv, Israel
- Genres: Classical
- Occupations: Pianist, pedagogue
- Instrument: Piano
- Website: www.oryshihor.com

Ory Shihor (Hebrew: אורי שחיבר) is an Israeli-American pianist, pedagogue, and co-founder of the California based Ory Shihor Institute. Shihor performs, lectures, holds masterclasses and serves on the juries of international piano competitions.

Shihor was the founder of the Colburn Music Academy and served as its dean between 2010 and 2017. He also served as piano professor at the Colburn Conservatory between 2008 and 2019.

Shihor was born in Tel Aviv. Success as a pianist came early for him. At the age of twelve he began receiving scholarships from the America Israel Cultural Foundation and within three years he was studying at the Curtis Institute of Music in the United States.

== Early life and education ==
As a child in Tel Aviv, Shihor studied under Neima Rosh and later with Dr. Emanuel Krasovsky. He was a recipient of America Israel Cultural Foundation scholarships from the age of twelve. At fifteen, he came to the United States to study at the Curtis Institute of Music in Philadelphia under the pianist Jorge Bolet. Shihor graduated from the Juilliard School in New York City with a Bachelor of Music after studying under pianist and pedagogue Russell Sherman.

== Career ==
Shihor's professional career has included performances at The Kennedy Center, Ravinia Festival in Chicago, The Edinburgh Festival in Scotland, Dusseldorf's Tonhalle in Germany, 92nd Street "Y" in New York, and the Wallis Annenberg Center for the Performing Arts in Beverly Hills.

Shihor was awarded the Gina Bachauer Prize while at the Juilliard School, the Young Concert Artists International Auditions, the Arthur Rubinstein International Piano Master Competition and first prize at the Washington International Piano Competition.

Shihor joined the faculty of the Colburn Conservatory in Los Angeles in 2009 and served as professor of piano until 2019, while there, he founded the Colburn Music Academy for young artists and served as its dean from 2010 until 2017.

Shihor regularly serves as juror at many international competitions, including the James Mottram International Piano Competition (UK), the Arthur Rubinstein Junior Piano Competition (China), the Virginia Waring International Piano Competition and the Young Artist Piano Competition at Emory University (USA). In 2017 he was invited to join the judging panel of the TV series "Wonderkids," which was filmed in Ho Chi Minh City and aired on Vietnam's HTV3.

As a performing artist, Shihor is noted for being "boldly individualistic" (New York Times) and "not afraid to take risks" (The Washington Post). He is a Bösendorfer and Yamaha artist.

== Awards ==
- 1986, 1st Prize Winner, Young Concert Artists
- 1988, 1st Prize Winner, Gina Bachauer Prize, Juilliard
- 1998, Prize Winner, Arthur Rubinstein International Piano Master Competition
- 1999, 1st prize, Washington International Piano Competition

== Projects ==
In 1993, Shihor toured as soloist with the Liege Philharmonique of Belgium for their 15-city North American tour.

Shihor performed all 32 Beethoven piano sonatas during a series of 8 concerts in Zipper Hall in Los Angeles between 2005 and 2007.

Judge, Wonderkids TV Series, HTV3, Vietnam, 2017

Shihor's concert-drama 'Last Thoughts: Schubert's Final Works', written by Hershey Felder, premiered in 2018 at the Wallis Annenberg Center for the Performing Arts in Beverly Hills.

Shihor's 'Beethoven's Most Beloved Sonatas,' will premiere at the Wallis Annenberg Center for the Performing Arts in April 2020.
