= Alban Gerhardt =

German cellist (born 1969)

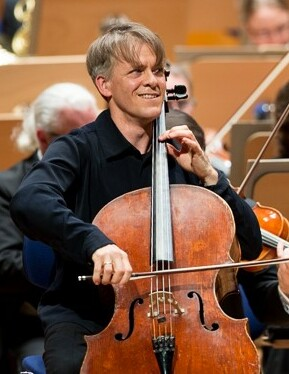
- Gerhardt in 2015

Background information
- Born: 25 May 1969 (age 57); Berlin, Germany
- Genre: Classical
- Occupation: Musician
- Instrument: Cello
- Years active: 1987–present
- Labels: Hyperion; Deutsche Grammophon; EMI
- Website: albangerhardt.com

Alban Gerhardt (born 25 May 1969) is a German cellist. Since his debut with the Berlin Philharmonic in 1991, he has appeared with many of the world's leading orchestras.

== Early life and education ==
Born to a musical family, Gerhardt's mother sang coloratura soprano, and his father, Axel Gerhardt, was a second violinist of the Berlin Philharmonic for over 40 years. His brother Darius is a guitarist.

Gerhardt took up both the piano and cello at age eight, and studied with Marion Vetter and Götz Teutsch of the Berlin Philharmonic, and eventually began working under Markus Nyikos. He had also been a student of Boris Pergamenschikow and Frans Helmerson.

== Career ==
Gerhardt's debut came in February 1987, when he performed the Haydn Cello Concerto No. 2 at the Philharmonie Berlin. He won top prizes in several competitions including the 1990 Deutsche Musikwettbewerb in Bonn and the ARD International Music Competition in Munich that same year. In 1993, he won the International Leonard Rose Cello Competition and in 1994, the Young Concert Artists Audition in New York. His international career was launched in 1991 when he made his debut with the Berlin Philharmonic and Semyon Bychkov. Gerhardt was a member of the BBC Radio 3 New Generation Artists scheme from 1999 to 2001.

Gerhardt regularly appears with many of the world's leading orchestras such as the Royal Concertgebouw Orchestra, Berlin Philharmonic, London Philharmonic Orchestra, Gewandhausorchester Leipzig, Symphonieorchester des Bayerischen Rundfunks, Tonhalle-Orchester Zürich, Munich Philharmonic and the Orchestre National de France. In the US, he has appeared with the Boston Symphony Orchestra, Chicago Symphony Orchestra, Cleveland Orchestra, New York Philharmonic, and the Philadelphia Orchestra among others.

At the 2009 BBC Proms, Gerhardt performed the world premiere of Unsuk Chin's Cello Concerto, which Chin composed for him. He subsequently recorded the concerto with the Seoul Philharmonic Orchestra and Myung-Whun Chung for Deutsche Grammophon. He has also collaborated with other composers such as Thomas Larcher, Brett Dean, Jörg Widmann, Osvaldo Golijov, Mathias Hinke and Matthias Pintscher.

Gerhardt has won three ECHO Klassik Awards (1998, 2003 & 2009) as well as ICMA and MIDEM Classic awards. His DG recording of Unsuk Chin's Cello Concerto won the BBC Music Magazine Award in 2015 and was nominated for a Gramophone Award in 2015. He has made several commercial records for Hyperion. He has also recorded for Chandos Records.

Gerhardt plays a Matteo Goffriller cello, made in 1710. In addition to his concert performances, Gerhardt has done various projects that have involved performance outside of traditional concert halls, such as in schools, hospitals and young offender institutions. In 2012, he also began collaboration with Deutsche Bahn, involving live performances on the main commuter routes in Germany.

== Personal life ==
Gerhardt has been married twice. His marriage to his first wife, Katalina, produced a son. His second wife is the violinist Gergana Gergova, and the couple have a son.
