= Unsuk Chin =

South Korean composer (born 1961)

- Born: July 14, 1961 (age 65); Seoul, South Korea
- Occupation: Composer
- Style: Contemporary classical

Korean name
- Hangul: 진은숙
- Hanja: 陳銀淑
- RR: Jin Eunsuk
- MR: Chin Ŭnsuk

Unsuk Chin (Korean: 진은숙 [tɕin ɯn.suk]; born July 14, 1961) is a South Korean composer of contemporary classical music, who is based in Berlin, Germany. Chin was a self-taught pianist from a young age and studied composition at Seoul National University as well as with György Ligeti at the Hochschule für Musik und Theater Hamburg.

The recipient of numerous awards, she won the 2004 Grawemeyer Award for her Violin Concerto No. 1, the 2010 Music Composition Prize of the Prince Pierre Foundation for the ensemble piece Gougalōn and the Ernst von Siemens Music Prize in 2024. In 2019, writers of The Guardian ranked her Cello Concerto (2009) the 11th greatest work of art music since 2000, with Andrew Clements describing it as "perhaps the most original and entertainingly disconcerting of all of [her concertos], cast in four brilliant movements that never quite conform to type".

== Biography ==
Unsuk Chin was born in Seoul, South Korea. She studied composition with Sukhi Kang at Seoul National University and won several international prizes in her early 20s. In 1985, Chin won the Gaudeamus Foundation located in Amsterdam, with her piece Spektra for three celli, which was composed for her graduation project. She also received an academic grant to study in Germany, where she moved that same year. There she studied with György Ligeti at the Hochschule für Musik und Theater Hamburg from 1985 to 1988.

Her second opera, Die dunkle Seite des Mondes (Dark Side of the Moon), for which she wrote her own libretto, was given its world premiere at the Hamburg State Opera on 18 May 2025, conducted by Kent Nagano and staged by the Irish theatre company Dead Centre.

In 1988, Chin worked as a freelance composer at the electronic music studio of Technische Universität Berlin, releasing seven works. Her first electronic piece was Gradus ad Infinitum, which was composed in 1989. Her first large orchestral piece, Die Troerinnen (1986, rev.1990), for women's voices, was premiered by the Bergen Philharmonic Orchestra in 1990. In 1991, her breakthrough work Acrostic Wordplay was premiered by the Nieuw Ensemble. Since then, it has been performed in more than 20 countries in Europe, Asia and North America. Chin's collaboration with the Ensemble Intercontemporain, which has led to several commissions from them, started in 1994 with Fantaisie mecanique. Since 1995, Chin has been published exclusively by Boosey & Hawkes. In 1999, Chin began an artistic collaboration with Kent Nagano, who has since premiered six of her works.

Chin's Violin Concerto No. 1 was awarded the 2004 University of Louisville Grawemeyer Award for Music Composition. It was premiered in 2002 by Viviane Hagner. Since then, it has been programmed in 14 countries in Europe, Asia and North America, and performed, among others, by Christian Tetzlaff, the Berlin Philharmonic and Simon Rattle in 2005.

In 2007, she was awarded the Kyung-Ahm Prize.

Chin's works have been performed by orchestras around the world, including the Berlin Philharmonic, the New York Philharmonic, the Chicago Symphony Orchestra, the London Philharmonic Orchestra, the Los Angeles Philharmonic, and many others. Her works have been conducted by Kent Nagano, Simon Rattle, Alan Gilbert, Gustavo Dudamel, Myung-whun Chung, Esa-Pekka Salonen, Neeme Järvi, Péter Eötvös, David Robertson and George Benjamin. Chin's music has been highlighted at the 2014 Lucerne Festival, the Festival Musica in Strasbourg, the Suntory Summer Festival, the 2013 Stockholm Concert Hall's Tonsätterfestival and at Settembre Musica in Italy. In 2001/2002, she was appointed composer-in-residence at Deutschen Symphonie-Orchester Berlin.

Chin was closely associated with the Seoul Philharmonic Orchestra from 2006 to 2017, at invitation from Myung-whun Chung, as their composer-in-residence and director of their Ars Nova Series for contemporary music, which she founded herself and in which more than 200 Korean premieres of central works of classical modernism and contemporary music were being presented. Chin later became the orchestra's artistic adviser. From 2011 to 2020, she oversaw the London-based Philharmonia Orchestra's Music of Today series at the invitation of its then chief conductor Esa-Pekka Salonen. Chin has been artistic director of the Tongyeong International Music Festival since 2022 and directed its 2026 edition, held from 27 March to 5 April 2026 under the theme "Facing Depth". Since 2022 she has also been artistic director of the Weiwuying International Music Festival in Kaohsiung, Taiwan.

== Style ==
Chin does not regard her music as belonging to any specific culture. Chin names Béla Bartók, Igor Stravinsky, Claude Debussy, Anton Webern, Iannis Xenakis, and György Ligeti, among others, as 20th-century composers of special importance for her. Chin regards her working experience with electronic music and her preoccupation with Balinese Gamelan as influential for her work. In her orchestral work Miroirs des temps, Chin has also used compositional concepts of Medieval composers, such as Machaut and Ciconia, by employing and evolving techniques such as musical palindromes and crab canons.

The texts of Chin's vocal music are often based on experimental poetry, and occasionally they are self-referential, employing techniques such as acrostics, anagrams and palindromes, all of which are also reflected in the compositional structure.

Consequently, Chin has set music to poems by writers such as Inger Christensen, Harry Mathews, Gerhard Rühm or Unica Zürn, and the title of Cantatrix Sopranica is derived from a nonsense treatise by Georges Perec. However, in Kalá, Chin has also composed works with less experimental texts by writers such as Gunnar Ekelöf, Paavo Haavikko, and Arthur Rimbaud. Troerinnen is based on a play by Euripides, and Le silence des Sirènes juxtaposes texts by Homer and James Joyce.

Playful aspects are dominant also in Chin's opera Alice in Wonderland, which is based on Lewis Carroll's classic of the same name. The opera's libretto was written by David Henry Hwang and the composer. The Munich production, which has been released on DVD by Unitel, was directed by Achim Freyer, and it was selected 'Premiere of the Year' by an international critics' poll conducted in 2007 by the German opera magazine Opernwelt.

Some of Chin's works are influenced by extramusical associations and other art genres, such as her orchestral work Rocaná which alludes to Olafur Elíasson's installations, or her ensemble works Graffiti and cosmigimmicks, the latter of which was influenced by the art of pantomime and by Samuel Beckett.

== Selected works ==
Orchestral
Year	Title
1993	Santica Ekatela for orchestra
2008	Rocaná for orchestra
2014	Mannequin for orchestra
2017 (rev. 2020)	Chorós Chordón for orchestra
2019	SPIRA – Concerto for Orchestra
2019	Frontispiece for orchestra
2020	Subito con forza for orchestra
2022	Alaraph 'Ritus des Herzschlags' for orchestra

Concertante
Year	Title
1996–97	Piano Concerto
2001	Violin Concerto No. 1
2002	Double Concerto for piano, percussion and ensemble
2009–13	Cello Concerto
2009	Šu for sheng and orchestra
2013–14	Clarinet Concerto
2020–21	Violin Concerto No. 2

Other ensemble
Year	Title
1984	Gestalten for ensemble
1985	Spektra for three cellos
1994–97	Fantaisie mécanique for trumpet, trombone, two percussions and piano
2009–11	Gougalōn. Scenes from a Street Theater for Ensemble
2012	cosmigimmicks. A musical pantomime for seven instrumentalists
2012–13	Graffiti

Piano
Year	Title
1995	Piano Etude No.2 (Sequenzen)
1995	Piano Etude No. 3 (Scherzo ad libitum)
1995	Piano Etude No. 4 (Scalen)
1999	Piano Etude No.1 (in C)
2000	Piano Etude No.6 (Grains)
2003	Piano Etude No.5 (Toccata)

Opera
Year	Title
2004–07	Alice in Wonderland
2024–25	Dark Side of the Moon

Vocal and choral
Year	Title
1986–1990	Troerinnen, for 3 sopranos, women's choir und orchestra, after Euripides' The Trojan Women
1991–93	Akrostichon – Wortspiel, for soprano and ensemble
1999–2000	Miroirs des temps, for 4 singers and orchestra
2000–01	Kalá, for soprano, bass, mixed choir and orchestra
2004	snagS&Snarls for soprano and orchestra
2004–2011	Scenes from Alice in Wonderland for soprano, mezzo-soprano and orchestra
2005	Cantatrix Sopranica for two sopranos, countertenor and ensemble
2014	Le silence des Sirènes for soprano and orchestra
2016	Le Chant des Enfants des Étoiles for mixed choir, children's choir, organ and orchestra

Tape/electronics
Year	Title
1989–1990	Gradus ad Infinitum for 8 pianos for tape
1992	El aliento de la sombra
1995	ParaMetaString for string quartet and electronics
1998	Xi for ensemble and electronics
1998	Allegro ma non troppo for percussion and electronics
2000	Spectres-spéculaires for violin and electronics
2006–07	Double Bind? for violin and live electronics
2010–11	Fanfare chimérique for two spatially distributed wind ensembles and live electronics

== Awards and prizes ==
Year	Award
1984	International Rostrum of Composers for the chamber music work Gestalten
1985	First Prize of Gaudeamus Foundation for Spektra
1993	First Prize at the Contest for Orchestra Works to Commemorate the Semicentennial for the Tokyo Government
1997	First Prize for Contemporary Piano Music at the Concours International de Piano d'Orléans for the Piano Studies Nos. 2–4
1999	First Prize at Concours Internationaux de Musique et d'Art Sonore Electroacoustiques de Bourges for Xi
2004	University of Louisville Grawemeyer Award for Violin Concerto
2005	Arnold Schönberg Prize
2007	Heidelberger Künstlerinnenpreis
2010	Music Composition Prize of the Prince Pierre Foundation for Gougalōn
2012	Ho-Am Prize in the Arts
2014	Seventh Roche Commission
2017	Wihuri Sibelius Prize
2018	Marie-Josée Kravis Prize for New Music
2019	Bach Prize of the Free and Hanseatic City of Hamburg
2021	Léonie Sonning Music Prize
2024	Ernst von Siemens Music Prize
2025	BBVA Foundation Frontiers of Knowledge Award Music and Opera
2026	Grand Prize of the 14th Daewon Music Awards

=== Memberships ===
- 2019 Member of the Freie Akademie der Künste Hamburg
- 2026 Member of the Academy of Arts, Berlin

== Portrait CDs and DVDs ==
- Unsuk Chin: Akrostichon – Wortspiel and other works. ensemble intercontemporain. CD. Deutsche Grammophon, 2005
- Unsuk Chin: Alice in Wonderland. Bayerische Staatsoper, Kent Nagano. DVD. Unitel, 2008
- Unsuk Chin: Rocaná, Violin Concerto. Viviane Hagner, Kent Nagano, Montreal Symphony Orchestra. CD. Analekta, 2009.
- Unsuk Chin: Xi and other works. (reissue of Akrostichon – Wortspiel CD). ensemble intercontemporain. CD. Kairos, 2011.
- Unsuk Chin: Three Concertos. Myung-whun Chung, Alban Gerhardt, Sunwook Kim, Wu Wei, Seoul Philharmonic Orchestra. CD. Deutsche Grammophon, 2014

== Other selected recordings ==
- Spektra für drei Celli. In: Ladder of Escape 6. Taco Kooistra, Viola de Hoog, Eduard van Regteren Altena. CD. ATTACCA, 1992
- Allegro ma non troppo. In: Fifty Years Studio TU Berlin. EMF Media, DVD 054, 2008
- Cantatrix Sopranica. In: Sprechgesänge – Speech Songs. musikFabrik, Stefan Asbury. CD. WERGO, 2010.
- cosmigimmicks. In: "Dokumentation Wittener Tage für neue Kammermusik 2013". Celso Antunes, Nieuw Ensemble. CD. WDR, 2013
- Fantaisie mécanique. In: "Euclidian Abyss". Vimbayi Kaziboni, Internationale Ensemble Modern Akademie. CD. Ensemble Modern Records, 2013
- Gougalōn. In: "Contact! 2012–13 season". Alan Gilbert, New York Philharmonic. Mp3-CD. New York Philharmonic Records, 2013
- Six Piano Etudes. Mei Yi Foo. In: Musical Toys. CD. Odradek Records, 2012
- Six Piano Etudes. Yejin Gil. In: "Fulgurances". CD. Solstice, 2013
- Advice from a Caterpiller, bass clarinet solo 2007 [8'] (from Alice in Wonderland). Fie Schouten, CD Ladder of Escape 11 ATT2014140
- Six Piano Etudes. Clare Hammond. In: "Etude". CD. BIS, 2014
- ParaMetaString. Esmé Quartet. In: "To Be Loved". CD. Alpha, 2020
