= Seoul Philharmonic Orchestra =

South Korean orchestra

- Orchestra
- Sejong Center
- Native name: 서울시립교향악단
- Short name: SPO
- Founded: 1945; 81 years ago
- Concert hall: Sejong Center
- Music director: Jaap van Zweden
- Website: Official website

The Seoul Philharmonic Orchestra (SPO) is a South Korean orchestra based in Seoul. Founded in 1945, it is one of the oldest orchestras in South Korea. Its first foreign tour came on a 1965 trip to Japan, followed by performances in Southeast Asia in 1977, the United States in 1982, 1986, and 1996, a 1988 tour of Europe before the Seoul Olympics that year, and a 1997 performance in Beijing. The philharmonic has been an incorporated foundation since 2005.

== Overview ==
Founded in January 1948, the Seoul Philharmonic Orchestra has a longer history than any other Korean orchestra. In February 1948, the orchestra held its opening concert, conducted by Seong-Tae Kim. In October of the same year, the Seoul Philharmonic Society was formed to provide support for the orchestra. The society published the music monthly Philharmonie in the following year. After a subscription concert in the Seoul Civic Hall on July 25, 1950, the orchestra had to suspend its activities due to the outbreak of the Korean War, but resumed performance with the name of the Naval Symphony Orchestra, five months later. Its first foreign tour came on a 1965 trip to Japan, followed by performances in Southeast Asia in 1977, the United States in 1982, 1986, and 1996, a 1988 tour of Europe before the Seoul Olympics that year, and a 1997 performance in Beijing. The philharmonic is an incorporated foundation since 2005.

In August 1957, the Seoul Metropolitan Council passed "The Seoul Metropolitan Ordinances to Install a City-Run Orchestra," and the Naval Symphony Orchestra became the Seoul Philharmonic Orchestra, the first Korean orchestra funded by a government. The launching ceremony for the orchestra with triple winds took place in the city council's chamber. Saeng-Ryo Kim was appointed its first chief conductor. Since then, the SPO has helped the symphonies of Beethoven, Brahms, Mozart, and Tchaikovsky take root as a basic repertoire in the Korean music community. Through these concerts, Korean musicians such as Kyung-Sook Lee, Kun-Woo Paik, Kyung-Wha Chung, Dong-Suk Kang, and Myung-Whun Chung attained increased recognition.

With the aim of growing into a major orchestra, the Seoul Philharmonic Orchestra was re-launched as an incorporated foundation on June 1, 2005, and appointed Myung-Whun Chung as its music director (he had been artistic advisor in 2005). With Chung, in 2014, the Seoul Philharmonic made its debut at the BBC Proms.

The orchestra focuses on interaction with modern music. According to the Los Angeles Times, the Seoul Philharmonic Orchestra "has the reputation for championing more new music than any other major Asian orchestra". It adopted the composer-in-residence system for the first time in Korea when it was re-launched as an incorporated foundation and welcomed Unsuk Chin as its first composer-in-residence. Chin is the founder-director of a series of modern music titled Ars Nova since 2006. It has featured conductors such as Peter Eötvös, Kwamé Ryan, Thierry Fischer, Susanna Mälkki, François-Xavier Roth, Ilan Volkov, Baldur Brönnimann and Roland Kluttig, among others. Until 2011, the series had presented around 100 Korean premieres - half of them being Asian premieres - of works by leading 20th- and 21st-century composers including Anton von Webern, Igor Stravinsky, Olivier Messiaen, John Cage, Giacinto Scelsi, Witold Lutoslawski, Iannis Xenakis, György Ligeti, Pierre Boulez and György Kurtág. In 2009, the series collaborated with IRCAM, the Paris-based center for electronic music. Korea. Since 2011, the Seoul Philharmonic Orchestra has commissioned or co-commissioned orchestral works by composers such as Pascal Dusapin, Peter Eötvös, Tristan Murail and York Höller for the 'Ars Nova' series. Additionally, several commissions by major Korean composers have been premiered. The orchestra signed a contract with Deutsche Grammophon (DG) in 2011 to release 10 albums over five years, the first time that an Asian orchestra has signed such an extensive contract. An album with music by Unsuk Chin was named an International Classical Music Award and a BBC Music Magazine Award winner in the Contemporary Music category.

Myung-Whun Chung was the orchestra's music director from 2005 until his resignation in December 2015. During his tenure, the orchestra became the first Asian orchestra to sign a major-label record deal, and gave its first performance at The Proms in August 2014. In September 2016, the orchestra announced the appointments of Thierry Fischer as its principal guest conductor and of Markus Stenz as conductor-in-residence, effective January 2017, with initial contracts of 3 years.

In April 2019, the orchestra announced the appointment of Osmo Vänskä as its next music director, effective January 2020, with an initial contract of 3 years. Vänskä concluded his music directorship of the Seoul Philharmonic Orchestra at the close of 2022. In September 2022, the orchestra announced the appointment of Jaap van Zweden as its next music director, effective January 2024, with an initial contract of 5 years.

== Collaborations with K-Pop ==
In June 2020, the Seoul Philharmonic Orchestra partnered with SM Entertainment to establish SM Classics, a classical musical label focused on reimagining K-pop hits with orchestral arrangements. This collaboration led to performances of orchestral arrangements of popular K-pop songs, such as Red Velvet's "Red Flavor" and "Feel My Rhythm," as well as Aespa's "Black Mamba." In February 2025, they co-presented the "SM Classics Live 2025 with Seoul Philharmonic Orchestra," featuring orchestral arrangements of past hits from artists such as BoA, Girls' Generation, Red Velvet, NCT, Aespa, Exo, Shinee, Riize, and more, in celebration of SM Entertainment's 30th anniversary and Seoul Philharmonic Orchestra's 80th anniversary. The two-day event was held on February 14, 2025, at Seoul Arts Center and on February 15, 2025, at Lotte Concert Hall. This event also marked the "world's first live K-pop orchestra concert."

== Conductors ==
=== Principal Conductor & Artistic Directors ===
- Saeng-Ryeo Kim (1948–1961)
- Man-Bok Kim (1961–1969)
- Gyeong-Su Won (1970–1971)
- Jae-Dong Jeong (1974–1990)
- Eun-Seong Park (1990–1991)
- Gyeong-Su Won (1994–1996)
- Mark Ermler (2000–2002)
- Seung Kwak (2003)
- Myung-Whun Chung (2005–2015)
- Osmo Vänskä (2020–2022)
- Jaap van Zweden (2024–present)

=== Principal Guest Conductor ===
- Thierry Fischer (2017–2020)

=== Conductor-In-Residence ===
- Markus Stenz (2017–2021)

=== Associate Conductor ===
- Eun-Seong Park (1984–1989)
- Shi-Yeon Sung (2009–2013)
- Su-Yeol Choi (2014–2017)
- Wilson Ng (2019–2022)
- Peter Biloen (2024)
- David Yi (2020–present)

=== Composer-in-Residence ===
- Unsuk Chin (2006–2018, also artistic director of Ars Nova series)

== Presidents ==
- Pal-Seong Lee (2005–2008)
- Jooho Kim (2009–2012)
- Hyeon-Jeong Park (2013–2014)
- Heung-Sik Choi (2015–2018)
- Eun-Kyung Kang (2018–2021)
- Shon Eun-gyeong (2021–present)

== Recordings ==
- Ahn Eak-tai: Symphonic Fantasia "Korea" (Excerpt) / Four Korean Folk Songs, conducted by Jae-Dong Jeong, Sung-Eum Records LP 1983.
- Pyotr Ilyich Tchaikovsky: Romeo and Juliet, Marche Slave / Franz Liszt: Les préludes / Yoon-Joo Jeong: Gayageum Concerto theme by Hwang Byung-Ki (with Seung-Hi Yang), conducted by Jae-Dong Jeong, Seoul Records LP/Compact Cassette 1987.
- César Franck: Symphony in D minor / Sergei Rachmaninoff: Piano Concerto No. 2 (with Hye-Kyeong Lee), conducted by Jae-Dong Jeong, SKC CD 1989.
- Edward Elgar: Salut d'Amour (version for orchestra) / Ermanno Wolf-Ferrari: First & Second Intermezzos from I gioielli della Madonna / Edvard Grieg: Solveig's Song from Peer Gynt / Wolfgang Amadeus Mozart: Andante from Divertimento K.136 (125a) / Bedřich Smetana: Dance of Comedians from The Bartered Bride / George Enescu: Romanian Rhapsody No. 2 / Wolfgang Amadeus Mozart: Menuetto from Symphony No. 39 / Pyotr Ilyich Tchaikovsky: Andante cantabile from String Quartet No. 1 (version for string orchestra) / Edward Elgar: Allegro piacevole from Serenade for Strings / Joseph Haydn: Allegro spiritoso from Symphony No. 83, conducted by Gyeong-Su Won, Samsung Nices CD 1995. (Encore collection from subscription concerts during the year of 1994)
- Max Bruch: Violin Concerto No. 1 (with Ho-Young Pi) / Antonín Dvořák: Cello Concerto (with Young-Hoon Song), conducted by Chi-Yong Chung, Seoul Arts Center CD 2001.
- Ludwig van Beethoven: Symphonies Nos. 5 & 6, conducted by Myung-whun Chung, Seoul Philharmonic Orchestra CD 2006.
- Johannes Brahms: Symphony No. 1 & Academic Festival Overture, conducted by Myung-whun Chung, Seoul Philharmonic Orchestra CD 2007.
- Antonín Dvořák: Symphony No. 9, conducted by Myung-whun Chung, Seoul Philharmonic Orchestra CD 2008.
- Igor Stravinsky: The Rite of Spring, conducted by Myung-whun Chung, Seoul Philharmonic Orchestra CD 2009.
- Claude Debussy: La mer / Maurice Ravel: Ma mère l'oye & La valse, conducted by Myung-whun Chung, Deutsche Grammophon 2011.
- Johannes Brahms: Symphony No. 2, conducted by Myung-whun Chung, Universal Music Korea 2011. (as a bonus disk of 33-CDs boxset 'Myung-whun Chung: DG Recordings 1991-2010')
- Gustav Mahler: Symphony No. 1, conducted by Myung-whun Chung, Deutsche Grammophon 2011.
- Gustav Mahler: Symphony No. 2 (with Myung Joo Lee, Petra Lang, National Chorus of Korea, Seoul Metropolitan Chorus, Seoul Motet Choir & Grande Opera Choir), conducted by Myung-whun Chung, Deutsche Grammophon 2012.
- Pyotr Ilyich Tchaikovsky: Symphony No. 6 / Sergei Rachmaninoff: Vocalise, conducted by Myung-whun Chung, Deutsche Grammophon 2012.
- Ludwig van Beethoven: Piano Concerto No. 5 (with Sunwook Kim) & Symphony No. 5, conducted by Myung-whun Chung, Deutsche Grammophon 2013.
- Ludwig van Beethoven: Symphony No. 9 (with Kathleen Kim, Songmi Yang, Yosep Kang, Samuel Youn, National Chorus of Korea, Seoul Motet Choir & Anyang Civic Chorale), conducted by Myung-whun Chung, Deutsche Grammophon 2013.
- Unsuk Chin: Piano Concerto (with Sunwook Kim), Cello Concerto (with Alban Gerhardt) & Šu for sheng and orchestra (with Wu Wei), conducted by Myung-whun Chung, Deutsche Grammophon 2014.
- Gustav Mahler: Symphony No. 9, conducted by Myung-whun Chung, Deutsche Grammophon 2014.
- Gustav Mahler: Symphony No. 5, conducted by Myung-whun Chung, Deutsche Grammophon 2015.
- Ludwig van Beethoven: Overture Leonore No. 3 / Camille Saint-Saëns: Symphony No. 3 / Seong-Hwan Choi: Arirang, conducted by Myung-whun Chung, Deutsche Grammophon 2017. (from opening concert of the Lotte Concert Hall, Seoul)
- Isang Yun: Legend for orchestra 'Silla', Violin Concerto III (with Sueye Park), Chamber Symphony I, conducted by Osmo Vänskä, BIS Records 2022.
