= Yekwon Sunwoo =

South Korean pianist (born 1989)

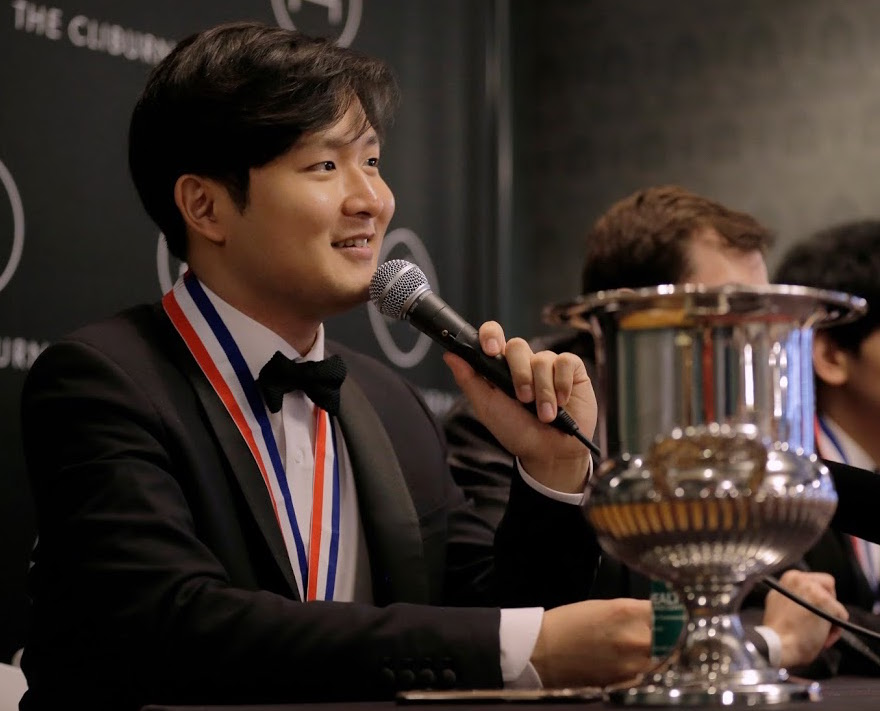
- Yekwon at June 2017 press conference after winning gold medal at the Fifteenth Van Cliburn International Piano Competition
- Born: February 10, 1989 (age 37); Anyang, Gyeonggi, South Korea
- Occupation: Classical pianist
- Years active: 2004–present

Korean name
- Hangul: 선우예권
- RR: Seonu Yegwon
- MR: Sŏnu Yegwŏn

Yekwon Sunwoo (Korean: 선우예권; born February 10, 1989) is a South Korean classical pianist. In 2017, at 28 years old, Sunwoo was the first Korean to win the gold medal at the Van Cliburn International Piano Competition. He won the Sendai International Music Competition in 2013.

== Background ==
Sunwoo was born in Anyang, South Korea in 1989. He began studying piano at the age of 8, drawn to the instrument from hearing his two older sisters play. By 2004 at the age of 15, he had given both his recital and orchestra debuts in Seoul. Sunwoo attended Seoul Arts High School in South Korea. While living in Korea, Sunwoo studied with Min-ja Shin and Sun-wha Kim.

At the age of 15, Sunwoo moved to the United States to attend the Curtis Institute of Music where he received the Rachmaninoff prize and studied with Seymour Lipkin. After graduating with his bachelor's degree, Sunwoo then earned his master's degree studying with Robert McDonald at The Juilliard School, where he won both the Munz Scholarship Competition and the Arthur Rubinstein Prize. He then earned his artist diploma from the Mannes School of Music studying with Richard Goode. Sunwoo currently studies under Bernd Goetzke at the Hochschule für Musik, Theater und Medien Hannover in Germany.

== Career ==
After winning the 2008 Florida International Piano Competition, Sunwoo gave his Carnegie Hall debut in New York City in 2009. He went on to win several other competitions including the William Kapell International Piano Competition, Vendome Prize held at the Verbier Festival, and the International German Piano Award.

On June 10, 2017, Sunwoo won the gold medal of the Fifteenth Van Cliburn International Piano Competition in Fort Worth, Texas, becoming the first Korean to do so. The quadrennial competition, named in honor of pianist Van Cliburn, included four rounds of performances consisting of two 45-minute solo recitals and one 60-minute solo recital with no overlapping repertoire in addition to a piano quintet performed with the Brentano String Quartet and two piano concertos played with the Fort Worth Symphony Orchestra, one under Nicholas McGegan and other under Leonard Slatkin. The Competition received 290 applications from which 30 were invited to compete in the live competition. By winning the gold medal, Sunwoo was awarded the Van Cliburn Cup, $50,000, three years of career management, a live recording and a recording partnership with Universal Music Group, press kits, videos, a website, and performance attire by Neiman Marcus.

Two weeks after the conclusion of the 2017 Cliburn competition, Decca Gold released Cliburn Gold 2017 which includes Sunwoo's live performances from the Competition.

Sunwoo has performed with many top-tier orchestras including the Baltimore Symphony Orchestra with Marin Alsop, Orchestre National de Belgique, Royal Scottish National Orchestra, Houston Symphony Orchestra with James Feddeck, and The Juilliard Orchestra with Itzhak Perlman. He has given recitals in venues across the world including the Berliner Philharmonie, Elbphilharmonie in Hamburg, Hamarikyu Asahi Hall in Tokyo, Wigmore Hall in London, and Kumho Art Hall in Seoul.

Following an announcement in December 2017, Sunwoo is currently managed worldwide by Keynote Artist Management and in Korea by MOC Production.

=== Chamber music ===
Sunwoo is an active chamber musician and has performed with such ensembles as the Jerusalem (during the final round of the 2014 Vendome Prize Piano Competition held in Verbier) and Brentano String Quartets in addition to violinist Ida Kafavian, cellists Edgar Moreau, Gary Hoffman, and Peter Wiley, and pianist Anne-Marie McDermott. He has released two albums with violinist Benjamin Beilman, Spectrum and Prokofiev Violin Sonatas. In 2007, he toured Central America including Costa Rica, Guatemala, and Panama with the Kumho Asiana Cultural Foundation. He has been presented by the Chamber Music Society of Lincoln Center and invited to several music festivals including Summit Music, Bowdoin International, and Toronto.

== Awards ==
Year	Event	Award
2017	Fifteenth Van Cliburn International Piano Competition	Gold medal
2015	International German Piano Award	First Prize
2014	Vendome Prize (held at the Verbier Festival)	First Prize
2013	Sendai International Music Competition	First Prize
2012	Piano Campus International Concours	First Prize and audience award
2012	William Kapell International Piano Competition	First Prize and audience and chamber awards
2009	Interlaken Classics Competition	First Prize
2008	Florida International Piano Competition	First Prize

== Discography ==
Album	Label	Release
Rachmaninoff, A Reflection	Decca Records	September 12, 2023
Mozart	Decca Records	November 24, 2020
Cliburn Gold 2017	Decca Gold	August 18, 2017
Crossing Spheres	Genuin	June 16, 2017
Spectrum with Benjamin Beilman	Warner Classics	March 11, 2016
Yekwon Sunwoo	Fontec	December 3, 2014
Prokofiev Violin Sonatas with Benjamin Beilman	Analekta	May 3, 2011
