= Sixteenth Van Cliburn International Piano Competition =

2022 event in Fort Worth, Texas, US

The Sixteenth Van Cliburn International Piano Competition took place in Fort Worth, Texas, USA from June 2 to 18, 2022 with 30 competitors from 14 countries. It was postponed one year from its regular quadrennial cycle in 2021 due to COVID-19. The edition's theme was "The World is Listening" and celebrated 60 years since its founding in 1962.

In light of the 2022 Russian invasion of Ukraine, The Cliburn faced pressure to ban Russian participants from the competition but ultimately chose to allow them; however, they also warned competitors that statements in support of the invasion or Russian president Vladimir Putin could result in disqualification. Two Russian competitors (Anna Geniushene and Ilya Shmukler) and the sole Ukrainian competitor (Dmytro Choni) reached the final round.

Eighteen-year-old Yunchan Lim of South Korea won the competition and gold medal. He became the second South Korean to win the competition, after Yekwon Sunwoo in the previous competition in 2017. Anna Geniushene, 31, of Russia won the silver medal, and Dmytro Choni, 28, of Ukraine won the bronze medal.

== Competition results, by rounds ==
=== Screening auditions ===
(United States) Fort Worth, Texas - PepsiCo Recital Hall, Texas Christian University, March 6–12, 2022

Seventy-two applicants accepted for a screening audition chosen from 388 total applicants from 51 countries were required to give a 25-minute recital before a live audience and the Screening Jury. Unlike the previous competition, which also had screening auditions in New York City, Asia, and Europe, this competition's screening auditions were solely in Fort Worth.

- (China) Tianxu An, age 23
- (Germany) Julius Asal, 25
- (Hungary) Adam Balogh, 24
- (Russia) Ivan Bessonov, 19
- (Israel) Daniel Borovitzky, 30
- (United States) Rachel Breen, 25
- (China) Yangrui Cai, 21
- (Spain) (Netherlands) Albert Cano Smit, 25
- (United States) Dominic Cheli, 28
- (China) Jiarui Cheng, 23
- (South Korea) Sae Yoon Chon, 26
- (Ukraine) Dmytro Choni, 28
- (South Korea) Kyubin Chung, 25
- (Russia) Tatiana Dorokhova, 30
- (France) Théo Fouchenneret, 28
- (Italy) Federico Gad Crema, 23
- (Russia) Anna Geniushene, 31
- (Italy) Francesco Granata, 23
- (Russia) Arseniy Gusev, 23
- (South Korea) Chi-Ho Han, 30
- (United Kingdom) George Harliono, 21
- (South Korea) Minsoo Hong, 29
- (South Korea) So Hyang In, 30
- (Canada) (United States) Carter Johnson, 25
- (Japan) Masaya Kamei, 20
- (Belarus) Uladzislau Khandohi, 20
- (United States) Andrew Hyungdo Kim, 26
- (South Korea) Do-Hyun Kim, 27
- (South Korea) Honggi Kim, 30
- (South Korea) Hyelim Kim, 25
- (South Korea) Junhyung Kim, 24
- (Russia) (United Kingdom) Maxim Kinasov, 28
- (Russia) Elizaveta Kliuchereva, 23
- (Russia) Aleksandr Kliuchko, 21
- (South Korea) Taek Gi Lee, 25
- (Australia) Shuan Hern Lee, 19
- (United States) Andrew Li, 22
- (China) Siqian Li, 29
- (China) Xiaoxuan Li, 20
- (China) Ying Li, 24
- (China) Yuzhang Li, 22
- (South Korea) Yunchan Lim, 18
- (Belarus) Denis Linnik, 26
- (United States) Kate Liu, 28
- (China) Ziyu Liu, 24
- (Taiwan) An-Chi Mai, 20
- (Canada) Jonathan Mak, 25
- (France) (Romania) Dimitri Malignan, 24
- (Netherlands) Aidan Mikdad, 20
- (Russia) Arsenii Mun, 23
- (Latvia) Georgijs Osokins, 27
- (Japan) Ainobu Ota, 29
- (South Korea) Jinhyung Park, 26
- (South Korea) Kyoungsun Park, 30
- (South Korea) Yeon-Min Park, 31
- (Mexico) Vladimir Petrov, 25
- (Austria) Philipp Scheucher, 29
- (South Korea) Changyong Shin, 28
- (Russia) Ilya Shmukler, 27
- (Russia) Vitaly Starikov, 27
- (United States) Clayton Stephenson, 23
- (China) Yutong Sun, 26
- (France) (Japan) Marcel Tadokoro, 28
- (Russia) Sergey Tanin, 26
- (Russia) Arseny Tarasevich-Nikolaev, 29
- (United Kingdom) Julian Trevelyan, 23
- (United Kingdom) Alexander Ullman, 30
- (Russia) Anastasia Vorotnaya, 27
- (China) Wynona Yinuo Wang, 25
- (China) Jiacheng Xiong, 25
- (Japan) Yuki Yoshimi, 22
- (South Korea) Jihyung Youn, 23
- (China) Xiaolu Zang, 22

=== Preliminary round ===
(United States) Fort Worth, Texas - Van Cliburn Concert Hall, Texas Christian University, June 2–4, 2022

Thirty competitors from 14 countries, selected solely on their artistry and announced on March 30, 2022, performed a 40-minute recital, which included the commissioned work, Fanfare Toccata, of 4–6 minutes by Stephen Hough.

- (China) Tianxu An, age 23
- (China) Yangrui Cai, 21
- (Spain) (Netherlands) Albert Cano Smit, 25
- (Ukraine) Dmytro Choni, 28
- (Italy) Federico Gad Crema, 23
- (Russia) Anna Geniushene, 31
- (Italy) Francesco Granata, 23
- (Russia) Arseniy Gusev, 23
- (Japan) Masaya Kamei, 20
- (Belarus) Uladzislau Khandohi, 20
- (South Korea) Honggi Kim, 30
- (Russia) Elizaveta Kliuchereva, 23
- (Australia) Shuan Hern Lee, 19
- (United States) Andrew Li, 22
- (South Korea) Yunchan Lim, 18
- (Belarus) Denis Linnik, 26
- (United States) Kate Liu, 28
- (China) Ziyu Liu, 24
- (Canada) Jonathan Mak, 25
- (Latvia) Georgijs Osokins, 27
- (Japan) Ainobu Ota, 29
- (South Korea) Jinhyung Park, 26
- (South Korea) Changyong Shin, 28
- (Russia) Ilya Shmukler, 27
- (Russia) Vitaly Starikov, 27
- (United States) Clayton Stephenson, 23
- (China) Yutong Sun, 26
- (France) (Japan) Marcel Tadokoro, 28
- (Russia) Sergey Tanin, 26
- (Japan) Yuki Yoshimi, 22
- (China) Xiaolu Zang, 22

=== Quarterfinal round ===
(United States) Fort Worth, Texas - Van Cliburn Concert Hall, Texas Christian University, June 5–6, 2022

Eighteen competitors performed a 40-minute recital.

- (Spain) (Netherlands) Albert Cano Smit, 25
- (Ukraine) Dmytro Choni, 28
- (Italy) Federico Gad Crema, 23
- (Russia) Anna Geniushene, 31
- (Japan) Masaya Kamei, 20
- (Belarus) Uladzislau Khandohi, 20
- (South Korea) Honggi Kim, 30
- (United States) Andrew Li, 22
- (South Korea) Yunchan Lim, 18
- (Belarus) Denis Linnik, 26
- (United States) Kate Liu, 28
- (Japan) Ainobu Ota, 29
- (South Korea) Jinhyung Park, 26
- (South Korea) Changyong Shin, 28
- (Russia) Ilya Shmukler, 27
- (United States) Clayton Stephenson, 23
- (China) Yutong Sun, 26
- (France) (Japan) Marcel Tadokoro, 28
- (Japan) Yuki Yoshimi, 22

=== Semifinal round ===
(United States) Fort Worth, Texas - Bass Performance Hall, June 8–12, 2022

Twelve competitors in two phases:

1. a 60-minute recital
2. a Mozart concerto, selected from a list, with the Fort Worth Symphony Orchestra and conductor Nicholas McGegan
- (Ukraine) Dmytro Choni, 28
- (Russia) Anna Geniushene, 31
- (Japan) Masaya Kamei, 20
- (Belarus) Uladzislau Khandohi, 20
- (South Korea) Honggi Kim, 30
- (South Korea) Yunchan Lim, 18
- (South Korea) Jinhyung Park, 26
- (South Korea) Changyong Shin, 28
- (Russia) Ilya Shmukler, 27
- (United States) Clayton Stephenson, 23
- (China) Yutong Sun, 26
- (France) (Japan) Marcel Tadokoro, 28

=== Final round ===
(United States) Fort Worth, Texas - Bass Performance Hall, June 14–15 and 17–18, 2022

Six competitors each performed two concertos selected from two separate lists, with the Fort Worth Symphony Orchestra and conductor Marin Alsop.

- (Ukraine) Dmytro Choni, 28 Bronze
- (Russia) Anna Geniushene, 31 Silver
- (Belarus) Uladzislau Khandohi, 20
- (South Korea) Yunchan Lim, 18 Gold
- (Russia) Ilya Shmukler, 27
- (United States) Clayton Stephenson, 23
