= Fantaisie in B minor (Scriabin) =

Piano piece written by Alexander Scriabin

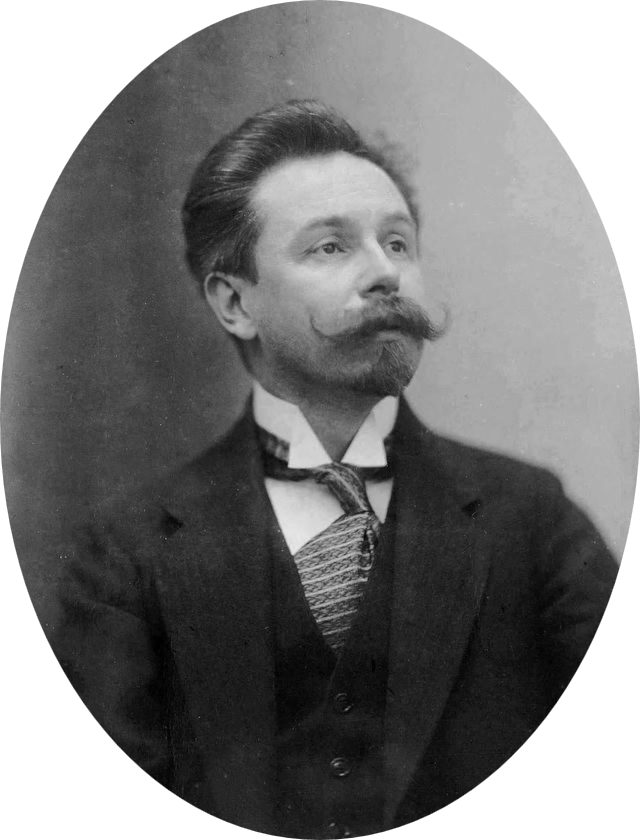
Alexander Scriabin in 1900

Alexander Scriabin's Fantaisie in B minor, Op. 28, was written in 1900. It is a single sonata form movement which bridges the gap between Scriabin's Third and Fourth Sonata. Scriabin wrote this piece during an otherwise compositionally unproductive period during his tenure at the Moscow Conservatory.

The Fantasy contains some of Scriabin's most difficult writing before his late period. The dense and contrapuntal textures are extremely difficult to voice, the collisions between the hands require careful working out, and the left-hand accompaniment is in places more or less impossible (requiring redistribution).

The first edition was published by Belaieff.

== Background ==
The piece's existence may have been forgotten by the composer. According to Leonid Sabaneyev, when Sabaneev started to play one of its themes on the piano in Scriabin's Moscow flat (now a museum), Scriabin called out from the next room "Who wrote that? It sounds familiar." – "Your 'Fantaisie'", was the reply. Scriabin said, "What 'Fantaisie'?" This story, told by Sabaneev and repeated by Faubion Bowers in his biography of Scriabin, may however be apocryphal.

At any rate, as Sabaneev saw fit to fake Scriabin's death-date and otherwise make free with facts, his recountings of otherwise uncorroborated stories are best taken with a grain of salt. Be that as it may, Bowers' extensive documentation of Scriabin's concert programs shows no evidence of Scriabin having played the piece in public.

== Music ==
MIDI recordings of performances on a Yamaha Disklavier
Jonathan Floril
2009 Minnesota International Piano-e-Competition (9:51)

Kimberly Hou
2011 Minnesota International Piano-e-Competition (7:57)

The Fantasy begins with ambiguous, open harmony not unlike that which Scriabin used for the opening of his Second Sonata, known as the Sonata-Fantasy. The opening is clearly in B minor, but the tonic is consistently avoided: a technique used extensively in Chopin's Ballades, in Wagner's Tristan und Isolde, and by Scriabin himself in his Third and Fourth Sonatas. The opening is characterized by an inexorably descending bassline and a melody that alternately struggles upwards and plunges dramatically back down in jagged gestures.

This brooding opening gives way to one of Scriabin's most beautiful melodies, a second subject in D major. The melody is treated canonically, with multiple voices echoing above an extremely widespread left-hand accompaniment. The closing groups, also in D major, are grand and confident with rhythmic obsessiveness and directional gestures characteristic of Scriabin's heroic writing.

In the recapitulation, the first subject is extensively elaborated with sweeping arpeggios in both hands. It is, however, truncated, giving way quite rapidly to a transition to the second theme. The second subject, meanwhile, is recapitulated in grandeur rather than tenderness: an apotheosis not unlike the thematic transformation of the main subject in Chopin's first ballade from its initial tender statement in E♭ major to its grand exuberance in A major.

Despite the implications of freedom and improvisation entailed in the title "Fantasy", the work is really a rather straightforward (if not formulaic) sonata-allegro. Its exposition has a clear first subject and transition, followed by a second subject and closing groups in the relative major. The development section is characteristically stormy, sequencing motives from the exposition; and except for the truncation of the first theme the recapitulation maps measure for measure onto the exposition. The "Fantasy" elements take over, however, at the end of the recapitulation: rather than settling comfortably into B major, the piece launches into a coda that is at turns free and improvisational, sequential (almost a second development), and recapitulatory. (See for comparison the fourth movement of Scriabin's Sonata No. 3, which seems to be on ambiguous formal borderline between sonata-allegro and sonata-rondo.)

Ultimately, the coda ends triumphantly in B major, with a strong evocation of Wagner's "Liebestod". At any rate, the texture at the close is very similar to that of Liszt's transcription of the Wagner; the key is the same; and in each case the major tonic is approached by the supertonic half diminished seventh chord.
