= IV Minnesota International Piano-e-Competition =

The Fourth Minnesota International Piano-e-Competition took place in Minneapolis–Saint Paul from June 29 to July 10, 2009.

== Jury ==
- Alexander Braginsky (nonvoting chairman)
- David Dubal
- Akiko Ebi
- Gabriel Kwok
- Nikolai Petrov
- Jerome Rose
- Jeremy Siepmann
- Arie Vardi

== Awards ==
Award	Winner	Notes
1st prize	Italy Alessandro Taverna	Cash award of US $25,000
2nd prize	Belarus Pavel Yeletskiy	Cash award of $15,000
3rd prize	France Hélène Tysman	Cash award of $10,000
4th prize	USA Eric Zuber	Cash award of $6,000
5th prize	USA Howard Na	Cash award of $5,000
6th prize	South Korea Grace Eun Hae Kim	Cash award of $4,000
Schubert prize	Belarus Pavel Yeletskiy	Cash award of $3,000 by The Schubert Club. Awarded to one contestant for the best performance of a Schubert Sonata. Yeletskiy performed the Schubert Piano Sonata No. 18 in G major, D. 894 (Op. 78).

== Competition results, by rounds ==
=== Preliminary round ===
February 12–15, Yamaha Artist Services Inc. (Piano Salon), New York City.

- South Korea Dae Hyung Ahn
- USA Charlie Albright
- USA Christopher Atzinger
- China Chao-yin Cai
- China Ying Cai
- China Lie Chen
- China Yunjie Chen
- New Zealand Henry Wong Doe
- Spain Leopoldo Erice
- Ukraine USA Inna Faliks
- Ecuador Spain Jonathan Floril
- Russia Elmar Gasanov
- Bulgaria Irina Georgieva
- Ukraine Pavel Gintov
- Indonesia Sutini Goh
- Turkey Ayşedeniz Gökçin
- Russia Anna Golubeva
- Russia Vyacheslav Gryaznov
- China Miao Hou
- Taiwan Shih-Wei Huang
- China Ran Jia
- Ukraine Germany Andrej Jussow
- Russia Alexander Karpeyev
- South Korea Grace Eunhae Kim
- Russia Eduard Kunz
- Hungary István Lajkó
- Canada Simon Larivière
- Taiwan Hanchien Lee
- China Shen Lu
- Russia Maria Masycheva
- Canada Scott Meek
- USA Howard Na
- South Korea Jonghwa Park
- South Korea Hye-Yeon Park
- Poland Piotr Rozanski
- Japan Yukiko Sekino
- Canada Alexander Seredenko
- USA Anna Shelest
- China Rui Shi
- Russia Mikhail Shilyaev
- USA Andrew Staupe
- Russia Konstantin Soukhovetski
- Russia Alexei Sychev
- South Korea Young-Ah Tak
- China Di-Yi Tang
- Italy Alessandro Taverna
- Russia Anastasya Terenkova
- Taiwan USA Amy Toscano
- Ukraine Konstantin Travinskyy
- France Hélène Tysman
- Belarus Dmitri Ulasiuk
- UK James Wilshire
- China Chi Xu
- China Clara Hui Yang
- Belarus Pavel Yeletskiy
- Ukraine Denis Zhdanov
- China Hao Zhu
- USA Eric Zuber
- Poland Adam Zukiewicz

=== 1st round ===
June 30-July 4, Orchestra Hall, Minneapolis.

- China Chao-yin Cai
- Russia Elmar Gasanov
- Russia Vyacheslav Gryaznov
- China Ran Jia
- Ukraine Germany Andrej Jussow
- South Korea Grace Eunhae Kim
- Russia Eduard Kunz
- Taiwan Hanchien Lee
- USA Howard Na
- Poland Piotr Rozanski
- Japan Yukiko Sekino
- Canada Alexander Seredenko
- China Rui Shi
- USA Andrew Staupe
- Russia Konstantin Soukhovetski
- South Korea Young-Ah Tak
- Italy Alessandro Taverna
- Russia Anastasya Terenkova
- France Hélène Tysman
- China Clara Hui Yang
- Belarus Pavel Yeletskiy
- China Dizhou Zhao
- Ukraine Denis Zhdanov
- USA Eric Zuber
