= Daniel Hsu =

American classical pianist

- Born: June 27, 1997 (age 29); Fremont, California
- Genres: Classical
- Occupation: Musician
- Instrument: piano
- Years active: 2005–present
- Website: danielhsupiano.com

Daniel Hsu (born June 27, 1997) is an American classical pianist. He won the bronze medal, the Beverley Taylor Smith Award for the Best Performance of a New Work, and the Steven De Groote Memorial Award for the Best Performance of Chamber Music at the Fifteenth Van Cliburn International Piano Competition.

== Early life ==
Born in Fremont, California, Hsu began studying piano at 6 with Larisa Kagan. By age 8, he was the youngest winner of the San Francisco Chopin Competition and had made his concerto debut with the Fremont Symphony Orchestra. The following year marked his recital debut at the Steinway Society of the Bay Area. At age 10, he was accepted to the Curtis Institute of Music to study with Gary Graffman and Eleanor Sokoloff. He later studied with Robert McDonald as well.

Hsu's older brother, Andrew Hsu, and older sister, Ashley Hsu, are also pianists.

== Career ==
Hsu has performed with orchestras worldwide including the Philadelphia Orchestra, Tokyo Symphony Orchestra, Grand Rapids Symphony, New Haven Symphony Orchestra, and Fort Worth Symphony. His Carnegie Hall debut was in April 2017 as part of the Concert Artists Guild Winners Series. He has given solo recitals at venues such as the Krannert Center for the Performing Arts and the Gilmore International Keyboard Festival and has toured across Japan. Hsu has been featured on the radio including WQXR's Young Artists Showcase series and The Greene Space in New York City. F Hsu has also toured the United States as a chamber musician with the Verona String Quartet.

Since winning the San Francisco Chopin Competition at 8 years old, Hsu has earned top prizes and awards including the Gilmore Young Artist Award in 2016, first prize in the 2015 Concert Artists Guild Victor Elmaleh Competition, and bronze medal at the 2015 Hamamatsu International Piano Competition.

On June 10, 2017, Hsu won the bronze medal of the Fifteenth Van Cliburn International Piano Competition in addition to the Beverley Taylor Smith Award for the Best Performance of a New Work (Toccata on "L'homme armé" by Marc-André Hamelin) and the Steven De Groote Memorial Award for the Best Performance of Chamber Music. Out of 290 applicants, the Competition selected 30 pianists to come to Fort Worth, Texas to participate in the live competition. Over the course of two and a half weeks, Hsu was required to perform a total of two and half hours of solo repertoire (divided into three recitals), one piano quintet with the Brentano String Quartet, one Mozart piano concerto with the Fort Worth Symphony Orchestra and Nicholas McGegan, and another piano concerto for the final round, which Hsu chose Tchaikovsky Piano Concerto No. 1 under the baton of Leonard Slatkin. As a result of winning the bronze medal, Hsu received $15,000 cash, 3 years of management, a live recording and recording partnership with Universal Music Group, press kits, videos, and a website. For the chamber music award he received $6,000 and for the new work award, he received $5,000.

On August 18, 2017, Decca Gold released Hsu's first solo album, ‘’Cliburn Bronze’’. The album was featured as KUSC’s Album of the Week in September 2017.

Hsu is currently the Richard A. Doran Fellow at the Curtis Institute of Music pursuing a bachelor of music in piano performance.

== Awards ==
Year	Event	Award
2017	Fifteenth Van Cliburn International Piano Competition	Bronze medal
2017	Fifteenth Van Cliburn International Piano Competition	Beverley Taylor Smith Award for the Best Performance of a New Work
2017	Fifteenth Van Cliburn International Piano Competition	Steven De Groote Memorial Award for the Best Performance of Chamber Music
2016	N/A	Gilmore Young Artist Award
2015	Concert Artists Guild Victor Elmaleh Competition	First prize
2015	Hamamatsu International Piano Competition	Bronze medal
2015	N/A	Williamson Foundation for Music grant recipient
2007	Pacific Musical Society Piano Competition	First place, James Denver Prize
2007	Menuhin-Dowling Young Artist Competition	First prize
2007	San Jose International Piano Competition (formerly International Russian Piano Competition)	First prize
2005	San Francisco Chopin Competition	First prize

== Discography ==
Year	Album	Label
2017	Cliburn Bronze 2017	Decca Gold
2016	9th Hamamatsu International Piano Competition 2015	ALM Records

== Computer programming ==
Hsu is also involved in computer programming. Among other projects, he has contributed to the app called Workflow which helps users automate tasks on several Apple devices. The app has received the 2015 Apple Design Award and was acquired by Apple in March 2017.

== See also ==
- Van Cliburn International Piano Competition
- Fifteenth Van Cliburn International Piano Competition
