= Minnesota International Piano-e-Competition =

The Minnesota International Piano-e-Competition was founded in 2002 by Alexander Braginsky in collaboration with the Yamaha Corporation. It took place every two years in Minneapolis–Saint Paul before the 2008 edition was delayed to 2009 due to the arrangement of a junior edition of the competition. The -e- refers to the competition's focus on Internet and Disklavier technologies. The e-competition is one of the biggest, most significant competitions available for young artists. Many of its past competitors have gone on to achieve significant success on the global competition/concert stage.

The last competition was held in 2021; the competition has since been discontinued.

== Prize winners ==
=== Senior competition ===
Year	1st prize	2nd prize	3rd prize	4th prize	5th prize	6th prize
2002	(United States) Mei-Ting Sun	(Canada) Victoria Korchinskaya	not awarded	(Georgia (country)) Edisher Savitski	(Russia) Tatyana Kolessova	(Taiwan) Wen-Yin Chan
2004	(China) Jie Chen	(South Korea) Yung Wook Yoo	(Russia) Denis Evstioukhine	(Russia) Tatyana Kolesova	(Belarus) Hanna Shybayeva	(Israel) Inesa Synkevych
2006	(Georgia (country)) Edisher Savitski	(Canada) Ryo Yanagitani	(Canada) Victoria Korchinskaya	(Russia) Mikhail Mordvinov	(Israel) Einav Yarden	(United States) Gregory DeTurck
2009	(Italy) Alessandro Taverna	(Belarus) Pavel Yeletskiy	(France) Hélène Tysman	(United States) Eric Zuber	(United States) Howard Na	(South Korea) Grace Eun Hae Kim
2014	(Denmark) (Sweden) Peter Friis Johansson	(Russia) Alexey Chernov	(Germany) Frank Dupree	(Spain) Marianna Prjevalskaya	(China) Chen Guang	not awarded
2018	(Hong Kong) KaJeng Wong	(Russia) Timur Mustakimov	(South Korea) Su Yeon Kim	—N/a		

=== Junior competition ===
Year	Category	1st prize	2nd prize	3rd prize	4th prize	5th prize
2008	—N/a	(Germany) Frank Düpree (China) Nansong Huang	not awarded	(Canada) Jan Lisiecki (Russia) Osip Nikiforov	not awarded	(Russia) Vladimir Levitsky
2011	—N/a	(Hong Kong) Aristo Sham	(Canada) Tristan Teo	(South Korea) Su Yeon Kim	(Canada) Annie Zhou (Japan) Misora S. Ozaki	not awarded
2013	—N/a	(United States) Eric Lu	(United States) Carmen Knoll	(United Kingdom) Yuanfan Yang	(China) JiaXin Min	(United States) Christopher Son Richardson
2015	—N/a	(United States) Nathan Lee	(United States) Elliot Wuu	(Russia) Arsenii Mun	(China) YanZhou Li	(United States) Christopher Son Richardson
2017	—N/a	(Australia) Shuan Hern Lee	(South Korea) Youl Sun	(United States) Andrew Li	(Australia) Rio Kai Rui	(China) Yongqiu Liu
2019	—N/a	(Canada) Kevin Chen	(China) Yu Lei	(Canada) Eric Guo	(United States) Solomon Ge	(United States) Caleb Borick
2021	Sparks (>10)	(United States) Taige Wang	(Thailand) Thannapas Luanpitpong	(China) Sihong Li	(United States) Isabel Feng	(United States) Masanobu Pires
2021	Aspires (>14)	(China) Yanyan Bao	(United States) Xinran Shi	(China) Jiayou Xu	(China) Xuanxiang Wu	(China) Zhiwei Chen
2021	Young Artists (>17)	(South Korea) Jinyoung Kweon	(China) Hao Rao	(China) Yuetong Wang	(Germany) Maria Eydman	(United States) Nathaniel Zhang
