= Aristo Sham =

Hong Kong pianist (born 1996)

- 沈靖韜
- Born: March 12, 1996 (age 30); British Hong Kong
- Education: Harvard University (BA); New England Conservatory of Music (MM); Juilliard School (AD)
- Occupation: Musician
- Years active: 2007–present
- Musical career
- Genre: Classical
- Instrument: Piano
- Website: aristosham.net

Chinese name
- Traditional Chinese: 沈靖韜
- Simplified Chinese: 沈靖韬
Transcriptions
Standard Mandarin
- Hanyu Pinyin: Shěn Jìngtāo

Aristo Sham (Chinese: 沈靖韜; pinyin: Shěn Jìngtāo; born 12 March 1996) is a Hong Kong pianist. He has performed as a soloist with many orchestras internationally. In 2025, he gained recognition after winning the Gold Medal at the Van Cliburn International Piano Competition.

== Early life and education ==
Born in Hong Kong, Sham began piano lessons with his mother at the age of three. His father, C.W. Sham, is a physics teacher at the cram school Beacon College. He attended Diocesan Boys' School for primary education and was a student of Eleanor Wong at the Hong Kong Academy for Performing Arts before moving to London to study at the Harrow School.

Sham first came to attention as the winner of the Ettlingen International Piano Competition in 2006, the Gina Bachauer International Junior Piano Competition in 2008, and the Minnesota International Piano-e-Competition in 2011. In 2009, he was featured in the TV series, The World’s Greatest Musical Prodigies, broadcast by Channel 4 in the UK. In 2011, he earned an FRSM in Piano Performance with distinction, and was appointed a Steinway Young Artist the following year.

After completing his secondary education, Sham enrolled in a dual-degree program at Harvard University and the New England Conservatory of Music, graduating with a Bachelor of Arts in economics and a Master of Music, respectively. At the New England Conservatory, he studied under Victor Rosenbaum. He has since graduated with an artist diploma from the Juilliard School under the guidance of Robert McDonald and Orli Shaham. His other principal teachers include Colin Stone and Julia Mustonen-Dahlkvist.

== Career ==
Since his Hong Kong Philharmonic Orchestra debut with Edo de Waart at age eleven, Sham has collaborated with the London Symphony Orchestra under Sir Simon Rattle, English Chamber Orchestra under Raymond Leppard, Orchestre de Chambre de Lausanne, Orchestre Philharmonique de Monte-Carlo, Minnesota Orchestra, Utah Symphony Orchestra, and the Milwaukee Symphony Orchestra, among others. He has also performed for royalty and dignitaries such as King Charles III, Queen Mathilde of Belgium, and former President of China, Hu Jintao.

Building on his earlier achievements, Sham received further recognition after winning the 2018 Young Concert Artists International Auditions in New York, followed by the Grand Prix at the 2023 Monte Carlo Music Masters. He is also a top prize-winner at the Gina Bachauer, Clara Haskil, Vendome Prize at Verbier Festival, New York, Viotti, Dublin, Casagrande, Viseu, and Saint-Priest International Piano Competitions.

In June 2025, Sham won the Gold Medal and Audience Award at the 17th Van Cliburn International Piano Competition in Fort Worth, Texas. The prize came with $100,000 USD, a live album, international concert tours, and three years of career management.

== Discography ==
Title	Album details
Voyage	Released: June 3, 2020; Label: KNS Classical; Format: CD, digital download, streaming

== Awards ==
- 2006: Ettlingen International Piano Competition – First Prize and Bärenreiter Urtext Special Prize
- 2008: Gina Bachauer International Junior Piano Competition – First Prize
- 2008: Hong Kong Top 10 Outstanding Teens
- 2011: Minnesota International Junior Piano-e-Competition – First Prize and Schubert Prize
- 2015: Viseu International Piano Competition – First Prize
- 2015: Wideman International Piano Competition – First Prize
- 2016: New York International Piano Competition – First Prize and Best Performance of Commissioned Work
- 2017: Vendome Prize at the Verbier Festival – Third Prize
- 2017: Clara Haskil International Piano Competition – Finalist
- 2017: Viotti International Music Competition – Second Prize
- 2017: Saint-Priest International Music Competition – Second Prize
- 2018: Dublin International Piano Competition – Fourth Prize
- 2018: Gina Bachauer International Artists Piano Competition – Second Prize and Audience Prize
- 2018: Young Concert Artists International Auditions – First Prize
- 2019: Alessandro Casagrande International Piano Competition – First Prize
- 2023: Monte Carlo Music Masters – Winner and Prince Rainier III Prize
- 2025: Van Cliburn International Piano Competition – Gold Medal and Audience Award
