= Peter Johansson =

Peter Johansson may refer to:

- Peter Johansson (figure skater) (born 1967), Swedish figure skater
- Peter Johansson (Swedish footballer) (born 1955), Swedish footballer
- Peter Johansson (Danish footballer) (born 1948)
- Peter Johansson (motorcyclist) (born 1966), Swedish Grand Prix motocross racer
- Peter Johansson (musician) (born 1977), Swedish singer, guitarist, dancer and musical artist
- Peter Friis Johansson (born 1983), Swedish classical pianist

== See also ==
- Pete Johansen (born 1962), Norwegian violinist
