= Ji Young Chae =

Korean ballet dancer

Ji Young Chae (Korean: 채지영; born 1993) is a principal dancer with the Boston Ballet.

== Biography ==
Ji Young Chae trained ballet at Seoul Arts High School and Korea National University of Arts.

Before joining a professional dance company, Chae received multiple awards. In 2020, she was awarded the gold medal at the International Ballet Competition in Jackson, Mississippi, as well in Varna, Bulgaria. The following year, she won the gold medal at the International Ballet Competition in Boston, Massachusetts.

In 2011, Chae joined the Washington Ballet and performed at the Paris Conservatory Ballet Festival, as well as the International Baltic Ballet Festival Gala.

She then joined the Boston Ballet in 2013, was promoted to soloist in 2015, then promoted to principal dancer in 2018.
