= Seventeenth Van Cliburn International Piano Competition =

American musical competition

The Seventeenth Van Cliburn International Piano Competition took place in Fort Worth, Texas, USA from May 21 to June 7, 2025 with 28 competitors from 16 countries. This edition celebrated 63 years since the competition's founding in 1962. Aristo Sham won the gold medal and audience award, becoming the first Hongkonger to win the competition. Vitaly Starikov of Russia, who competed in the previous edition, won the silver medal. American Evren Ozel won the bronze medal.

== Competition results, by rounds ==
=== Preliminary round ===
(United States) Fort Worth, Texas - Van Cliburn Concert Hall, Texas Christian University, May 21–23, 2025

Twenty-eight competitors from 16 countries, selected solely on their artistry and announced on April 9, 2025, will perform a 40-minute recital, which includes the commissioned work, Rachtime, of 4–6 minutes by Gabriela Montero. Two of the original thirty competitors withdrew due to illness.

- (Poland) Piotr Alexewicz, age 25
- (Germany) Jonas Aumiller, 26
- (Canada) Alice Burla, 28
- (China) Yangrui Cai 蔡阳睿, 24 (also 2022 competitor)
- (Italy) Elia Cecino, 23
- (China) Yanjun Chen 陈艳君, 23
- (China) Jiarui Cheng 程嘉睿, 26
- (Italy) Federico Gad Crema, 26 (also 2022 competitor)
- (China) Shangru Du 杜尚儒, 27
- (Ukraine) Roman Fediurko Роман Федюрко, 20
- (Malaysia) Magdalene Ho, 21
- (Canada) (United States) Carter Johnson, 28
- (China) Xiaofu Ju 鞠小夫, 25
- (Russia) Mikhail Kambarov Михаил Камбаров, 24
- (Georgia (country)) David Khrikuli, 24
- (Spain) Pedro López Salas, 27
- (Russia) Philipp Lynov Филипп Лынов, 26
- (United States) Jonathan Mamora, 30
- (United Kingdom) Callum McLachlan, 26
- (United States) Evren Ozel, 26
- (South Korea) Chaeyoung Park 박채영, 27
- (Turkey) ~~Korkmaz Can Sağlam~~, 25 (withdrew due to illness)
- (Hong Kong) Aristo Sham 沈靖韜, 29
- (Japan) Kotaro Shigemori 重森光太郎, 25
- (Israel) (Russia) Vitaly Starikov Виталий Стариков, 30 (also 2022 competitor)
- (Russia) ~~Anastasia Vorotnaya~~, 30 (withdrew due to illness)
- (United States) Angel Stanislav Wang, 22
- (China) Xuanxiang Wu 武暄翔, 18
- (Japan) Ryota Yamazaki 山﨑亮汰, 26
- (South Korea) Sung Ho Yoo 유성호, 28

=== Quarterfinal round ===
(United States) Fort Worth, Texas - Van Cliburn Concert Hall, Texas Christian University, May 24–25, 2025

Eighteen competitors perform a 40-minute recital. One of the competitors withdrew on-stage due to medical reasons.

- (Poland) Piotr Alexewicz, age 25
- (Germany) Jonas Aumiller, 26
- (Canada) Alice Burla, 28
- (China) Yangrui Cai 蔡阳睿, 24 (also 2022 competitor)
- (Italy) Elia Cecino, 23
- (China) Yanjun Chen 陈艳君, 23
- (China) Shangru Du 杜尚儒, 27
- (Canada) (United States) Carter Johnson, 28
- (China) ~~Xiaofu Ju 鞠小夫~~, 25 (withdrew due to medical reasons)
- (Russia) Mikhail Kambarov Михаил Камбаров, 24
- (Georgia (country)) David Khrikuli, 24
- (Russia) Philipp Lynov Филипп Лынов, 26
- (United States) Jonathan Mamora, 30
- (United States) Evren Ozel, 26
- (South Korea) Chaeyoung Park 박채영, 27
- (Hong Kong) Aristo Sham 沈靖韜, 29
- (Israel) (Russia) Vitaly Starikov Виталий Стариков, 30 (also 2022 competitor)
- (United States) Angel Stanislav Wang, 22

=== Semifinal round ===
(United States) Fort Worth, Texas - Bass Performance Hall, May 28 – June 1, 2025

Twelve competitors in two phases:

1. a 60-minute recital
2. a Mozart concerto, selected from a list of ten (Nos. 9, 15, 19, 20, 21, 22, 23, 24, 25, or 27), with the Fort Worth Symphony Orchestra conducted by Carlos Miguel Prieto
- (Poland) Piotr Alexewicz, age 25
- (Germany) Jonas Aumiller, 26
- (China) Yangrui Cai 蔡阳睿, 24 (also 2022 competitor)
- (Italy) Elia Cecino, 23
- (China) Yanjun Chen 陈艳君, 23
- (Canada) (United States) Carter Johnson, 28
- (Russia) Philipp Lynov Филипп Лынов, 26
- (United States) Evren Ozel, 26
- (South Korea) Chaeyoung Park 박채영, 27
- (Hong Kong) Aristo Sham 沈靖韜, 29
- (Israel) (Russia) Vitaly Starikov Виталий Стариков, 30 (also 2022 competitor)
- (United States) Angel Stanislav Wang, 22

=== Final round ===
(United States) Fort Worth, Texas - Bass Performance Hall, June 3–4 and 6–7, 2025

Six competitors each perform two concertos: one free choice and one selected from a list, with the Fort Worth Symphony Orchestra conducted by Marin Alsop.

- (Canada) (United States) Carter Johnson, 28
- (Russia) Philipp Lynov Филипп Лынов, 26
- (United States) Evren Ozel, 26 Bronze
- (Hong Kong) Aristo Sham 沈靖韜, 29 Gold
- (Israel) (Russia) Vitaly Starikov Виталий Стариков, 30 Silver (also 2022 competitor)
- (United States) Angel Stanislav Wang, 22
