= Kenneth Broberg =

American classical pianist (born 1993)

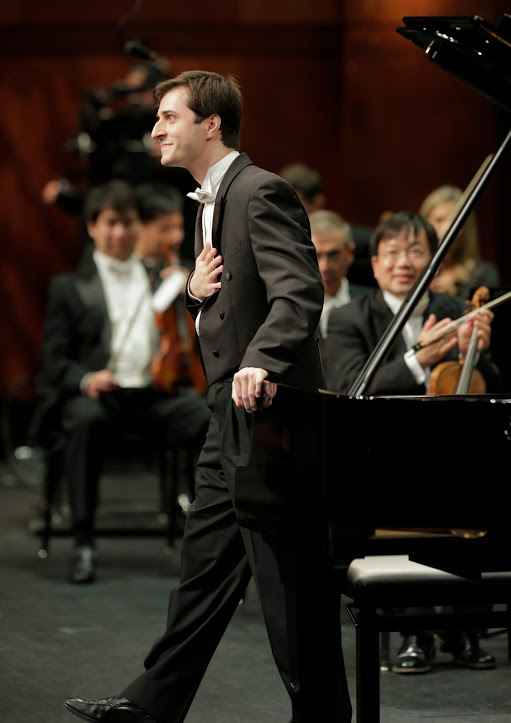
- Kenny Broberg in the semi-final round at the Fifteenth Van Cliburn International Piano Competition

Background information
- Born: August 2, 1993 (age 33); Minneapolis, Minnesota
- Genre: Classical music
- Occupation: Musician
- Instrument: Piano
- Years active: 2011–present

Kenneth (Kenny) Broberg (born August 2, 1993) is an American classical pianist. In June 2017 he won the silver medal at the Fifteenth Van Cliburn International Piano Competition. In June 2019 Broberg earned the third prize and bronze medal at The XVI International Tchaikovsky Competition. In June 2021 he won the American Piano Awards.

== Early life and musical education ==
Broberg was born and raised in Minneapolis. Interested by the upright piano in his family home that was a wedding gift to his parents from his maternal grandparents, he began playing piano at the age of 6. At 9, he began studying piano with Dr. Joseph Zins at Crocus Hill Studios in Saint Paul, Minnesota. He went on to study with Nancy Weems at the University of Houston's Moores School of Music, where he earned a Bachelor of Music degree in 2016, followed by graduate study at Park University in Parkville, Missouri, with Stanislav Ioudenitch, who was a gold medalist at the Eleventh Van Cliburn International Piano Competition in 2001.

== Professional career ==
Broberg was featured on NPR’s radio program for young musicians, From the Top, two times early in his career at the age of 16. He has since been broadcast on other radio stations across the world including ABC in Australia and KUHF in Houston, Texas.

Broberg has performed as guest soloist with orchestras around the world including the Royal Philharmonic Orchestra, Minnesota Orchestra, Seattle Symphony, Dallas Chamber Symphony, Fort Worth Symphony Orchestra, and Sydney Symphony Orchestra. He also performs solo recitals both on concert series and at festivals including the International Keyboard Odyssiad and Festival, the Rye Arts Festival in the United Kingdom, and New Orleans Keyboard Festival.

In addition to many other wins at international piano competitions, Broberg won the fourth prize at the Sydney International Piano Competition in 2016; several of his performances from that competition were included on CDs released on the Universal Music Australia label.

On June 10, 2017, Broberg gained international attention by winning the silver medal at the prestigious Fifteenth Van Cliburn International Piano Competition. Broberg had been invited to the live competition in Fort Worth, Texas, along with 29 other competitors from a pool of 290 applicants. Broberg progressed through each of the four rounds which required two 45-minute solo recitals, one 60-minute solo recital, a piano quintet with the Brentano String Quartet, and a Mozart piano concerto with the Fort Worth Symphony Orchestra and Nicholas McGegan, and he chose to end the final round by performing Rachmaninoff’s Rhapsody on a Theme of Paganini with the Fort Worth Symphony Orchestra and Leonard Slatkin. As a result of winning the silver medal, Broberg received $25,000 cash, three years of career management, a live recording, a recording partnership with Universal Music Group, press kits, videos, and a website.

As part of his Competition prizes, Decca Gold released his debut solo album on August 18, 2017, Cliburn Silver 2017, featuring a selection of Broberg’s live performances during the competition.

== Awards ==
Year	Event	Award
2021	American Piano Awards	Winner
2019	International Tchaikovsky Competition	Bronze medal (tie)
2017	Van Cliburn International Piano Competition	Silver medal
2017	Hastings International Piano Competition	Gold medal
2016	Dallas International Piano Competition	Gold medal
2016	Sydney International Piano Competition	4th place
2015	Seattle Symphony Piano Competition	2nd place
2014	New Orleans International Piano Competition	Bronze medal
2014	Wideman International Piano Competition	Silver medal
2014	Mika Hasler Young Artist Competition Foundation	1st place
2013	Young Texas Artists Competition	Silver medal
2012	New Orleans Piano Institute Concerto Auditions	1st place
2012	Moores School of Music Concerto Competition	1st place
2011	Wideman International Piano Competition	Bronze medal

== Discography ==
Year	Album	Label
2017	Cliburn Silver 2017	Decca Gold
2016	Encore!: Recorded Live at the Sydney International Piano Competition of Australia 2016	ABC Classics
2023	Sonatas By Medtner, Rachmaninov, Scriabin	Steinway & Sons
