= Seung-hee =

- Hangul: 승희
- RR: Seunghui
- MR: Sŭnghŭi

Seung-hee, also spelled Seung-hui, Seung-hi, or Sung-hi, is a Korean given name.

People with this name include:

Artists and writers

- Choi Seung-hee (1911–1969), South Korean female modern dancer
- Kim Seung-hee (born 1952), South Korean female poet
- Lee Seung-hee (artist) (born 1963), South Korean male ceramic artist
- Seung Hee Yang (born 1969), South Korean female violinist
- Nikki Seung-hee Lee (born 1970), South Korean-born American female photographer and filmmaker

Athletes

- Bae Seung-hee (born 1983), South Korean female badminton player
- Lee Seung-hee (born 1988), South Korean male footballer
- Park Seung-hi (born 1992), South Korean female short track skater

Entertainers

- Sung-Hi Lee (born 1970), South Korean-born American female nude model and actress
- C. S. Lee (born Lee Seung-hee, 1971), South Korean-born American male actor
- Cho Seung-hee (entertainer) (born 1991), South Korean female singer, member of girl groups F-ve Dolls and Dia
- Hyun Seung-hee (born 1996), South Korean female singer, member of girl group Oh My Girl

Others

- Seung-Hui Cho (1984–2007), South Korean mass murderer responsible for perpetrating the Virginia Tech shooting
- Kim Sung-hui, North Korean politician chosen for Sinpha (Constituency 642) in the 2014 North Korean parliamentary election

Fictional characters with this name include:

- Choi Seung-hee, female character in 2009 South Korean television series Iris
- Han Seung-hee, female character in 2014 South Korean television series Doctor Stranger

== See also ==
- List of Korean given names
