= Yunchan Lim =

South Korean pianist (born 2004)

Yunchan Lim 임윤찬
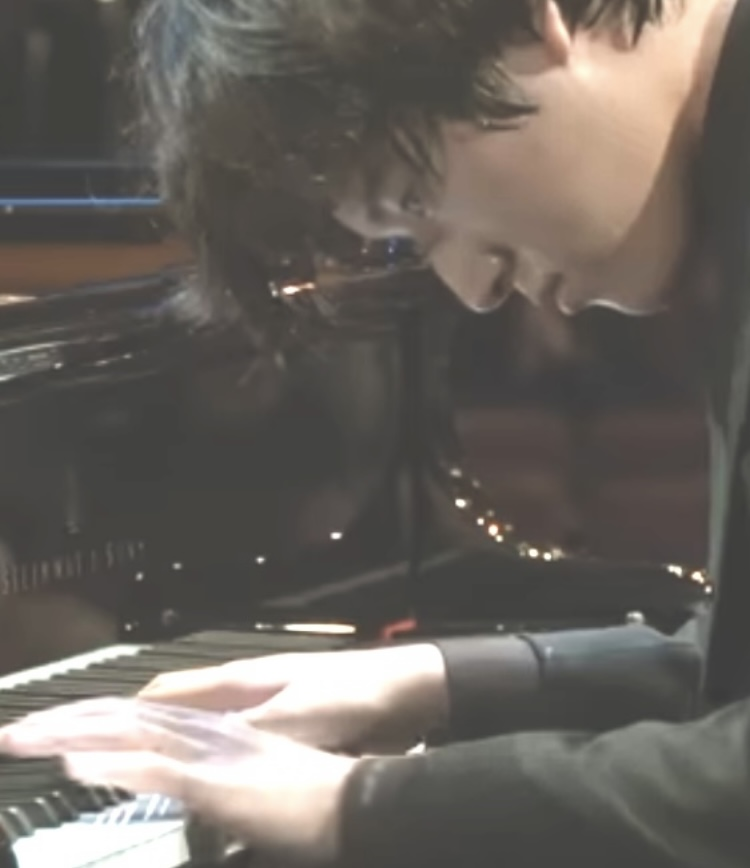

Background information
- Born: March 20, 2004 (age 22); Siheung, South Korea
- Genre: Classical
- Occupation: Musician
- Instrument: Piano
- Years active: 2022–present
- Website: yunchanlimofficial.com

Korean name
- Hangul: 임윤찬
- Hanja: 任奫燦
- RR: Im Yunchan
- MR: Im Yunch'an

Yunchan Lim (Korean: 임윤찬; born March 20, 2004) is a South Korean pianist. In 2022, he gained widespread recognition when he became the youngest person ever to win the Van Cliburn International Piano Competition at 18 years old. In 2023, he signed an exclusive contract with Decca. His first album on the label, Chopin: Études, won the Piano Award at the 2024 Gramophone Classical Music Awards.

== Early life and education ==
Lim was born in Siheung, Gyeonggi Province, South Korea. He started piano lessons at age seven and entered the Music Academy of Seoul Arts Center a year later. He began to take the piano more seriously at age nine and studied piano with Kay Kyung Eun Kim. At 13, he entered Yewon School and graduated in February 2020. Additionally, he was accepted into Korea National University of Arts, where he studied with pianist Minsoo Sohn. After winning the 2022 Van Cliburn competition, Lim transferred to the New England Conservatory of Music in Boston in September 2023, where his piano teacher Minsoo Sohn had newly joined the faculty.

== Career ==
=== 2018–2022: Early career ===
In 2018, Lim received both the Second Prize and Chopin Prize at the Cleveland International Piano Competition for Young Artists, where he performed with the Cleveland Orchestra in the final round. In the same year, he was the youngest participant in the Thomas & Evon Cooper International Competition at the Oberlin College and Conservatory, where he won the Third Prize and the Audience Prize. In 2019, he became the youngest ever winner of the Isang Yun Competition at fifteen years old.

In 2020, Lim was featured in the recording of the "2020 Young Musicians of Korea" album, which was organized by the Korean Broadcasting System and released in the same year.

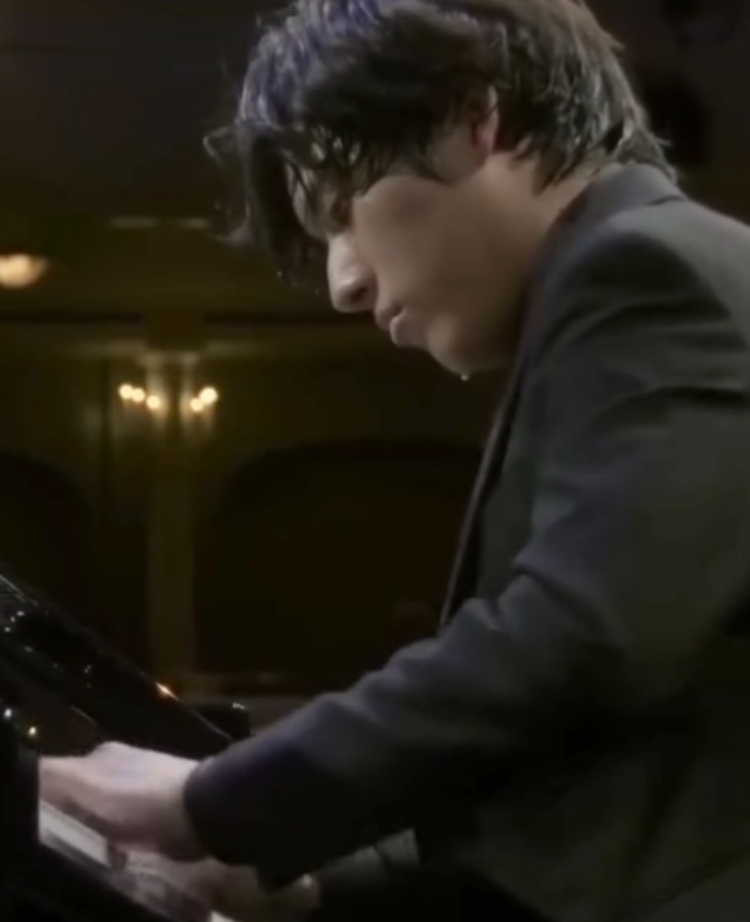

=== 2022–present: Van Cliburn Competition victory and present career ===
In June 2022, Lim won the Gold Medal at the 16th Van Cliburn International Piano Competition in Fort Worth, Texas, making him the youngest winner in the competition's history. The prize came with $100,000 USD and career management for three years. He also won two special prizes, the Audience Award and the Best Performance of a New Work. His final round performance of Rachmaninoff's Piano Concerto No. 3 is currently the most viewed video of the piece on YouTube. It peaked at #24 on YouTube's global trending list and accumulated more than 10 million views in a span of eight months.

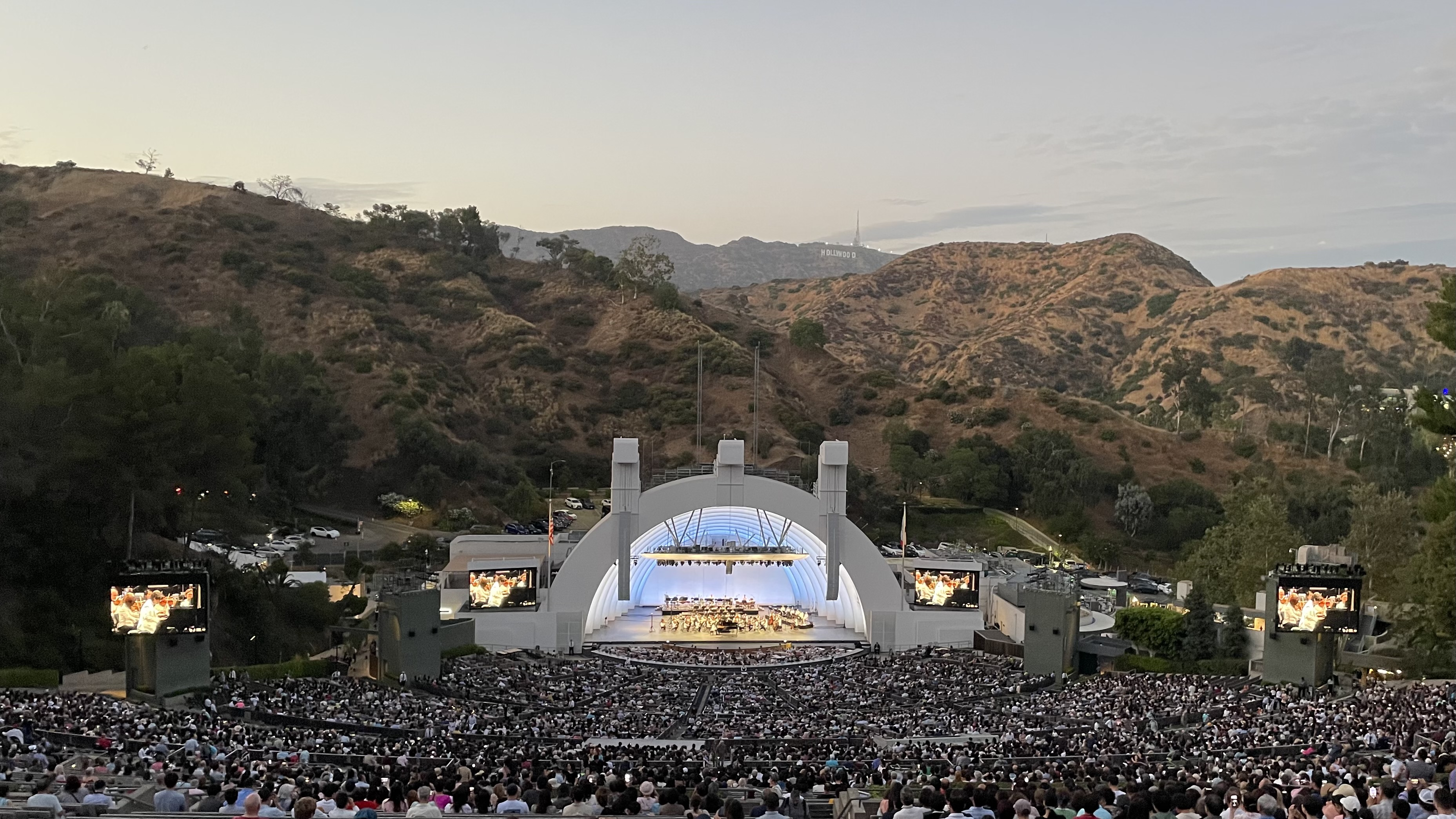
Yunchan Lim with the Los Angeles Philharmonic at the Hollywood Bowl

Following his win at the Van Cliburn competition, Lim very soon collaborated with orchestras such as the New York Philharmonic, Chicago Symphony Orchestra, London Symphony Orchestra, Los Angeles Philharmonic, Cleveland Orchestra, Boston Symphony Orchestra, Orchestre de Paris, Munich Philharmonic, Lucerne Symphony Orchestra, Tokyo Philharmonic Orchestra, Orchestra of the Music Makers and the KBS Symphony Orchestra. He participated with Sir Antonio Pappano at the 2024 Verbier Festival performing the Beethoven Emperor Concerto with the international youth orchestra. He later performed the Emperor Concerto with the Los Angeles Philharmonic with Gustavo Dudamel conducting and also with the Cleveland Orchestra.

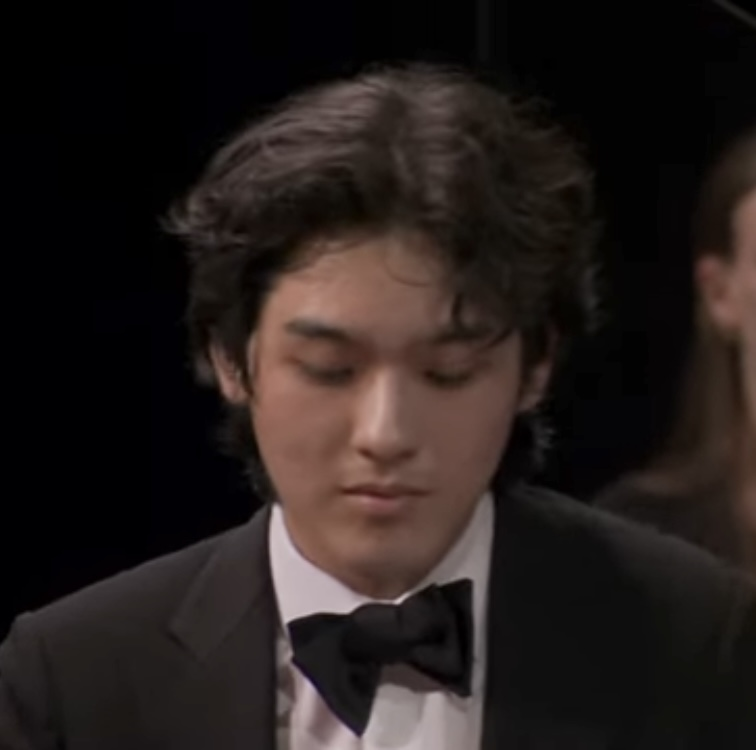

Lim has performed at Carnegie Hall, the Hollywood Bowl, Royal Albert Hall, Wigmore Hall, Victoria Concert Hall, Fondation Louis Vuitton, the Seoul Arts Center, and the National Concert Hall in Taipei, among many other venues. He has also made appearances at the Aspen Music Festival, the Bravo! Vail Music Festival, the Ravinia Festival, Gstaad Menuhin Festival, and Verbier Festival.

In 2023, Lim was included in the Forbes 30 Under 30 list under the Arts category for Asia. On July 7 of the same year, the Steinway & Sons label released an album of Lim's live performance of Liszt's Transcendental Études from the semi-final round of the Van Cliburn competition. The album debuted at number 5 on Billboard's Traditional Classical Albums chart.

In August 2023, Crescendo, a feature documentary that follows the 16th Van Cliburn International Piano Competition's proceedings and Lim's emergence, premiered at the Jecheon International Music and Film Festival.

In October 2023, Lim signed with Decca Classics on an exclusive recording contract. His first recording on the label was released on April 19, 2024.

In May 2025, Decca Classics released Lim's live performance of Rachmaninoff's Third Piano Concerto from the 2022 Van Cliburn Competition, with the Fort Worth Symphony Orchestra conducted by Marin Alsop.

On 29 August 2025, Lim performed the Piano Concerto No. 3 by Béla Bartók with the orchestra of the Teatro Petruzzelli in Bari, Italy conducted by Martijn Dendievel.

== Discography ==
List of albums, with selected details and peak chart positions
Title	Album details	Peak chart positions	Sales
Title	Album details	KOR	Sales
2020 Young Musicians of Korea Vol. 3	Released: December 2, 2020; Label: KBS; Format: CD, digital download, streaming	—	
Beethoven, Isang Yun, Barber (Live)	Released: November 28, 2022; Label: Deutsche Grammophon; Format: CD, LP, digital download, streaming	—	
Live from the Cliburn – Liszt: Transcendental Etudes	Released: July 7, 2023; Label: Steinway & Sons; Format: CD, LP, digital download, streaming	—	
Chopin: Études, Opp. 10 & 25	Released: April 19, 2024; Label: Decca Music Group; Format: CD, LP, digital download, streaming	16	KOR: 15,871
Rachmaninoff: Piano Concerto No. 3 (Live from the 2022 Cliburn Competition)	Released: May 16, 2025; Label: Decca Music Group; Format: CD, LP, digital download, streaming	29	KOR: 7,835
Tchaikovsky The Seasons, Op.37a	Released: August 22, 2025; Label: Decca Music Group; Format: CD, LP, digital download, streaming	35	KOR: 5,952
The Goldberg Variations	Released: February 6, 2026; Label: Decca Music Group; Format: CD, LP, digital download, streaming	?	?

== Awards ==
- 2018: Cleveland International Piano Competition for Young Artists – Second Prize
- 2018: Thomas & Evon Cooper International Competition – Third Prize and Audience Prize
- 2019: Isang Yun Competition – First Prize
- 2022: Van Cliburn International Piano Competition – Gold Medal, Audience Award, and Best Performance of a New Work
- 2023: Forbes 30 Under 30
- 2024: Gramophone Classical Music Awards – Best Piano Recording (Chopin Études), and Young Artist of the Year
- 2024: Diapason d'Or de l'Année – Jeune Talent (Chopin Études)
- 2025: BBC Music Magazine Awards – Recording of the Year (Chopin Études), Instrumental Award, and Newcomer Award
- 2025 Olivier Berggruen Prize, Menuhin Festival Gstaad
