= Rachel Cheung =

Hong Kong pianist

Rachel Cheung 張緯晴
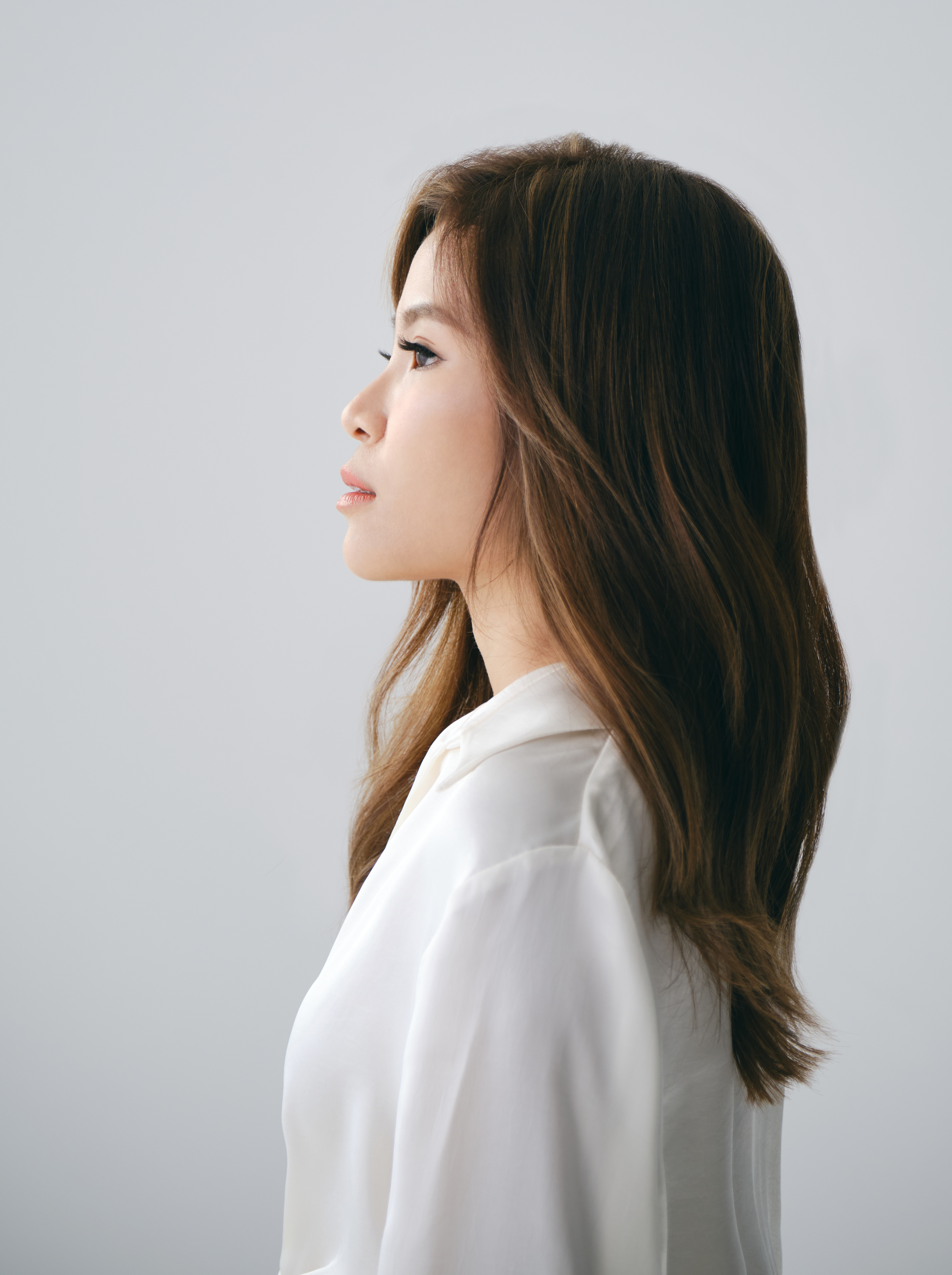
- Cheung in 2024

Background information
- Born: Cheung Wai-Ching; September 27, 1991 (age 35); British Hong Kong
- Genre: Classical
- Occupation: Pianist
- Instrument: Piano
- Years active: 2004–present
- Labels: The Alpha Omega Sound, VAI Music
- Website: rachelcheung.com

Rachel Cheung
- Traditional Chinese: 張緯晴
- Simplified Chinese: 张纬晴
Transcriptions
Standard Mandarin
- Hanyu Pinyin: Zhāng Wěiqíng
- Wade–Giles: Chang^{1} Wei^{3}-ch'ing^{2}
Yue: Cantonese
- Jyutping: Zoeng^{1} Wai^{5} Cing^{4}

Rachel Wai-Ching Cheung (Chinese: 張緯晴; Jyutping: Zoeng^{1} Wai^{5} Cing^{4}; born September 27, 1991) is a classical pianist from Hong Kong. She has won numerous prizes and awards in Hong Kong and overseas, and performs regularly in Asia, Europe, and North America.

== Early life and education ==
Cheung comes from a musical family. Her father, a piano teacher, gave her first piano lessons at age four. At age ten, she was admitted to The Hong Kong Academy for Performing Arts (HKAPA) as a junior student studying under Professor Eleanor Wong, Artist-in-Residence and Senior Lecturer in Keyboard. She also attended secondary school at the Maryknoll Convent School. For college, she continued studies at HKAPA with Professor Wong and obtained her Bachelor of Music degree in Piano Performance with First Class Honours in June 2011 on a full scholarship from the Robert H.N. Ho Family Foundation.

In September 2011, Cheung began studies overseas with Professor Peter Frankl at the Yale School of Music in the USA on full scholarships from Yale and the Hong Kong Jockey Club Music and Dance Fund Scholarship. She was awarded the Elizabeth Parisot Prize with Larry Weng for outstanding pianists at the Yale School of Music during school year 2011–2012. On May 20, 2013 Cheung was conferred the Master of Music degree in piano at Yale School of Music's 120th Commencement.

== Awards ==
=== Junior competitions ===
In 2001 Cheung won First Prize in the Hong Kong regional competition of the Steinway and Sons International Youth Piano Competition. At her first competition in Europe, she claimed First Prize at the 2002 Llangollen International Musical Eisteddfod for Western Instrumental Group under 15 in Wales. In May 2003, Cheung won First Prize in the Junior Group (under age 15) at the “5th Biennial International Competition for Young Pianists in Memory of Vladimir Horowitz” in Ukraine. Besides winning the Gold Medal, she was awarded three special prizes from the jury: Most Outstanding Concerto Performance, Best Performance of Romantic Period Pieces, and Youngest Participant of the Competition. Also in 2003, Cheung was awarded First Prize in the Piano Solo division and First Prize in the Piano Concerto under Age 18 division at the 55th Hong Kong School Music Festival. In June 2004, she won First Prize and a Peer Jury Prize for the most popular finalist at the 2004 Gina Bachauer International Junior Piano Competition in Salt Lake City, Utah.

=== Senior competitions ===
In 2008, Cheung won second prize at the Alessandro Casagrande International Piano Competition in Terni, Italy. In September 2009, she won fifth prize at the Leeds International Pianoforte Competition, the best result a Hong Kong pianist has achieved in this prestigious competition. She was also a semi-finalist at the XVI International Chopin Piano Competition in Warsaw in October 2010. In November 2012, Cheung was awarded the George Leibenson Special Prize at the 67th Geneva International Music Competition in Piano.

In 2017, Cheung was a finalist and won the Audience Award in the Fifteenth Van Cliburn International Piano Competition in Fort Worth, Texas. The Dallas Morning News called her “a poet, but also a dramatist,” displaying “the most sophisticated and compelling music-making.”

== Career ==
=== 2005 ===
On April 14, 2005, 13-year-old Cheung performed an extraordinary program to thunderous applause, cheers, and whistles at the 2005 Miami International Piano Festival at the Broward Center for the Performing Arts in Fort Lauderdale, Florida. She performed Bach's Chromatic Fantasy and Fugue in D minor, Haydn's Piano Sonata in E♭ major, Liszt's Étude in F minor, La leggierezza, Au bord d'une source (S.156, No. 2b), and Étude No. 5 in E major, La chasse, Chopin's Variations brilliantes in B♭ major, Faure's Nocturne No. 1 in E♭ minor, Barcarolle No. 4 in A♭ major, and Impromptu No. 2 in F minor, and Prokofiev's Suggestion diabolique, Op. 4, No. 4 and Piano Sonata No. 3 in A minor, Op. 28. When it was over, the audience presented Cheung with seven bouquets and a stuffed lamb.

=== 2006 ===
On December 14, 2006 Cheung played a solo recital at Hong Kong City Hall Concert Hall at The Joy of Music Festival organized by the Chopin Society of Hong Kong. Her programme included Mozart's Fantasy No. 2 in C minor, K. 396/385f and Piano Sonata No. 18 in D major, K. 576; Liszt's Bénédiction de Dieu dans la solitude and Two Concert Studies; Schubert's Three Piano Pieces, D. 946; Chopin's Four Mazurkas, Op. 24 and Ballade in F minor, Op. 52, No. 4 and Poulenc's Trois pièces, FP 48.

=== 2007 ===
On July 15, 2007, 15-year-old Cheung opened the 2007 Golandsky Institute International Piano Festival by performing works by Chopin, Copland, Mozart, and Schumann at Taplin Auditorium in Fine Hall at Princeton University, New Jersey. On September 8, 2007, 15-year-old Cheung performed Beethoven's Piano Concerto No. 3 with the Hong Kong Philharmonic Orchestra conducted by Edo de Waart at Hong Kong City Hall Concert Hall.

=== 2012 ===
On February 25, 2012 Cheung performed Johannes Brahms’s Six Pieces, Op. 118 as part of The Kennedy Center's Conservatory Project featuring Yale School of Music students on The Millennium Stage at the John F. Kennedy Center for the Performing Arts in Washington, DC. On December 3, 2012 she performed W.A. Mozart: Sonata No. 15 in F major, K. 533/494 in a piano master class with Robert D. Levin at Parker Recital Hall in Leigh Hall, Yale University.

=== 2013 ===
On September 26, 2013 Cheung performed a duo recital "A Musical Dialogue" with bassoonist Chan Ting Yuen in the Citibank Plaza lobby, Central, Hong Kong.

=== 2014 ===
On January 24, 2014 Cheung played a piano duet recital with Dr. Helen Cha at the Y.C. Cheng Lecture Theatre of the Hong Kong Baptist University in Kowloon.

=== 2015 ===
On July 10, 2015, Cheung premiered the solo piano work, aux portes des rêves (Fantasia quasi una Sonata) by the Hong Kong performer-composer, Angus Lee, at a flute duo-recital held jointly be Lee and Li Dan Wei at the Hong Kong Academy for Performing Arts. Cheung would join Lee in the latter's recital organised by the Hong Kong government's Leisure and Cultural Services Department in 2018, performing Richard Strauss's Sonata in E♭ major (Op. 18).

On October 4, 2015 Cheung made her debut at the Stars of Steinway Recital Series at Dunkley Music in Meridian, Idaho. Her season-opening concert was sponsored by Dunkley Music and Pianoconcert Idaho. She played Oiseaux tristes, Une barque sur l'ocean, and Alborada del gracioso from Ravel's Miroirs, Brahms' Four Piano Pieces, Op. 119, and Prokofiev's Piano Sonata No. 6 in A major, Op. 82. Receiving multiple standing ovations and applause, she played two encores: Chopin's Prelude Op. 28, No. 6 and Liszt's La Campanella.

=== 2023 ===
Cheung was one of the featured artists in HKU MUSE's 2023/24 season, performing in the concert 'Limitless Limitations: Ligeti 100' in celebration of the centenary of the Hungarian composer, György Ligeti. At the concert, she performed the composer's Musica ricercata (1951–53) for solo piano.

== Discography ==
	title	works	label	recording date	recording location	release date	catalog number	length	format
1.	Rachel Cheung: Keyboard Prodigy Live in Recital	Bach, Haydn, Liszt, Chopin, Fauré, Prokofiev, Copland, Field	Video Artists International (VAI)	April 14, 2005	Amaturo Theater, Broward Center for the Performing Arts, 2005 Miami International Piano Festival, Fort Lauderdale, Florida, USA (live)	May 29, 2007	VAI DVD 4427	76:00	DVD
2.	Rachel Cheung, Piano: Works by Mozart, Liszt, Schubert, Chopin and Poulenc	Mozart, Schubert, Chopin, Liszt, Poulenc	The Alpha Omega Sound (The Chopin Society of Hong Kong Limited)	2007	Hong Kong (studio), mastered at Abbey Road Studios in London	2009	AOS-07-1003-1-1000-RACHEL CHEUNG	75:17	CD
