= Alexander Braginsky =

Russian-born pianist and pedagogue

Alexander Braginsky Александр Иосифович Брагинский
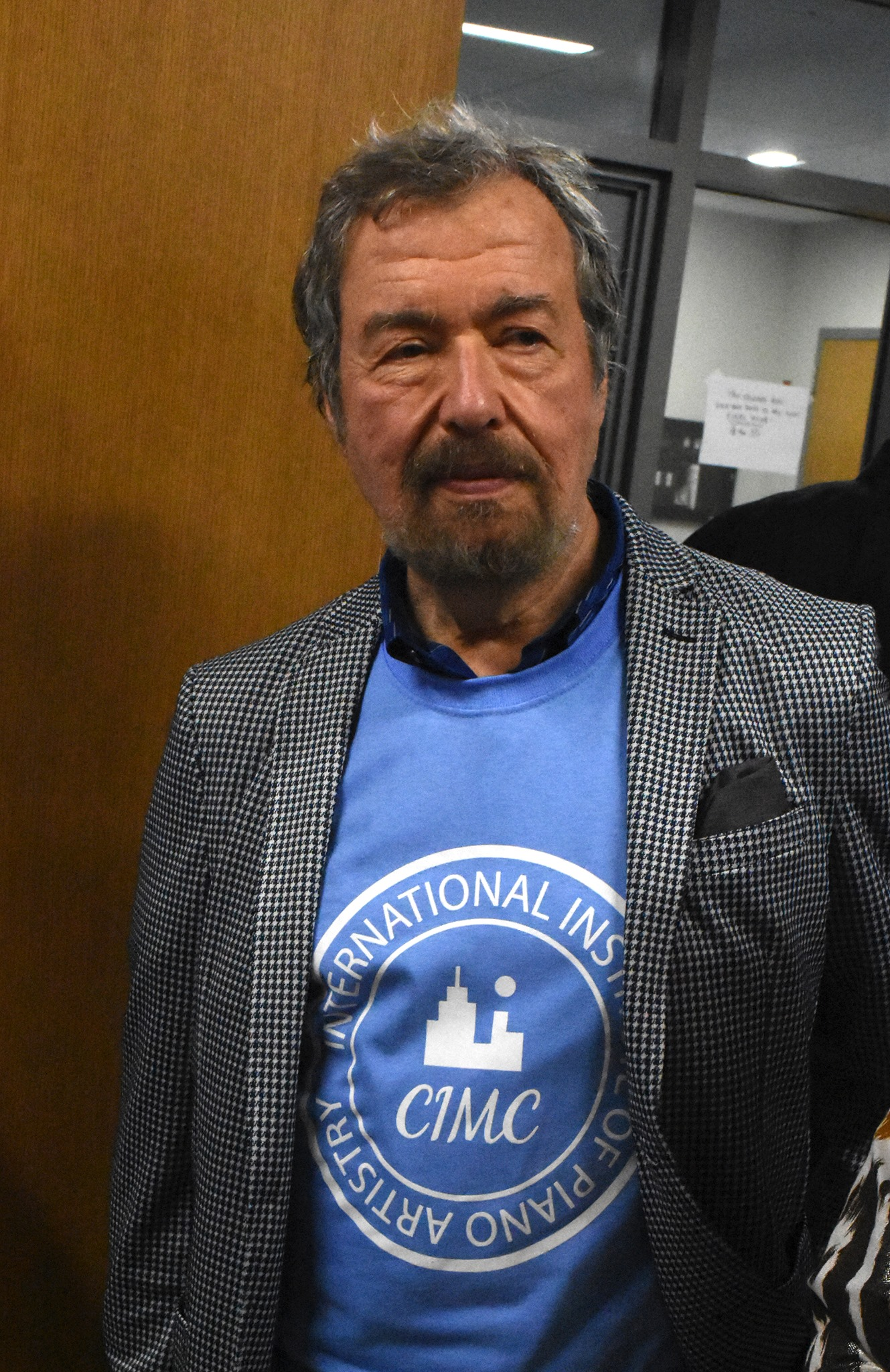
- Braginsky in 2019.

Background information
- Born: May 29, 1944 (age 82); Russia
- Occupations: Musician, teacher
- Instrument: Piano

Alexander Iosifovich Braginsky (Russian: Александр Иосифович Брагинский, Aleksandr Iosifovič Braginskij; May 29, 1944) is a Russian-born pianist and pedagogue, currently living in the United States.

== Life and career ==
He studied at the Moscow Conservatory with Aleksandr Goldenweiser, and, after Goldenweiser's death in 1961, with Theodore Gutman. In the early 1970s, he left Russia with his wife, Tatiana Remenikova, never to visit again until 2004. After first spending a couple of years in the United Kingdom he then moved to the USA.

He is on the piano faculty at the University of Minnesota, Minneapolis and at the Hamline University, St. Paul, where he works with a select group of piano students from around the world. In addition to his teaching schedule, Braginsky continues to perform, mostly as a soloist and a chamber musician (with his cellist wife). He has recorded a number of works, including Shostakovich's 24 Preludes (op.34), Piano Sonata No.2 (op.61), and Sonata for Violoncello and Piano (op.40). A number of composers had their works premiered by Braginsky, including the Minnesota-based Stephen Paulus and Libby Larsen.

Braginsky realized the possibility of combining his piano artistry with the computer technology of the late 1980s, adding a novel dimension to his performances. In 2002 Braginsky founded the Minnesota International Piano-e-Competition that occurs every two years and features the Disklavier-Pro pianos, produced by Yamaha. The competition added a junior version in 2008. The competition has attracted several top young pianists from around the world. Many of the competition's former prizewinners and contestants have gone on to achieve significant success on the international concert stage, including Mei-Ting Sun, Jan Lisiecki, Eric Lu, among others. The last edition of the competition was held in 2021, but it has since been discontinued.

Braginsky has served on the faculty and juries of prominent festivals and competitions worldwide, including at the International Keyboard Institute/Festival in New York, and the Beijing International Music Festival/Academy.

Many of his students have been prizewinners in prestigious local, national and international piano competitions. Braginsky has taught a number of notable pianists who received critical acclaim.
