= Seoul Arts High School =

Private high school in Seoul, South Korea

- 서울예술고등학교

Location
- Pyeongchangmunwha-ro 70; Jongno District, Seoul; South Korea

Information
- Type: Private, Specialist
- Motto: Liberty, Love, Peace
- Established: 1953
- Principal: Geum Nan-se (금난새)
- Gender: Co-educational
- Website: www.yego.or.kr

Korean name
- Hangul: 서울예술고등학교
- Hanja: 서울藝術高等學校
- RR: Seoul yesul godeunghakgyo
- MR: Sŏul yesul kodŭnghakkyo

Seoul Arts High School (Korean: 서울예술고등학교), also known by the Korean-language abbreviation Yego (예고), is a private arts high school located within Pyeongchang-dong, Jongno District, in Seoul, South Korea.

== History ==
Seoul Arts High School was founded on March 21, 1953 as Ewha Arts High School by the Yooha School Foundation (which was later renamed Ewha School Foundation and is the same foundation that operates Ewha Girls' High School and its other satellite schools). The name was changed later that year to reflect the school's coeducational status. Originally a government-aided school, it was granted autonomous (private) status, effective from the 2003–04 academic year.

The school held a special exhibition in 2013 to celebrate its 50th anniversary.

The incumbent principal, Geum Nan-se (금난새), was appointed in 2014 and is the school's 8th principal.

== Academics ==
Over the years, Seoul Arts High School has gained a reputation as one of the country's premier schools for both its arts programs and results in the university entrance examinations (SAT). The music department has notably sent its students to the country's top music schools, including Seoul National University's College of Music, and the internationally renowned Curtis Institute of Music and Juilliard School in the United States.

The art and dance departments are also well-known for high-achieving graduates as well.

Seoul Arts High School requires students to take mainstream subjects like their peers in regular high schools, in addition to specialist majors offered by the three departments:

- Dance
- Art
- Music

== Notable alumni ==
- Ji Young Chae, ballerina
- Cho Min-kyu, classical crossover singer and member of Forestella
- Seong-Jin Cho, classical pianist
- Dain Yoon, artist
- Myung-wha Chung, cellist
- Goo Jae-yee, actress and model
- Chi-Ho Han, pianist
- Han Soo-jin, ice hockey player
- Hong Jin-ho, cellist and member of Hoppipolla
- Sumi Hwang, soprano
- Jung Ki-yeol, musical actor known by the stage name Kai
- Kim Dae-jin, pianist and professor
- Lee Joon, singer and actor
- Shi-Yeon Sung, conductor
- Shin Seul-ki, actress
- Seung Hee Yang, violinist
- Soyoung Yoon, violinist
- Go Youn-jung, actress and model
