= Fifteenth Van Cliburn International Piano Competition =

The Fifteenth Van Cliburn International Piano Competition took place in Fort Worth, Texas, from May 25 to June 10, 2017.

== Commissioned work ==
All competitors were required to play the commissioned work in their 45-minute Preliminary Round recital. It was Toccata on "L'homme armé", a 4- to 6-minute work composed by pianist-composer jury member Marc-André Hamelin.

== Jury ==
=== Competition Jury ===
- Leonard Slatkin, jury chairman (United States)
- Arnaldo Cohen (Brazil)
- Christopher Elton (United Kingdom)
- Marc-André Hamelin (Canada)
- Joseph Kalichstein (Israel) (United States)
- Mari Kodama (Japan)
- Anne-Marie McDermott (United States)
- Alexander Toradze (United States) (Georgia (country))

=== Screening Jury ===
- Dmitri Alexeev (Russia)
- Michel Beroff (France)
- Janina Fialkowska (Poland) (Canada)
- James Parker (Canada)
- Pamela Mia Paul (United States)

== Awards ==
Winners of the top prizes:

Gold Medalist	Silver Medalist	Bronze Medalist	Audience Award
Yekwon Sunwoo	Kenneth Broberg	Daniel Hsu	Rachel Cheung

== Applicants ==
A record 290 entries from 43 countries were received for the competition. On March 7, 2017 the 30 competitors from 17 countries were announced.

== Competitors ==
- Martin James Bartlett, United Kingdom, age 20
- Sergey Belyavskiy, Russia, 23
- Alina Bercu, Romania, 27
- Kenneth Broberg, United States, 23
- Luigi Carroccia, Italy, 25
- Han Chen, Taiwan, 25
- Rachel Cheung, Hong Kong, 25
- Yury Favorin, Russia, 30
- Madoka Fukami, Japan, 28
- Mehdi Ghazi, Algeria/Canada, 28, (he withdrew from the competition)
- Caterina Grewe, Germany, 29
- Daniel Hsu, United States, 19
- Alyosha Jurinic, Croatia, 28
- Nikolay Khozyainov, Russia, 24
- Dasol Kim, South Korea, 28
- Honggi Kim, South Korea, 25
- Su Yeon Kim, South Korea, 23
- Julia Kociuban, Poland, 25
- Rachel Naomi Kudo, United States/Japan, 30
- Eun-Ae Lee, South Korea, 29
- Ilya Maximov, Russia, 30
- Sun-A Park, United States, 29
- Leonardo Pierdomenico, Italy, 24
- Philipp Scheucher, Austria, 24
- Ilya Shmukler, Russia, 22
- Yutong Sun, China, 21
- Yekwon Sunwoo, South Korea, 28
- Georgy Tchaidze, Russia, 29
- Tristan Teo, Canada, 20
- Tony Yike Yang, Canada, 18
