= Bak Solmay =

South Korean writer

Bak Solmay (Hangul 박솔뫼; born 1985) is a South Korean writer.

== Life ==
Bak Solmay was born in Gwangju, South Korea in 1985. She studied art management at Korea National University of Arts. She made her literary debut in 2008 and she won the Jaeum & Moeum New Writer's Award in 2009. She also won the Moonji Literary Award and Kim Seungok Literary Award.

== Writing ==
Bak Solmay is known for experimenting with narrative conventions, such as shifting tenses and register for no apparent reason or interrupting the flow of narration with sudden dialogue or the inner thoughts of characters.

Bak's chaotic style is related to how she perceives reality. She is a writer who "explores a hopeless generation and futureless era." Her works are a response to a society where young people cannot find jobs, are giving up their dreams of getting married, starting a family, owning a house, etc., and have no idea how to survive the so-called "Hell Joseon."

Bak voices the sense of futility felt by Korean youths today. Her characters are passive and never question their lack of agency in determining their reality. They despair over their inability to survive in this world no matter how hard they try and believe none of their actions are meaningful. This lethargy dominates Bak's works.

== Selected works ==
- 머리부터 천천히 Slowly Head First (2016)
- 도시의 시간 Time in the City (2014)
- 그럼 무얼 부르지 Then What Shall We Sing? (2014)
- 백 행을 쓰고 싶다 I Want to Write a Hundred Lines (2013)
- 을 Eul (2012)

== Awards ==
- 2014: Moonji Literary Award
- 2014: Kim Seungok Literary Award
- 2013: Munhakdongne Young Writers' Award
