= Eleanor Wong (musician) =

Hong Kong pianist

Eleanor Wong Yee-lun (Chinese: 黄懿伦) is a pianist and piano professor in Hong Kong.

== Biography ==
Wong studied at the Royal Academy of Music in London on an Associated Board Scholarship with Frederic Jackson and Max Pirani. She graduated with both the Graduate Diploma (G.R.S.M.) and Recital Diploma, the Walter Macfarren Gold medal, and Majorie Whyte Memorial Award for the most outstanding students. Later, as a Boise Scholar, she studied in Paris with Vlado Perlemuter and in New York with Artur Balsam. Winner of the silver medal at the Viotti International Competition Italy, she has given broadcasts and recitals in the UK (including the Wigmore Hall and Purcell Room in London), Hong Kong, and the U.S.

Eleanor Wong is recognised as one of Hong Kong's foremost piano teachers, with many of her pupils winning top prizes in major international and local competitions. She hosts lectures and workshops and has given master-classes in China, Poland, Singapore, Taiwan, Thailand, Uruguay and the US. Wong is a frequent juror for various international piano competitions. Wong took up the position of Artist-in-Residence (keyboard) at the Hong Kong Academy for Performing Arts in 1998, she is also a visiting professor at the Shenzhen School of Arts and Wuhan Conservatory of Music. In 2006, she received an honorary professorship from Tianjin Conservatory of Music, China. She is a Steinway Artist and the chairperson of the Piano Teachers' Association in Hong Kong.

Wong is co-director of the Hong Kong Summer Music Institution, and the Chairperson of the Piano Teachers' Association in Hong Kong.

== Notable students ==
- Rachel Cheung
- Brian Yuebing Lin
- Colleen Lee
- Aristo Sham
- Oscar Tao
- Zhang Zuo "Zee Zee"
