= Dain Yoon =

South Korean artist

Dain Yoon 윤다인
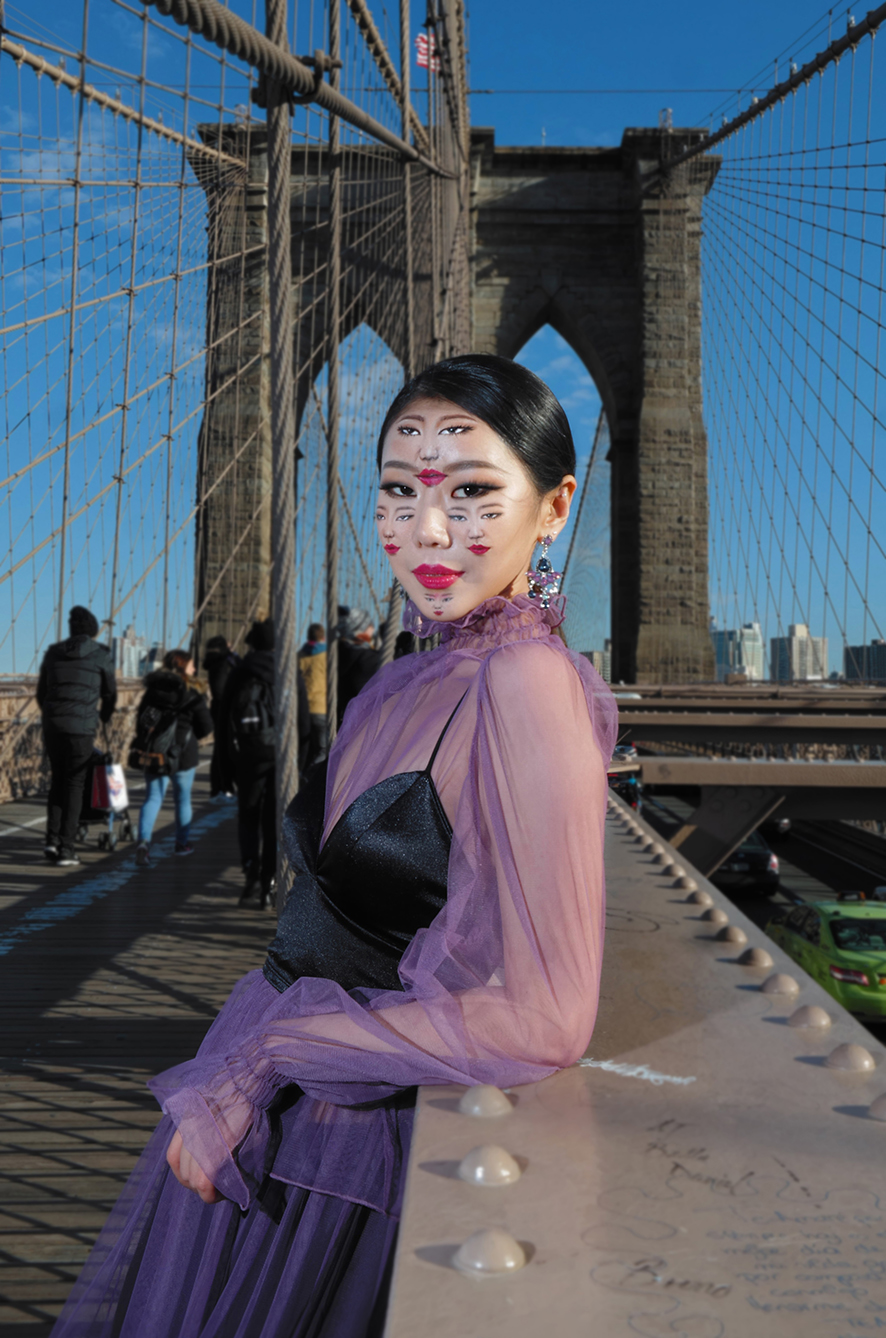
- Yoon in 2018
- Born: 2 September 1993 (age 32); Seoul, South Korea
- Education: Korea National University of Arts
- Known for: Illusion art, painting, performance art, sculpture, art photography
- Awards: 2016 Talent Award of Korea; 2017 Seoul Modern Arts Show 1st prize; 2021 Technology Creator of the Year as part of Adweek's Creator Visionary Awards.
- Website: dainyoon.com

Dain Yoon (Korean: 윤다인; born September 2, 1993) is a South Korean fine artist. She works with a variety of media and is widely acclaimed for her illusion painting on her face and body. Yoon lives in New York City.

== Early life and education ==
Yoon was born and raised in Seoul, South Korea. She attended Yewon Arts Middle School and Seoul Arts High School, graduating at the top of her class at both schools. In 2017, she graduated from Korea National University of Arts with a major in Stage Design.

== Career ==
=== Early inspiration ===
While pursuing her degree in Stage Design, Yoon often had the opportunity to design theatrical makeup and draw on the body of the actors in plays. She soon felt a strong urge to pursue her own creative work and began painting her own artwork on models' bodies and faces. Feeling restrained creatively, in 2014, Yoon started to experiment with using her own face and body as the canvas for her paintings.

Yoon chose to paint on her face because she considers the face the strongest and most sensitive part of the body. She found that these characteristics allow her to deliver delicate emotions on a canvas that is completely unique to herself, highlighting her individuality and the personal nature of her work.

Yoon first began gaining worldwide recognition for her art in 2016 when her illusion face paintings went viral on social media. Several of her early face paintings involved painting on her face and hands and overlapping both to create the illusion that they are one object. Other early works created a 'dizzying' effect in the viewer through the realistic painting of multiple eyes, noses and mouths offset from her real eyes, nose, and mouth.

=== Style ===
While primarily known for her face painting, Yoon creates work with a wide variety of mediums including canvas, sculpture, performance art and photography. Yoon's artistic style has been described as both surreal and hyperreal. She has stated that one of her intentions is to evoke strong emotions in the viewers of her work. Rather than focusing on stimulating a particular emotion, Yoon prefers her work to be capable of eliciting a wide array of responses dependent on the viewers themselves.

Yoon's artworks are also known for their all-encompassing nature where each visible object and aspect of the work is crafted to complement the work as a whole. She credits her background in scenography and stage design for her focus on the bigger picture. Yoon has stated that she seeks "to curate everything, not only the body parts being painted but also the background, the atmosphere, the movement of body, objects, lighting, every single detail."

== Collaborations ==
Yoon has participated in a wide variety of collaborative projects. She has collaborated with artists, including Maurizio Cattelan, Pierpaolo Ferrari, Halsey, and James Blake; and has worked with numerous museums and galleries including the Tate Modern, the Van Gogh Museum, and Seoul Arts Center.

Yoon has collaborated with well-known brands such as Apple, adidas Originals, Mercedes-Benz, Netflix, BMW, Pfizer, 20th Century Fox, Instagram, Chilsung Cider, Paramount Pictures, and Estée Lauder.

Yoon has garnered significant attention in media and has appeared in numerous publications including Vogue, Dazed, TOILETPAPER and The New York Times Magazine. In 2017, she was invited on The Ellen Degeneres Show to show and discuss her art piece, "hair nails" which had gone viral. In 2019, Yoon was cast as one of the two main judges of Snapchat's original show, Fake-Up, a competition-based illusion face paint show. She participated in this role for both seasons.

== Exhibitions ==
Yoon has exhibited her work at several galleries and art fairs in the United States and South Korea.

=== Solo exhibitions ===
- 2024 "I" of the Beholder, LA Art Show Featured Exhibition, California, USA
- 2019 Art Busan, Busan, South Korea
- 2018 <24>, LP Gallery, Paju, South Korea
- 2017 Performance <눈 길>, Hangaram Art Museum, Seoul Arts Center, South Korea
- 2017 Seoul Modern Arts Show, Hangaram Art Museum, Seoul Arts Center, South Korea

=== Group shows ===
- 2023 Art Busan, Busan, South Korea
- 2023 LA Art Show, California, USA
- 2020 Photo LA, California, USA
- 2019 Art Busan, Busan, South Korea
- 2019 Art Palm Springs, California, USA
