= Victor Rosenbaum =

American pianist, composer and conductor

Victor Rosenbaum (born 1941) is an American pianist, teacher, educator and administrator.

== Early life ==
Rosenbaum was born in Philadelphia, but spent most of his childhood, from age 5, in Indianapolis, Indiana. Showing an early interest in music, he began piano lessons at age 5 with Elizabeth Brock with whom he studied for eight years, later studying with Martin Marks of Butler University's Jordan College of Music. Rosenbaum also studied with Rosina Lhevinne for two summers at the Aspen Music School. His principal teacher during his college years and beyond was Leonard Shure, who himself had been a student and disciple of Artur Schnabel. Rosenbaum earned his BA degree at Brandeis University and MFA at Princeton University.

== Career as pianist ==
As a pianist, Rosenbaum has performed in the U.S., Japan, Taiwan, Russia, Israel, Brazil, and in Europe. He was a member of two trios, the Wheaton Trio and the Figaro Trio. His recitals have taken him to Chicago, Jerusalem, Tel Aviv, St. Petersburg (Russia), New York, and his long-time home, Boston, among many other places. His chamber music partners have included the Cleveland, Borromeo, and Brentano String Quartets, cellists Leonard Rose, Paul Katz, Laurence Lesser, Colin Carr, and Michael Kannen, and violinists Robert Mann, Roman Totenberg, James Buswell, Arnold Steinhardt and Eric Rosenblith. Festival appearances have included Tanglewood, Yellow Barn, Kneisel Hall, The Heifetz Institute, the International Keyboard Institute and Festival, Bowdoin International Music Festival, Puerto Rico International Piano Festival, and Tel Hai and Kfar Blum in Israel, among others. His performances have been widely praised for their communicative power. One early review said: "Rosenbaum is one of those artists who make up for all the drudgery the habitual concert goer must endure in the hopes of finding the occasional, real right thing." (Boston Globe).

== Teaching and other activities ==
Rosenbaum began teaching at the New England Conservatory in 1967 and that remained his primary musical home for 53 years until 2020. During much of his tenure at NEC he was Chair of the Piano and Chamber Music departments. He was also Visiting Professor of Piano at Eastman School of Music during the 1983–'84 academic year, and taught at Mannes College of Music in New York from 2003 to 2017. He has also held adjunct positions at Brandeis University and MIT, as well as teaching at the summer festivals mentioned above (see Pianist Career). He has also been a guest teacher at Juilliard and gives master classes worldwide at such places as the Jerusalem Music Center, the Toho School (Tokyo), St. Petersburg (Russia) Conservatory, the Moscow Conservatory, and the three main music schools of London: The Royal College of Music, The Royal Academy of Music, and The Guildhall School.

Rosenbaum was also Director (later designated President) of the Longy School of Music (later of Bard College) from 1985 to 2001. During his sixteen-year tenure as head of that school, the institution greatly expanded its educational scope and became a cultural center for the Boston/Cambridge community. The community division grew exponentially, and a master's degree program was developed for aspiring professionals. Festivals, symposia, and concert series became central to the activities of the school, as well as outreach activities into Cambridge and Boston school systems and communities.

Rosenbaum has also been intermittently active as a composer and conductor. While still in graduate school he won a national choral composition competition and his works have been performed in the US and abroad. He has guest conducted the New England Conservatory orchestra, as well as community orchestras in and around Boston. He founded and conducted The Concerto Company, a chamber orchestra whose mission was to give young artists the opportunity to perform as soloist with an orchestra.

Rosenbaum frequently gives lectures and workshops to teachers' organizations around the country. He has also recorded widely praised CDs on the Bridge Records and Fleur de Son labels. They include two discs of Beethoven's music (one of which, comprising the last three sonatas, was named one of the 10 best Classical CDs of 2005) three of Schubert, one Mozart, and a Brahms disc released in 2020.

In 2022 he was appointed Visiting Professor of Piano and Chamber Music at National Taiwan Normal University in Taipei.
