= Korea National University of Arts =

Art school in Seoul, South Korea

- 한국예술종합학교
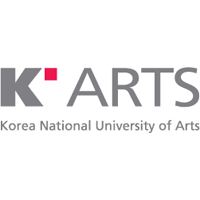
- Type: National
- Established: 1993; 33 years ago
- President: Pyeon Jangwan (편장완)
- Students: 4,071
- Location: Seoul, South Korea; 37°36′20″N 127°03′22″E
- Campus: Urban
- Website: http://www.karts.ac.kr/

Korean name
- Hangul: 한국예술종합학교
- Hanja: 韓國藝術綜合學校
- RR: Hanguk yesul jonghap hakgyo
- MR: Han'guk yesul chonghap hakkyo

Korea National University of Arts (Korean: 한국예술종합학교) is a national university in Seoul, South Korea. Korea National University of Arts was established in 1993 by the Ministry of Culture, Sports and Tourism as the only national university of arts with an aim to serve as a leading institution which cultivates artists. It has 26 departments in six schools: Schools of Music, Drama, Film, TV & Multimedia, Dance, Visual Arts, and Korean Traditional Arts.

== History ==
The Establishment Decree of Korea National University of Arts (Presidential Decree No. 13528) was passed by the State Council at a cabinet meeting on December 30, 1991 in South Korea. This decree aimed to systematically refine the exceptional artistic talents of individuals, enabling them to enhance their advanced artistic skills and become globally renowned professional artists, thereby embodying the ideals of a nation dedicated to culture. In line with this objective, the Ministry of Culture inaugurated the establishment task force on January 28, 1992, and set up provisional offices in the premises of the former National High School of Korean Traditional Music in Jangchung-dong, Seoul, South Korea. The task force, with the goal of commencing the university in March 1993, initiated preparations for the institution by enlisting a panel of esteemed experts from the cultural and arts sectors as advisory council members. The decree came into effect on January 1, 1993.

At that time when there was no higher education institution specializing in arts in South Korea, there was an initiative to establish a university in the form of a conservatory. Based on the "10-Year Plan for Cultural Development of the Republic of Korea" proposed by then-presidential candidate Roh Tae-woo during the election, the legislation was enacted with the foundation of the pledge to establish a world-class national arts university. Operating as a 4-year national institution under the Ministry of Culture, Sports and Tourism, the university officially opened on October 30, 1992, with the establishment of academic and administrative offices. In November 1992, Lee Kang-sook was appointed as the first president, and subsequently, the university began its journey with the opening of the music school in 1993, followed by other arts schools in succession. Korea National University of Arts encompasses all disciplines of arts including music, dance, theatre, film, TV, animation, fine art, design, architecture, and Korean traditional arts.

Until the establishment of Korea National University of Arts (K-Arts), art education was handled by individual colleges within comprehensive universities, and they continue to actively nurture talents. Prior to the founding of K-Arts, there was Seoul Arts College, which later changed its name to Seoul Institute of the Arts, offering an associate degree in arts education. However, it has since expanded its offerings to include Bachelor's and Master's programs as well since 2009.

K-Arts offers bachelor's and master's degree programs, along with a pre-school training program for talented young students. As of September 30, 2023, K-Arts has 2,636 students enrolled in bachelor's degree programs and 1,052 students enrolled in master's degree programs. The school also boasts 136 professors and 447 staff members.

== Academics ==
=== Programs ===
- Bachelor's Program
- Master's Program
- Artistic performance Training Programs (Prep School)
- Talented Artists Education System

=== Schools and departments ===
- School of Drama
  - Department of Acting, Department of Directing, Department of Playwriting, Department of Stage Design, Department of Theatre Studies
- School of Dance
  - Department of Dance Performance, Department of Choreography, Department of Dance Theory, Department of Art Management
- School of Music
  - Department of Vocal Music, Department of Opera, Department of Lied and Oratorio, Department of Instrumental Music, Department of Composition, Department of Musical Technology, Department of Conducting, Department of Musicology
- School of Film, TV & Multimedia
  - Department of Film Making, Department of Cinema Studies, Department of Multimedia, Department of Animation, Department of Broadcasting
- School of Visual Arts
  - Department of Fine Art, Department of Design, Department of Architecture, Department of Art Theory
- School of Korean Traditional Arts
  - Department Of Traditional Arts Theory, Department Of Traditional Music, Department Of Traditional Dance, Department of Traditional Folk Theatrics
- Interschool Division
  - Arts Management, Creation of Narratives, Musicals

== Campus ==
Korea National University of Arts is made up of three campuses in Seoul: the Seokgwan Campus, the Seocho Campus and the Daehak-ro Campus.

== Achievements ==
For the first time for an Asian musician, Sunwook Kim, won one of the world's three top piano competitions, the Leeds International Piano Competition, in June 2006. After signing a contract with Askonas Holt, he performed with London Philharmonic.

Shin Hyeonsu won the Long-Thibaud International Competition for Violin in November 2008. She also received two special awards, including the Recital and Orchestra Award.

The three top prizes at the NY International Ballet Competition were awarded to K-Arts graduates. The New York Times reported "A contest for the World, led by South Koreans". The first prize winner, Ha Eunji, joined the Finnish National Ballet as the principal dancer.

The Department of Architecture joined RIBA, the Royal Institute of British Architects. For the first time for a university in a non-English speaking region, K-Arts received international certification from RIBA.

The Korean film, The Chaser, was screened out of competition in the Cannes Film Festival, and it received the Best Script Award in the BIFF, as well as other awards from The Grand Bell Awards, The Blue Dragon Film Awards, The Baeksang Arts Awards, and others. The film's director, Na Hong-jin, the director of photography, Lee Seong-jae and the cinematographer, Lee Min-bok, are all K-Arts graduates.

The most recent achievement was Yunchan Lim winning the Van Cliburn Award in a piano competition. Subsequently, Yunchan transferred to study at the New England Conservatory of Music in Boston, Massachusetts, USA.

== Notable alumni ==
- Ahn Eun-jin
- Ang Nash
- Anupam Tripathi
- Bak Solmay
- Byun Yo-han
- Cha Seo-won
- Choi Han-bit
- Choi Sung-eun
- Choi Ye-bin
- Choo Young-woo
- Chung Su-bin
- Dain Yoon
- Han Ji-hyun
- Han Ye-ri
- Im Jae-hyuk
- Jang Dong-gun
- Jeong Jae-eun
- Jeong Phillip
- Ji Ye-eun
- Jin Kyung
- Jinsang Lee
- Jin Seon-kyu
- Jung So-min
- Jung Young-jae
- Kim Ae-ran
- Kim Dong-wook
- Kim Go-eun
- Kim Jung-hyun
- Kim Sung-cheol
- Kim Sun-wook
- Kim Tae-goon
- EunWon Lee
- Lee Chae-won
- Lee Hee-joon
- Lee Hyun-wook
- Lee Je-hoon
- Lee Jeong-beom
- Lee Joon
- Lee Sang-yi
- Lee So-yeon
- Lee Sun-kyun
- Lee Yong-woo
- Lee Yoo-young
- Lim Ji-yeon
- Moon Jeong-hee
- Na Hong-jin
- Nam Yeon-woo
- Oh Hye-soo
- Oh Man-seok
- Park Hae-joon
- Park Jeong-min
- Park Ji-soo
- Park Jong-min
- Park Ju-hyun
- Park Sae-eun
- Park So-dam
- Paula Un Mi Kim
- Seo Eun-ah
- Seo Eun-soo
- Shin Dong-ho
- Shin Hyun-bin
- Shin Hyun-su
- Stephanie Kim
- Kim Jun-myeon
- Mikyung Sung
- Wang Ji-won
- Won Ji-an
- Yang Se-jong
- Yeol Eum Son
- Yoon Hee-seok
- Yoon Park
- Yoon So-young
- Yoo Sun
- Yunchan Lim

== See also ==
- Korean art
- List of national universities in South Korea
- List of universities and colleges in South Korea
- Education in Korea
