= Konstantin Soukhovetski =

- Born: Константин Алексеевич Суховетский; January 19, 1981 (age 45)
- Genres: Classical
- Occupation: Pianist
- Instrument: Piano
- Years active: 2003? –present
- Website: Biography at Artsglobal website

Konstantin Alekseyevich Soukhovetski (born January 19, 1981) was born into a family of artists, and began playing the piano at the age of four. He studied at the Moscow Central School under the auspices of the Moscow Conservatory, where his special subjects also included composition and acting. He then studied at the Juilliard School of Music in New York City, gaining his bachelor's degree in 2003 with the Anton Rubinstein Prize as an outstanding pianist. He received his master's degree from Juilliard in 2005 with the support of The Paul & Daisy Soros Fellowships for New Americans, and is in the Artist's diploma program at Juilliard, studying with Jerome Lowenthal. He was named winner of the William Petschek Piano Debut Recital Award for 2006. His NYC debut recital was on April 20, 2006 at Alice Tully Hall at Lincoln Center.

In 2002, Soukhovetski won Second Prize in the Walter W. Naumburg Piano Competition and Second Prize in the Hilton Head International Competition. This was followed in 2003 with success in Juilliard's Gina Bachauer Competition and the Cleveland International Piano Competition, and in 2004 he won Second Prize in the UNISA International Piano Competition in Pretoria, South Africa.

Before moving to the United States, Soukhovetski performed extensively in Western Europe and Russia. During 1998 and 1999, he toured and performed with the Russian violinist Vladimir Spivakov in France, Romania, Latvia, Lithuania, Estonia, and North America. He also performed at the Colmar Festival in France.

Soukhovetski has performed with the Cleveland Orchestra, the Pretoria Symphony (South Africa), and the Austin Symphony (Minnesota). He gave his Weill Recital Hall, Carnegie Hall debut in 2003, and played for Prince Raed and Princess Maida in Amman, Jordan and Beirut, Lebanon. He has also performed at Alice Tully Hall, Lincoln Center, Severance Hall, Jordan Hall in Boston, and the Bolshoi Hall of the Moscow Conservatory. In May 2002, Soukhovetski was featured in a live performance on NPR's Performance Today, and in October 2003, he appeared on WQXR's Young Artists Showcase, hosted by Bob Sherman, live from the Juilliard School. In September 2005, Soukhovetski completed a four-week tour in South Africa (solo recitals and concerti with major orchestras) and had a recital at the Louvre Museum in Paris on March 2, 2006.
