= Chi-Ho Han =

South Korean pianist

Chi Ho Han
- Born: 19 January 1992 (age 34)
- Occupation: Pianist

Korean name
- Hangul: 한지호
- RR: Han Jiho
- MR: Han Chiho

Chi Ho Han (Korean: 한지호; born 19 January 1992) is a South Korean pianist.

He has won the 10th Seoul International Music Competition, 2nd Prize in ARD international music competition in Munich (with no 1st prize awarded) and Silver Medal (2nd Prize) in Gina Bachauer international piano competition in 2014, as well as 1st Prize and Audience Prize in the 11th Kissinger Klavierolymp in Germany (2013), Géza Anda Prize in the 12th Concours Géza Anda in Zurich (2012), 2nd Prize and Audience Prize in the International Telekom Beethoven Piano Competition in Bonn (2011), 2nd Prize and Special Prize in the Schubert International Piano Competition in Dortmund (2011), 3rd Prize in the Beethoven International Piano Competition in Vienna (2009), 4th prize in Queen Elizabeth Competition in 2016.

He has performed in Vienna (Musikverein), Munich (Herkulessaal), Zürich (Tonhalle), Dortmund (Klavier-Festival Ruhr), Beijing (Forbidden City Concerto Hall), Seoul, St Petersburg, and Tokyo and has played with orchestras such as the Radio-Symphonieorchester Wien, the Symphonieorchester des Bayerischen Rundfunks, the Münchener Kammerorchester, the St Petersburg Symphony Orchestra, and a number of other orchestras in Germany, France, Korea and the United States.

== Personal life ==
He studied in Seoul Arts High School with Jiae Kim and with Prof. Kyung Seun Pee, and then he went to Germany and studied at the Folkwang University of the Arts in Essen with Prof. Arnulf von Arnim. He is now studying under Arie Vardi at the Hochschule für Musik, Theater und Medien in Hanover and at the international Piano Academy Lake Como.

== Awards ==
- 2009 – Beethoven International Piano Competition in Vienna - 3rd Prize
- 2011 – Schubert International Piano Competition in Dortmund - 2nd Prize and Special Prize
- 2011 – International Telekom Beethoven Piano Competition in Bonn- 2nd Prize and Audience Prize
- 2012 – 12th Concours Géza Anda in Zurich - Géza Anda Prize
- 2013 – 11th Kissinger Klavierolymp in Germany - 1st Prize and Audience Prize
- 2014 – 10th Seoul International Music Competition - 1st Prize
- 2014 – ARD International Music Competition in Munich - 2nd Prize (1st prize not awarded)
- 2016 – Queen Elisabeth Competition - 4th Prize
