= Peter Friis Johansson =

Swedish classical pianist (born 1983)

Peter Friis Johansson (born 1983) is a Swedish classical pianist who also holds citizenship of Denmark. He won first prize in the Alaska International Piano-e-Competition in 2014.
