= Marin Alsop =

American conductor (born 1956)

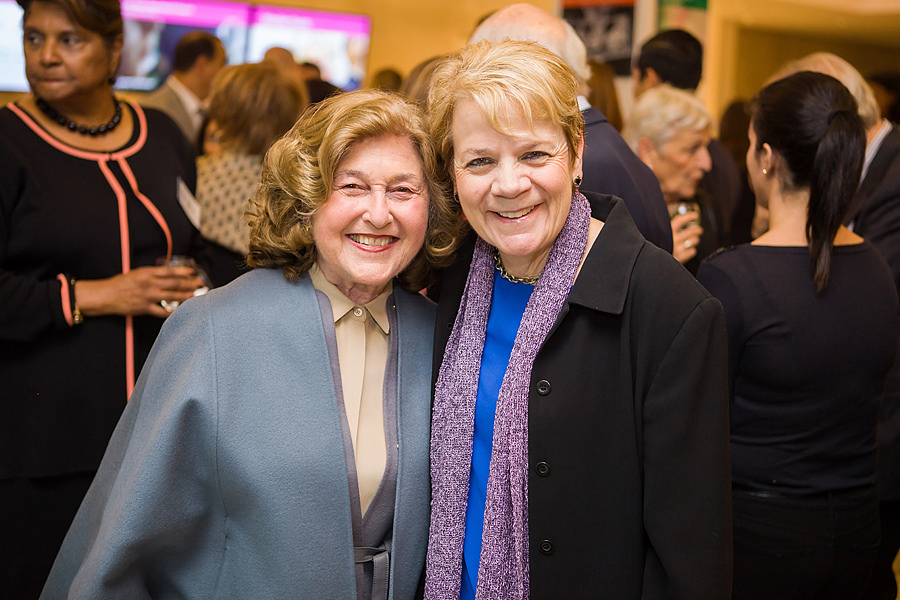
- Alsop, on the right, at a charity function in Baltimore in 2016

Background information
- Born: October 16, 1956 (age 70); New York City, New York, U.S.
- Genre: Classical
- Occupation: Conductor
- Instrument: Violin
- Member of: Polish National Radio Symphony Orchestra
- Formerly of: Baltimore Symphony Orchestra; Eugene Symphony; Colorado Symphony; Orquestra Sinfônica do Estado de São Paulo; Bournemouth Symphony Orchestra; Vienna Radio Symphony Orchestra

Marin Alsop (/ˈmærɪn ˈɔːlsəp/; born October 16, 1956) is an American conductor. She is the first woman to win the Koussevitzky Prize for conducting and the first conductor to be awarded a MacArthur Fellowship. She is music director laureate of the Baltimore Symphony Orchestra, and chief conductor of the Polish National Radio Symphony Orchestra. She was elected a Fellow of the American Academy of Arts and Sciences in 2008 and to the American Philosophical Society in 2020.

== Early life and education ==
Alsop was born in New York City to Ruth E. (née Condell) and Keith Lamar Alsop, both professional string players, and grew up on the Upper West Side of Manhattan. She was educated at the Masters School and studied violin at the Juilliard School's Pre-College Division, graduating in 1972. She attended Yale University as a mathematics major, but transferred to Juilliard, where she earned a Bachelor of Music (1977) and a Master of Music (1978) in violin. While at Juilliard, Alsop played with orchestras such as the New York Philharmonic and the New York City Ballet. Alsop was the commencement speaker at Juilliard's 116th Commencement Ceremony on June 18, 2021, in Damrosch Park, where she was awarded an Honorary Doctor of Music.

== Career ==
=== Early career ===
After failing three times to win admission to Juilliard's conducting program, Alsop founded the New York String Ensemble in 1981, the female jazz ensemble String Fever, and in 1984 Concordia, a 50-piece orchestra specializing in twentieth-century American music. In 1983 she was concertmaster in a recording session of Philip Glass's chamber opera The Photographer. In 1985, she played violin on the original Broadway cast recording of the musical Big River. She won the Koussevitzky Prize as outstanding student conductor at the Tanglewood Music Center in 1989, where she met her hero and future mentor Leonard Bernstein. She was the first woman to win the prize. In 2005, Alsop was awarded a MacArthur Fellowship, commonly known as the "Genius Grant," in recognition of her contributions to orchestral leadership and contemporary classical music.

=== Cabrillo Festival, Colorado Symphony ===
Alsop was music director of the Cabrillo Festival of Contemporary Music from 1992 to 2016. From 1993 to 2005, she was first principal conductor and then music director of the Colorado Symphony; she was then named the orchestra's conductor laureate. Alsop also served as associate conductor of the Richmond Symphony in Richmond, Virginia, from 1988 to 1990, music director of the Eugene Symphony in Eugene, Oregon from 1989 to 1996, music director of the Long Island Philharmonic from 1990, music director of the Oregon Festival of American Music from 1992 to 1996, and Creative Conductor Chair for the St. Louis Symphony from 1994 to 1996. In 2002, she co-founded the Taki Concordia Conducting Fellowship, now the Taki Alsop Conducting Fellowship, for female conductors. On September 20, 2005, Alsop became the first conductor ever to receive a MacArthur Fellowship.

=== Baltimore Symphony Orchestra ===
In September 2005, Alsop was appointed the 12th music director of the Baltimore Symphony Orchestra, having been named music director designate for the 2006–2007 concert season. She was the first woman appointed to lead a major American orchestra. The appointment generated some controversy among orchestra members, who felt they had not been sufficiently consulted. Alsop successfully addressed their concerns. In June 2009, the orchestra announced the extension of her contract for another five years, through August 2015.

In July 2013, the BSO announced a further extension of her contract as music director through the 2020–2021 season. In February 2020, the orchestra announced that Alsop would conclude her music directorship of the orchestra at the close of the 2020–2021 season and take the title of music director laureate. She conducted a series of three farewell concerts in summer 2021.

Alsop's initiatives with the BSO have included the Webumentary Film Series, a free iTunes podcast titled Clueless About Classical, and the OrchKids program, directed at underprivileged Baltimore children. In August 2015, Alsop was appointed director of graduate conducting at the Peabody Institute of the Johns Hopkins University, succeeding one of her mentors, Gustav Meier.

=== Additional US career ===
In 2020, the Ravinia Festival announced the appointment of Alsop as its inaugural chief conductor. In February 2022, the Ravinia Festival announced the extension of Alsop's contract through 2025. Alsop concluded her Ravinia tenure in 2026. In January 2024, The Philadelphia Orchestra announced the appointment of Alsop as its next principal guest conductor, effective with the 2024–2025 season, with an initial contract of 3 seasons.

Alsop conducted the Fort Worth Symphony Orchestra in the final round of the Van Cliburn International Piano Competition in 2022 and 2025.

=== Outside the US ===
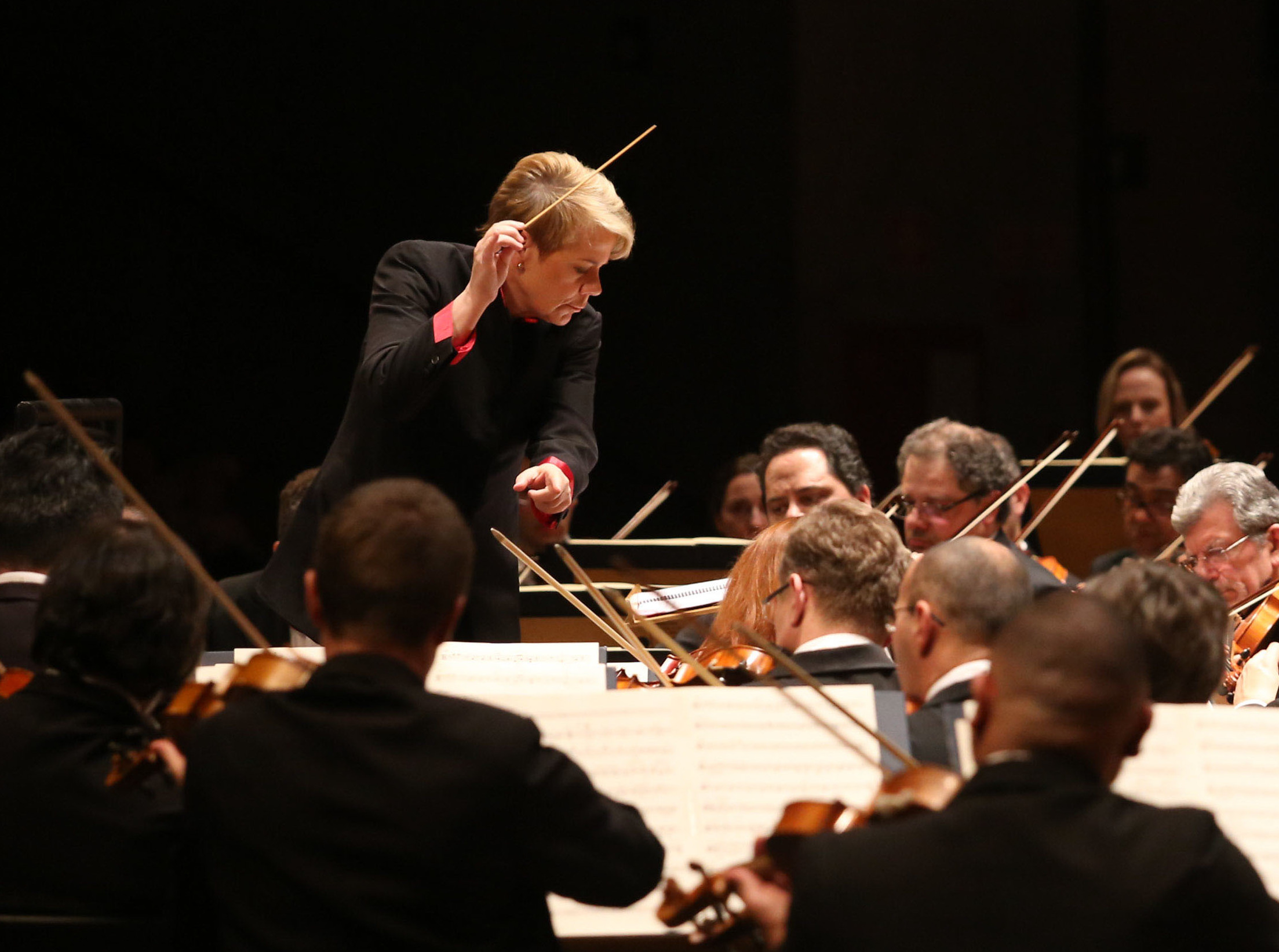
Alsop with OSESP

In the UK, Alsop has served as principal guest conductor with the Royal Scottish National Orchestra and with the City of London Sinfonia. She was principal conductor of the Bournemouth Symphony Orchestra from 2002 to 2008, the first female principal conductor in the orchestra's history. She was voted Gramophone magazine's Artist of the Year in 2003 and won the Royal Philharmonic Society's conductor's award in the same season.

In April 2007, Alsop was one of eight conductors of British orchestras to endorse the 10-year classical music outreach manifesto "Building on Excellence: Orchestras for the 21st Century" that called for increasing the presence of classical music in the UK, including giving all British schoolchildren free entry to a classical music concert. Alsop received an honorary degree of Doctor of Music from Bournemouth University on November 7, 2007. Alsop served as an artist-in-residence at the Southbank Centre, London, for the 2011–2012 season.

In 2012, Alsop became principal conductor of the São Paulo State Symphony Orchestra (OSESP), the first female principal conductor of OSESP. In July 2013, OSESP granted her the title of music director and in April 2015 extended her contract to the end of 2019. Alsop led the orchestra on a European tour, including its first appearance at the Proms in August 2012, the first Proms appearance by any Brazilian orchestra. They returned to Europe in October 2013, with concerts in Berlin, London, Paris, Salzburg and Vienna and to the Proms in August 2016. Alsop concluded her OSESP tenure in December 2019 and subsequently took the title of honorary conductor with the orchestra.

In 2010, 2013, 2015 and 2016, Alsop conducted the Belgian National Orchestra at the Queen Elisabeth Competition. On 7 September 2013, Alsop became the first female conductor of the Last Night of The Proms, and returned to conduct the Last Night on 12 September 2015. On 4 September 2014, at the Proms, she was awarded honorary membership of the Royal Philharmonic Society. Alsop returned to conduct the Last Night of the Proms in 2023.

In 2014, Alsop first guest-conducted the Vienna Radio Symphony Orchestra (RSO Wien). In September 2019, she became chief conductor of the RSO Wien, the first female chief conductor in the orchestra's history. Alsop was a recipient of one of the 25th Annual Crystal Awards for 2019 at the World Economic Forum Annual Meeting in Davos, Switzerland. Since 2020, she has been artist in residence at the University of Music and Performing Arts Vienna. Alsop concluded her RSO Wien tenure at the close of the 2024–2025 season, after which the orchestra named her its Ehrendirigentin (honorary conductor).

In June 2023, the Polish National Radio Symphony Orchestra announced the appointment of Alsop as its next artistic director and chief conductor, the first female conductor named to the posts, effective with the 2023–2024 season. In April 2023, the Philharmonia Orchestra appointed Alsop as its next principal guest conductor, effective with the 2023–2024 season, with a contract for three seasons.

== Mentorships ==
In 2002, in collaboration with Tomio Taki, Alsop created the Taki Concordia Conducting Fellowship, to provide coaching, mentorship, and financial support to female conductors. In 2019, the fellowship was renamed in honor of the organization's founder and president, the Taki Alsop Conducting Fellowship (TACF). The TACF is two-year program, that provides coaching and mentoring with Alsop and others in the profession and pays an honorarium to participants.

In 2022, Alsop created the Breaking Barriers festival at Ravinia, dedicated to "smashing the glass ceiling" for women in fields where they are underrepresented. In its first year, the festival focused on conductors. In 2023, it focused on composers. In 2024, it shifted to the study and exploration of outer space and in 2025 to female chefs. The theme for 2026 was women who write musical scores for films, television, and video games.

== Personal life ==
Since 1990, Kristin Jurkscheit, a horn player, has been Alsop's partner; they have a son. While Alsop was conducting the Colorado Symphony, of which her partner was a member, their relationship provoked controversy; Alsop responded that the relationship predated her appointment to lead the orchestra and had no bearing on her job performance.

== Discography ==
Alsop conducted her first recording in 2000 with the Royal Scottish National Orchestra in a selection of works by Samuel Barber, which was released as part of the American Classics Series on Naxos Records. This disc was followed by four more released between 2001 and 2004 dedicated to the works of Samuel Barber. In 2003, she released her first disc of Leonardo, recorded with the Bournemouth SO and Chorus. Following this, in 2005, Alsop's fully staged production of Bernstein's Candide with the New York Philharmonic Orchestra was nominated for an Emmy Award (DVD: PBS Great Performances/Image Entertainment).

In June 2006, Alsop conducted the BSO and violinist Joshua Bell in John Corigliano's violin concerto The Red Violin, recorded by Sony Classics and released in September 2007. She and the BSO made their first-ever live recording release for iTunes of Igor Stravinsky’s The Rite of Spring. Following her advent to the Baltimore post, one of her first projects as music director was a series of recordings of Dvořák for Naxos. The first disc in the series, featuring Symphony No. 9, From the New World, and Symphonic Variations, was released in February 2008, and was nominated for BBC Music Magazine’s 2008 Album of the Year.

Other recordings by Alsop with Naxos include a Johannes Brahms symphony cycle with the London Philharmonic Orchestra (the first commercially recorded Brahms symphony cycle by a female conductor), and a continuing series of Bournemouth SO recordings, which include Bartók's The Miraculous Mandarin, Bernstein's Chichester Psalms and the symphonies of Kurt Weill.

In 2009, Alsop released a recording of Leonard Bernstein's Mass with the BSO that earned a Grammy nomination for Best Classical Album. In 2010, her recording of Jennifer Higdon’s Percussion Concerto with the London Philharmonic Orchestra and soloist Colin Currie won a Grammy Award for Best Classical Contemporary Composition.

Other releases by Alsop include Dvořák symphonies No. 7 & No. 8 with the BSO, Nixon in China, and works by Roy Harris, Aaron Copland, and Barber, all on the Naxos label. In 2012, Alsop and the BSO released a recording of Gustav Mahler's Symphony No. 1, also on Naxos.

Yunchan Lim's recording of Rachmaninoff's 3rd Concerto for Piano and Orchestra made during the Van Cliburn International Piano Competition, conducted by Alsop, was released by Decca Records on May 16, 2025.

== Honors and achievements ==
=== Grammy Awards ===
Year	Category	Nominated work	Result	Ref.
2003	Best Instrumental Soloist(s) Performance (with orchestra)	Barber: Violin Concerto, Op. 14, A Scene From Shelley, etc.	Nominated	
2005	Best Spoken Word Album for Children	The Story of Classical Music	Nominated	
2008	Best Instrumental Soloist(s) Performance (with orchestra)	Daugherty: UFO	Nominated	
2010	Best Classical Album	Bernstein: Mass	Nominated	
2024	Best Orchestral Performance	Adams: City Noir, Fearful Symmetries & Lola Montez Does the Spider Dance	Nominated	

=== Emmy Awards ===
Year	Category	Nominated work	Result	Ref.
2005	Outstanding Special Class Program	Leonard Bernstein's "Candide" in Concert (Great Performances)	Nominated	

=== Other awards ===
Year	Award	Ref.
2010	Induction, American Classical Music Hall of Fame	

Cultural offices
Preceded by Philippe Entremont	Music Director, Colorado Symphony (Denver Symphony); 1993–2005	Succeeded by Jeffrey Kahane
Preceded by Yakov Kreizberg	Principal Conductor, Bournemouth Symphony Orchestra; 2002–2008	Succeeded by Kirill Karabits
Preceded by Yan Pascal Tortelier	Principal Conductor, São Paulo State Symphony Orchestra; 2012–2019	Succeeded by Thierry Fischer
Preceded by Cornelius Meister	Chief Conductor, Vienna Radio Symphony Orchestra; 2019–2025	Succeeded by Markus Poschner
Preceded by Lawrence Foster	Chief Conductor, Polish National Radio Symphony Orchestra; 2023-present	Succeeded by incumbent
