= Seung Hee Yang =

South Korean violinist and academic (born 1969)

- Occupations: Professor, violinist

Korean name
- Hangul: 양승희
- Hanja: 梁丞希
- RR: Yang Seunghui
- MR: Yang Sŭnghŭi

Seung Hee Yang (Korean: 양승희; born November 17, 1969) is a South Korean violinist and academic. She is a violin professor at Chugye University for the Arts and has performed internationally.

Born in Seoul, South Korea, she initially learned to play the piano before taking up the violin at the age of 6. She graduated from the Yewon Art School, Seoul Arts High School, and achieved the Bachelor of Music at the Seoul National University studying with Jong-sook Lee. She studied at the Salzburg Mozarteum for the Master of Music with Ruggiero Ricci in 1995, at Amsterdam Conservatory for the professional Performance certificate with Victor Liberman in 1998 and at Rutgers University for the Doctor of Musical Arts with Arnold Steinhardt in 2002.

== Awards ==
- Winner of the 30th Dong-A music competition (1990, South Korea)
- Winner of Rutgers University concerto competition
- Winner of Artists International annual New York debut audition (2000, USA)

== Career ==
Performance

- Orchestral: CIS Collegium Musicum Salzburg, Rutgers University Orchestra, KBS Symphony Orchestra, Bucheon Philharmonic Orchestra, Korean Chamber Orchestra, Wonju Philharmonic Orchestra, Seoul Classical Players, Seoul City Chamber Orchestra, Seoul Music Academy Orchestra, Collegium Musicum of Seoul National University
- Solo performances and chamber performances at music festivals and conferences: Holland Music Session, Gradus Music Festival in Spain, Bowdoin Music Festival in U.S.A, National Conference of Music of College Music Society in Canada, Carl Flesch Academy in Germany, Atlantic music festival in U.S.A, Krumlov Festival in Czech Republic

Orchestra leadership

- 2005-2011 Associate concertmaster of Bucheon Philharmonic Orchestra
- 2014–present Concertmaster of Seoul Academy Ensemble

Teaching and research

- 1994 Ruggiero Ricci's research assistant at the Salzburg Summer Academy
- 1998 Research assistant at Rutgers University
- 2000-2001 Factulty of Rutgers Community Music Program
- 2003-2005 Assistant professor at State University of New York at Oswego
- 2011 An adjunct professor at Ewha Womans University
- 2012-2022 Artist/Professor at Atlantic Music Festival
- 2012–present Professor at Chugye University for the Arts
