= Anne-Marie McDermott =

American pianist

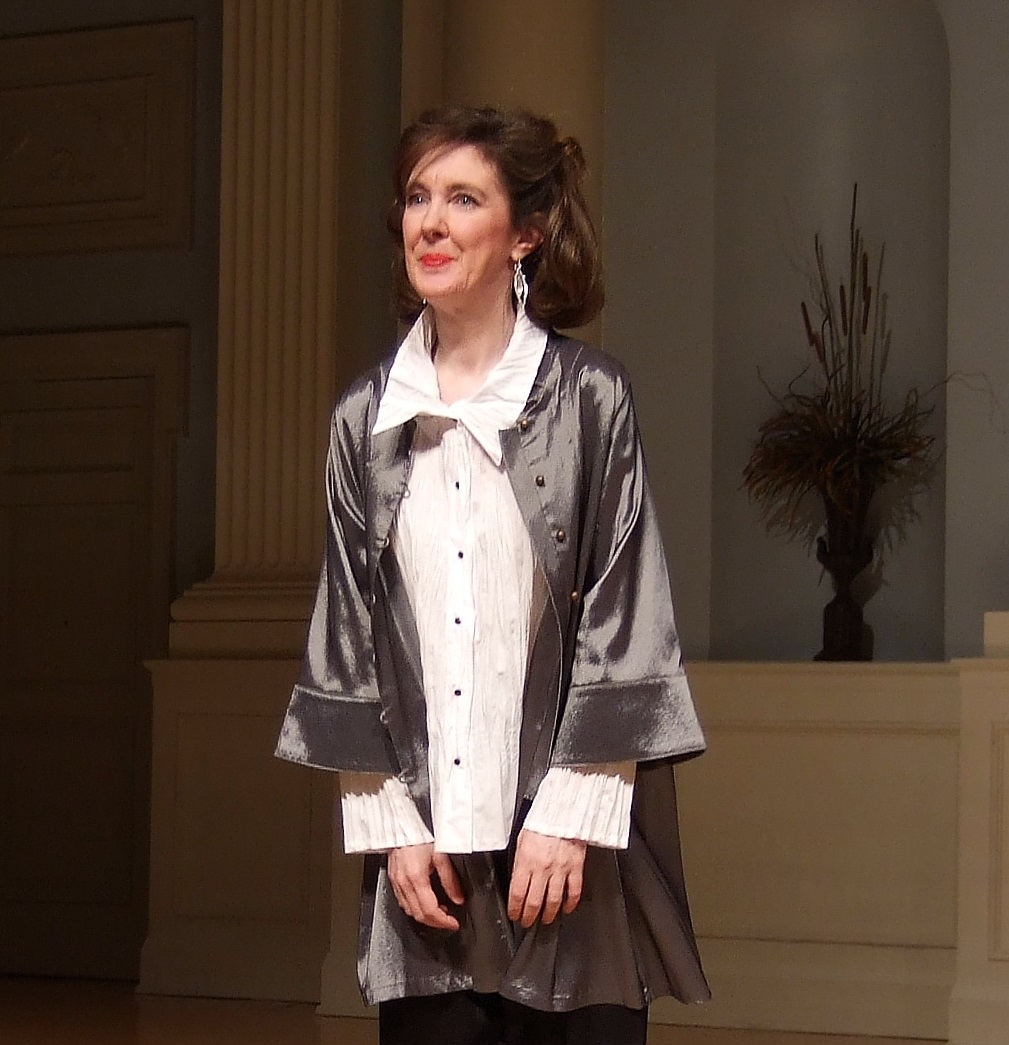
McDermott at Brock Recital Hall in 2011

Anne-Marie McDermott is an American classical pianist and member of the Chamber Music Society of Lincoln Center. She is also the artistic director of the Bravo! Vail Valley Music Festival, the Ocean Reef Chamber Music Festival in Key Largo, Florida, and the Avila Chamber Music Celebration in Curaçao.

== Biography ==
McDermott has received the Avery Fisher Career Development Award, the Andrew Wolf Memorial Chamber Music Award, the Joseph Kalichstein Piano Prize, the Paul A. Fish Memorial Prize, the Bruce Hungerford Memorial Prize, and the Mortimer Levitt Career Development Award for Women Artists.

McDermott's recordings include Prokofiev's complete piano sonatas (on Bridge Records) and George Gershwin's complete works for piano and orchestra. Her recording of Bach's English Suites and Partitas was named Gramophone Magazine's Editor's Choice. She has commissioned works by Charles Wuorinen (Fourth Piano Sonata) and Clarice Assad, which were premiered in May 2009 at Town Hall in New York.

McDermott studied at the Manhattan School of Music. She was a member of the jury of the Van Cliburn International Piano Competition in 2022.
