= Alessandro Taverna =

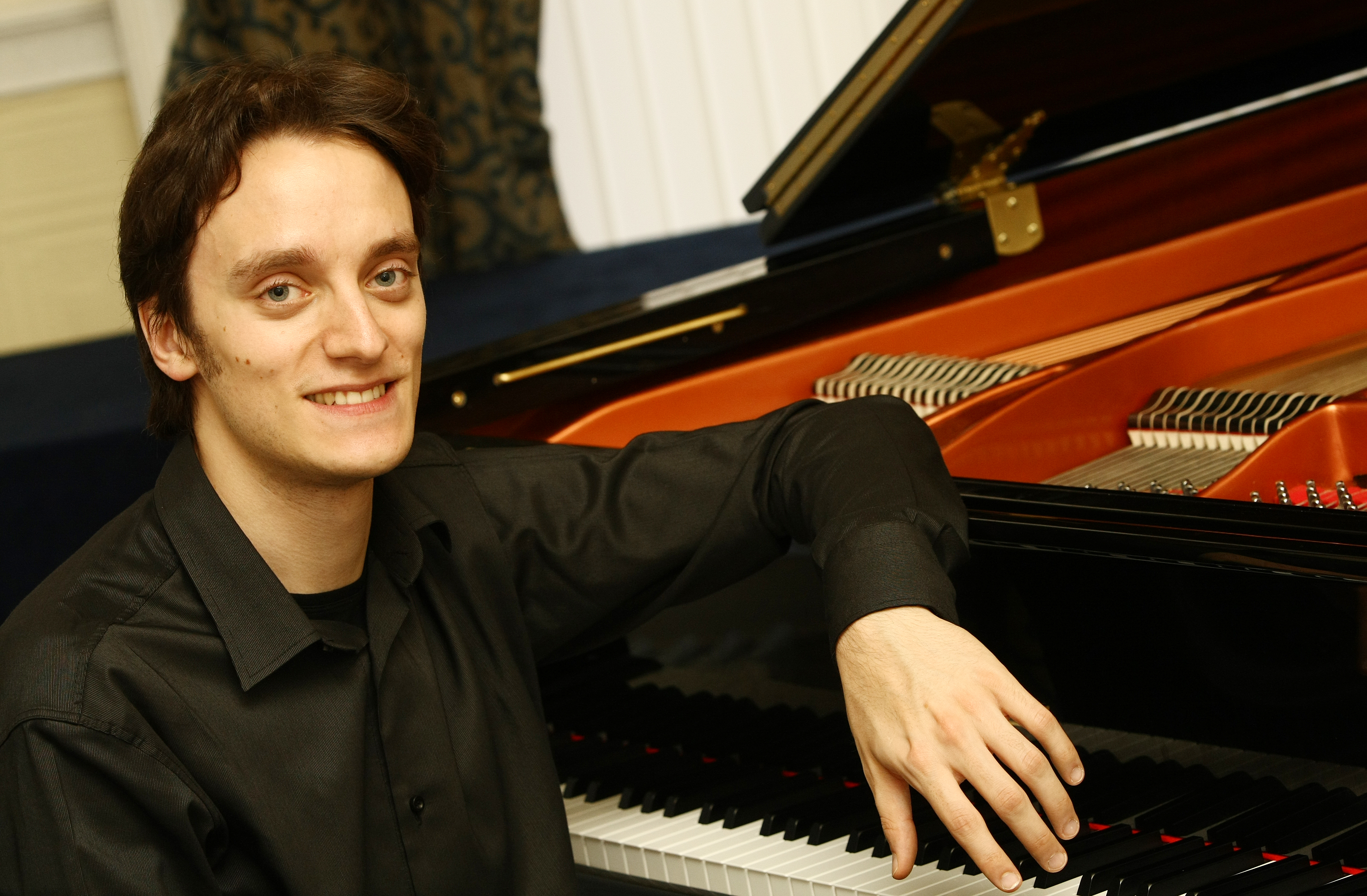

Background information
- Born: 13 September 1983 (age 43)
- Origin: Portogruaro, Venice, Italy
- Occupation: Concert pianist
- Instrument: Piano
- Years active: 2001–present
- Website: www.alessandrotaverna.com

Alessandro Taverna (born 1983 in Portogruaro, Venice) is an Italian pianist. He trained at the Accademia Pianistica "Incontri col Maestro" in Imola with Franco Scala, Leonid Margarius and Boris Petrushansky; he later specialized with Arie Vardi at the Hochschule für Musik, Theater und Medien Hannover and at the International Piano Academy Lake Como working with Dmitri Bashkirov, Malcolm Bilson, Fou Ts'ong, and Stanislav Ioudenitch. He has been a "Lieven Scholar" at the Conservatorio della Svizzera Italiana (Lugano) pursuing his master's degree in Advanced Performance Studies with William Grant Naboré.

== Competition record ==
- 2003 – A. Scriabin, Grosseto: 1st prize
- 2009 – London International Piano Competition, London: 2nd prize
- 2009 – Minnesota International Piano-e-Competition, Minneapolis-Saint Paul: 1st prize
- 2009 – Leeds International Pianoforte Competition, Leeds: 3rd prize
- 2010 – A. Benedetti Michelangeli Prize, Eppan
- 2011 – Busoni International Piano Competition, Bolzano]: 5th prize
