= Mei-Ting Sun =

Mei-Ting Sun (simplified Chinese: 孙梅庭; traditional Chinese: 孫梅庭; pinyin: Sūn Méitíng; born 14 March 1981) is a Chinese classical pianist.

A native of Shanghai, Sun arrived in New York at the age of nine. He entered the Professional Children's School and the Mannes College of Music, where he studied ear training with Marie Powers, theory with Robert Cuckson, and piano with Edward Aldwell. He has since received his bachelor's and master's degrees from the Mannes College of Music. Currently, he is a C.V. Starr Doctoral Fellow at the Juilliard School, studying with Robert McDonald.

Sun was the first prize winner of the 7th National Chopin Piano Competition of the U.S in 2005 and the first International Piano-e-Competition in 2002. Named one of the Musicians of the Year 1996 by the Village Voice at age 15, the now 37-year-old pianist has performed in many of New York's concert halls, including Alice Tully Hall, where his performance of Ravel's Concerto in G was praised by The New York Times as a "stunningly fluid reading."

Sun has been featured several times on WQXR Classical Radio as part of the Young Artist Showcase program and on NPR as part of the Performance Today program. He has been heard in recital in much of the United States, Japan, China, France, Spain and Italy. Recent appearances include concert tours of Spain, China, and Japan, and concerto engagements with the Richmond and Winnipeg Symphonies, the National Spanish Orchestra, the Macau Orchestra, and the Hong Kong Sinfonietta. Upcoming engagements include a twenty concert-tour of the United States and abroad sponsored by the Chopin Foundation of the United States.

Sun is a Yamaha Artist.
