= Decca Gold =

American classical music record label

Decca Gold is a United States–based record label focusing on classical repertoire. It falls under the umbrella of Verve Label Group, owned by Universal Music Group. The label has a new roster of classical artists and partnerships, and was inspired by the historic Decca Gold Label Series established in 1956 that featured artists such as Andrés Segovia, Leonard Bernstein, Claudio Arrau and Dave Brubeck. The label's first album, Emerson String Quartet's Chaconnes and Fantasias: Music of Britten and Purcell, was released on April 21, 2017. Decca Gold partnered with the Van Cliburn International Piano Competition to release recordings of the Gold, Silver and Bronze winners. That album reached No. 1 on the Billboard Classical Traditional Chart.

Although the group's primary focus is on Western classical music, it also has subsidiaries dealing with jazz and musical theater. The main Decca label also issues some pop and country releases.

== Universal Music Classical ==
- Decca Classics
- Deutsche Grammophon
- Philips Records
- Mercury Classics
- Mercury KX

== Decca Records ==
- Decca Records
- Decca Vision
- EmArcy Records

== See also ==
Similar sub-divisions of rival companies:

- EMI Classics (now part of Warner Music Group)
- Sony Masterworks
- Warner Classics
