= Derek Han =

American pianist (1957–2021)

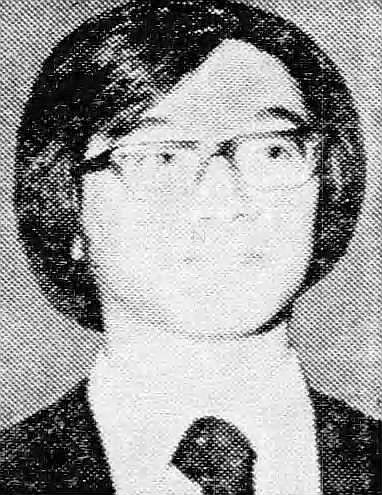
- Han in 1977
- Born: Derek Bing Han; June 17, 1957; Columbus, Ohio, US
- Died: April 8, 2021 (aged 63); Sarasota, Florida, US
- Education: Juilliard School
- Occupations: Pianist; Arts administrator; Financier
- Spouse(s): Simonetta Vaccari (before 1996) Elena de Lalla (m. 1996; div. 2009)
- Children: 4
- Awards: American Music Scholarship Association Piano Competition (1976; third place); Athens International Piano Competition (1977; first prize)

Derek Bing Han (Note: Chinese: 韩祖平; pinyin: Hán Zǔ Píng) (June 17, 1957 – April 8, 2021) was an American pianist, arts administrator, and financier. A musically precocious child, his pianistic career began at the age of 10 with his public debut at a concert of the Columbus Symphony Orchestra. After his graduation from the Juilliard School in 1975, he embarked on a successful career as soloist and chamber partner. In 1986, he was one of the co-founders of La Musica di Asolo festival in Sarasota, Florida. He later moved to that city and remained there for the rest of his life. In his later years, Han became a successful businessman who was active in Europe and China.

== Biography ==
=== Early life ===
Han was born in Columbus, Ohio, on June 17, 1957. His parents were Chinese immigrants who had met while enrolled in a doctorate program at Ohio State University, where they later taught. Although he learned to speak his parents' native Shanghainese at home, Han told an interviewer for the China Daily in 2012 that he felt unsure about how "authentically Chinese" he was.

Han did not initially demonstrate interest in music; his parents did not come from families with musical backgrounds. He was enrolled in piano classes around 1962 as a means to focus his attention in school, where teachers had complained about his disruptive behavior. According to the Sarasota Herald-Tribune, Han's piano lessons originated from rivalry with his sister to earn their mother's approval. He was soon found to be precociously talented.

Between the ages of 5 and 11, Han studied piano with Rolland Saltz. In a 1988 interview, Saltz said Han, whose talent was immediately discernible, was one of his best students: "When I began teaching Derek, the first thing he said was, 'Mr. Saltz, I'm going to be a concert pianist when I grow up'". At the age of 10, Han made his public debut in a Columbus Symphony Orchestra concert as soloist in the Piano Concerto No. 2 by Ludwig van Beethoven. After studying piano with Saltz, Han earned a full scholarship to continue his studies at the Juilliard School. His teachers there included Guido Agosti, Gina Bachauer, Ilona Kabos, Lili Kraus, and Nadia Reisenberg. Han graduated in 1975.

When Han told his parents that he intended to become a professional musician, they reacted with displeasure. "In China, the eldest son became a musician only if he were extremely lazy or extremely stupid", he later said. "I think they were afraid I was going to live on the sidewalk and wing it".

=== Maturity ===
In 1975, Han competed in the Atlanta Young Artists Competition, where he placed among the semi-finalists. The following year, he participated in the American Music Scholarship Association Piano Competition held in Cincinnati; he shared third place. Han was among the contestants in the 1977 Van Cliburn International Piano Competition. That same year, he won the first prize at the Athens International Piano Competition and began his professional career.

Throughout the late 1970s and into the 1980s, Han regularly performed in North America and Europe. Among his notable appearances were those at the Marlboro Festival, where he had been invited by Rudolf Serkin, as well as recitals at Alice Tully Hall and Carnegie Hall. For a period of three years he toured together with the violinist Leonid Kogan. He also played with the Sinfonia Varsovia conducted by Yehudi Menuhin. In the course of his performing career, Han played for various dignitaries, including Nelson Mandela, Carlos Menem, and three presidents of the United States.

In 1986, Han was among the founding members of La Musica di Asolo, later renamed to La Musica, an annual music festival in Sarasota, Florida. It was based on a festival in Asolo, Italy, where Han had previously lived. He was the festival's associate artistic director, a position he held for life. He also held advisory roles with the Zagreb Philharmonic Orchestra (1988–1990) and Moscow Symphony Orchestra (1990–1992), and was artistic director of the Chamber Music Festival in Trieste.

Han's discography expanded significantly in the 1990s and early 2000s. Among his recordings were complete cycles of the concertos by Beethoven, Franz Joseph Haydn, and Wolfgang Amadeus Mozart. He also recorded music by Johannes Brahms, Sergei Rachmaninoff, Dmitri Shostakovich, and Pyotr Ilyich Tchaikovsky.

=== Later years ===
Through his first wife, Han inherited $50,000,000 in 1988 (equivalent to about $136,100,000 in 2025). Having gained what he called "a barrel of cash", he had to learn financial management. He later became one of the founding partners of a private bank in Switzerland. In 2003, he also joined Lowell Capital, an English brokerage firm. He became chairman in 2005, whereupon he renamed the firm to Blue Oak Capital, then later North Square Blue Oak. Han redirected the firm's focus to China, where he maintained an office in Dongsi Subdistrict, Beijing. "There are other musician colleagues who have important aspects to their non-musical life but this happens to be a sort of high-energy activity", he told an interviewer. "In some ways, however, having this intense exposure to the more practical financial world gives me a deeper appreciation of music and a real solace from it also".

=== Death ===
In early 2021, Han traveled to Italy to meet with the violinist Bruno Giuranna, artistic director of La Musica. Upon his return to the United States, Han complained to friends that he had contracted "a hideous cold". He visited one of his sons in California, then returned home to Sarasota. Although Han reported improvements in symptoms and had twice tested negative for COVID-19, he died from its related complications in Sarasota on April 8, 2021.

== Reception ==
In a profile of Han's life and work, Steinway & Sons said that "[his pianism] was original though fairly straightforward in its lucid tones, spirited character, and technical fluidity and accuracy". Appraising a performance of Rachmaninoff's Rhapsody on a Theme by Paganini, the music critic Peter Palmer wrote in the Nottingham Evening Post that he enjoyed Han's precision, and said that "the best things about his playing were its freshness and sense of proportion". Anthony Payne, in a review for The Independent, wrote of Han's performance of Tchaikovsky's Piano Concerto No. 1 that the pianist "gave full weight to the music's majestic lyrical processes and responded to climactic moments with exhilarating bravura". Payne also noted Han's avoidance of "artificial excitement". In a review for the Birmingham Post of another performance of the same concerto, the music critic Stephen Daw said he was impressed by Han's "very convincing technical exuberance", illustrated by the ease with which the pianist caught his own eyeglasses when they fell off during one of the work's more strenuous moments.

Reviews of Han's recordings in the American Record Guide were mixed. Allen Linkowski said that Han was "not a particularly imaginative player", while Donald Vroon called his playing "quite neutral". Tom Godell, however, described Han as "underrated" and favorably compared his recording of Mozart's Piano Concerto No. 20 to one by Rudolf Serkin.

== Personal life ==
Han's first wife was Simonetta Vaccari, the daughter of one of the co-founders of the Italian sporting goods company Nordica. His second wife was Elena de Lalla. They met aboard a flight on Delta Air Lines, where she worked as a stewardess. The couple lived together with their children in Milan before their final move to Sarasota. They divorced in 2009.

Between both marriages, Han had four children.
