= Vladimir Khomyakov =

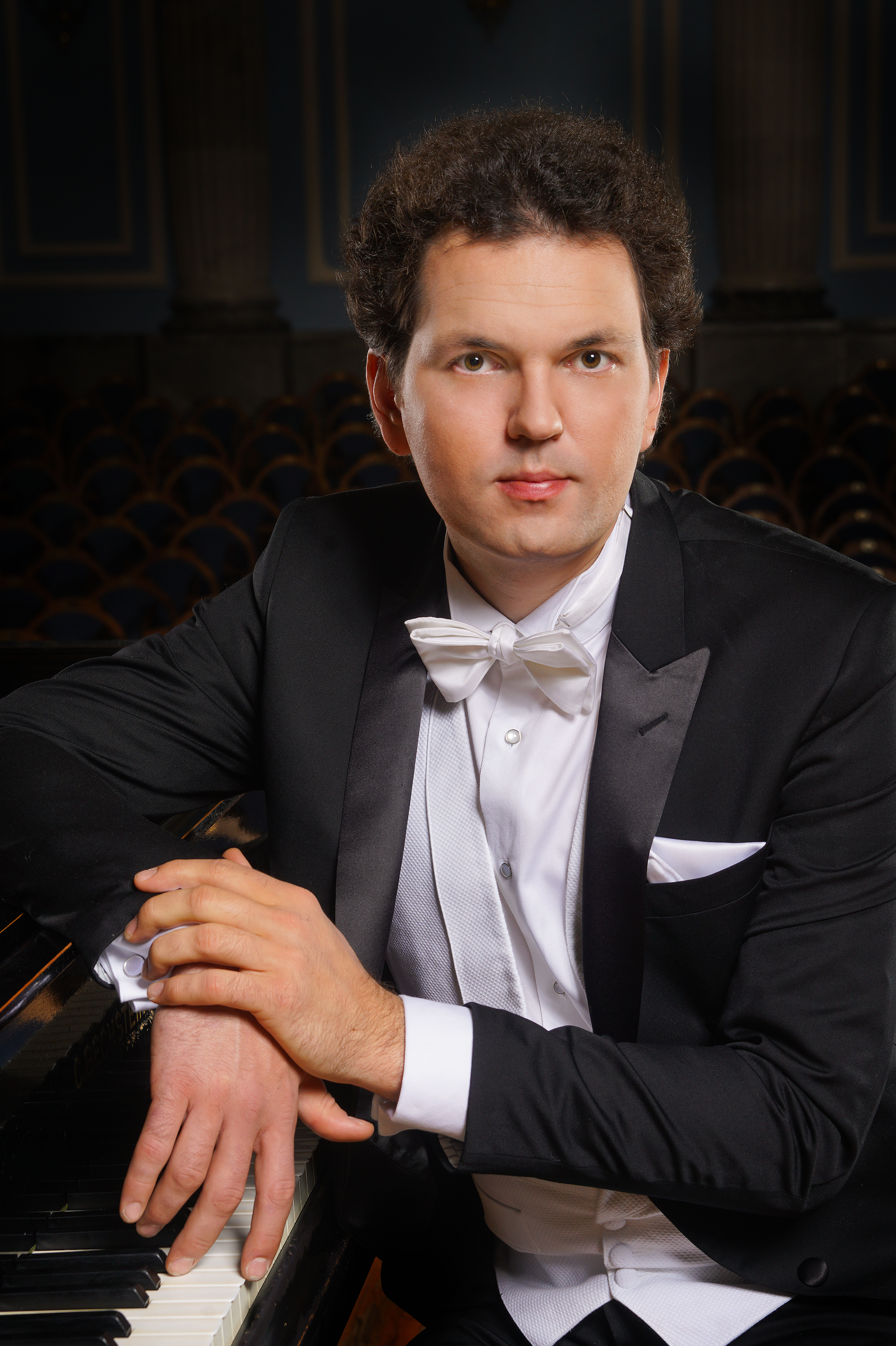

Background information
- Born: August 6, 1984 (age 41); Kirovohrad, Ukraine
- Genres: Classical
- Occupation(s): Pianist, conductor
- Instrument: Piano
- Years active: 2000–present
- Website: vladimirkhomyakov.com

Vladimir Vladimirovich Khomyakov (Russian: Влади́мир Влади́мирович Хомяко́в; born August 6, 1984) is an American pianist.

== Early years ==
Vladimir Khomyakov was born in Kirovohrad (Ukraine) to a family of professional musicians, graduates of Odesa Conservatory.

He started his music studies at the age of four with his mother Olga Donskaya. At the age of six Khomyakov began lessons at Chelyabinsk Special Music School with Lyudmila Ekimova, and has performed his first solo recital at the age of ten at Chelyabinsk Philharmonic Society.

== Education ==
After winning First Prize in IV Saint Petersburg Open Piano Competition in 2000, Khomyakov began his studies at the Saint Petersburg Conservatory with Alexander Sandler. He graduated in 2008 with master's degree in piano performance, chamber music and piano pedagogy. Thereafter he continued his post-graduate studies at the Moscow Conservatory with Yuri Martynov (piano department of Mikhail Voskresensky).

In 2009 Khomyakov moved to the United States to study with pianist Daniel Pollack. He got accepted into prestigious Artist Diploma program at the University of Southern California Thornton School of Music (Los Angeles), which he finished with honors, being named an outstanding graduate of the year.

In 2016 he finished Doctor of Musical Arts program at the Thornton School, in piano with Daniel Pollack and in instrumental conducting with Larry J. Livingston.

Additionally, Khomyakov supplemented his studies in numerous master-classes and educational programs, including Holland Music Sessions (Bargen, Netherlands), ISAM Academy (Michelstadt, Germany), and Summer Academy of Mozarteum University (Salzburg, Austria), where he studied with Dmitri Bashkirov. His other mentors in different years were Aleksey Nasedkin, Mikhail Voskresensky, Pavel Egorov, Yuri Rozum, Arie Vardi, Naum Shtarkman, Stewart L. Gordon.

== Concert appearances ==
During his years of studies Khomyakov won various prizes in international piano competitions, including Anton Rubinstein Competition (Dresden, Germany), Emil Gilels Competition (Odesa, Ukraine), Maria Canals International Music Competition (Barcelona, Spain), José Iturbi International Music Competition (Los Angeles), Hilton Head International Piano Competition (Hilton Head Island, South Carolina), Ima Hogg Competition (Houston), and others.

Khomyakov has performed as soloist with various orchestras around the world, including Houston Symphony, Dresden Philharmonic, Ningbo Symphony Orchestra, Novosibirsk Philharmonic Orchestra, Tomsk Philharmonic Orchestra, Volga Philharmonic Orchestra, Togliatti Philharmonic Orchestra, Barnaul Philharmonic Orchestra, Chelyabinsk Opera Orchestra, "Klassika" Chamber Orchestra, Voronezh State Symphony Orchestra, USC Symphony Orchestra, collaborating with renown conductors, such as Thomas Sanderling, Aziz Shokhakimov, Daniel Hege, Yaroslav Tkalenko, Cheng Hao, Anton Grishanin.

Khomyakov is currently represented by Classical Music Artists Management (Moscow - New York City).

== Teaching positions ==
Beginning in the fall of 2016, Khomyakov holds the position of Associate Professor at Saddleback College (Mission Viejo, California).

Since his early years of studies at the University of Southern California, he has been chosen to be an assistant to Daniel Pollack and teach weekly master-classes at the Thornton School.

== Awards ==
Khomyakov has won the following awards:

- 2013 – Ima Hogg Competition (USA) – 2nd prize and silver medal
- 2013 – Bell T. Ritchie Award (USA) – 1st place
- 2011 – Susan Torres Award (USA) – 1st place
- 2010 – Hilton Head International Piano Competition (USA) – Medalist
- 2010 – José Iturbi International Music Competition (USA) – Audience Choice award
- 2009 – José Iturbi International Music Competition (USA) – 4th place and Audience Choice award
- 2009 – Maria Canals International Music Competition (Spain) – 4th place
- 2008 – Siegfried Weishaupt International Piano Competition (Germany) – 1st prize
- 2006 – Emil Gilels International Piano Competition (Ukraine) – Diploma and Best Transcription Performance prize
- 2005 – Anton Rubinstein Competition (Germany) – 3rd prize and Audience prize
- 2000 – IV Saint Petersburg Open Piano Competition (Russia) – 1st prize

== Recordings ==
- 2022 – Scratch: Scriabin, Rachmaninoff, Tchaikovsky, solo album
- 2021 – Romance, solo album
- 2018 – Schumann – Liszt – Prokofiev, solo album
