= José Iturbi International Music Competition =

The José Iturbi International Music Competition is a music competition named after the Spanish piano virtuoso José Iturbi. It was established by the José Iturbi Foundation in 2007 and takes place at the University of California Los Angeles. The competition has two tracks: one for pianists and the other for opera singers. The competition is open to pianists and singers of all nationalities between the ages of 17 and 35. The competition's co-founder, Donelle Dadidgan, is the founder of the Hollywood Museum and the goddaughter of José Iturbi. Initially held annually from 2007 to 2010, the next competition was scheduled in 2013.

== Prizes ==
Cash prizes are awarded to the winners, with $50,000 going to the First Prize winners in the piano and voice competitions. The competition also awards the "Spanish Prize", the "American Prize", and the "People's Choice Award".

== Judges ==
The competition has separate judges for the piano and voice sections. The following were the judges for the 2010 competition:

Piano

Concert pianists Daniel Pollack (Chairman) and Ilana Vered, conductors Jorge Mester and Lalo Schifrin, and Los Angeles Times music critic Mark Swed

Voice

Former Director of Columbia Artists Management vocal division Matthew Epstein (Chairman) and opera singers David Daniels, Marilyn Horne, Carol Vaness, and Peter Kazaras

== Past First Prize winners ==
=== Piano ===
- 2007 Rufus Choi
- 2008 Maria Kim
- 2009 Dmitri Levkovich
- 2010 Stanislav Khristenko

=== Voice ===
- 2007 Karen Slack, soprano
- 2008 Angela Meade, soprano
- 2009 Leah Crocetto, soprano
- 2010 Sasha Cooke, mezzo-soprano
