= Bösendorfer and Yamaha USASU International Piano Competition =

- Current: 10th Bösendorfer and Yamaha USASU International Piano Competition
- Venue: Katzin Concert Hall, School of Music, Dance and Theatre, Arizona State University
- First award: 2006; 20 years ago
- Website: pianocompetition.music.asu.edu

The Bösendorfer and Yamaha USASU International Piano Competition is a biennial piano competition held at Arizona State University's Herberger Institute for Design and the Arts since 2006. The competition has three categories: Yamaha Junior for pianists ages 13-15; Yamaha Senior for pianists ages 16-18; and Bosendorfer for pianists ages 19-32. It awards over $50,000 in prize money.

== Prize winners ==
=== Bösendorfer ===
	1st Prize	2nd Prize	3rd Prize
2025	(Ukraine) Roman Fediurko	(China) Yang (Jack) Gao	(Croatia) Jan Nikovich
2023	(United States) Rachel Breen	(South Korea) Young Sun Choi	(South Korea) Dohyun Lee
2019	(Ukraine) Dmytro Choni	(South Korea) Hyo-Eun Park	(United States) Peter Klimo
2017	(China) Xuesha Hu	(China) Yutong Sun	(China) Yuchong Wu
2015	(South Korea) Sung Chang	(South Korea) EunAe Lee	not awarded
2013	(United States) Eric Zuber	(South Korea) Jaekyung Yoo	(United States) Lindsay Garritson
2011	(Brazil) Ronaldo Rolim	(Russia) Anastasia Dedik	(Russia) (United States) Konstantin Soukhovetski
2009	(Russia) Stanislav Khristenko	(Kazakhstan) Daniyar Yessimkhanov	(China) Yue Chu
2008	(South Korea) Sangyoung Kim	(Israel) Yoni Levyatov	(China) Chaoyin Cai
2007	(United States) Elizabeth Schumann	(United States) Grace Fong	(United States) Tanya Gabrielian
2006	(Russia) Anastasia Markina	(Canada) Dmitri Levkovich	(United States) Esther Park

=== Yamaha Senior ===
Year	1st Prize	2nd Prize	3rd Prize
2025	(China) Xuanyan Gong	(United States) Truman Walker	(South Korea) Seoeun Lee
2023	(Ukraine) Roman Fediurko	(South Korea) Seungmin Shin	(United States) Haruki Takeuchi
2019	(United States) Catherine Huang	(China) Yongqiu Liu	(China) Yangrui Cai
2017	(United States) Andrew Zhao	(China) Lingfei Xie	(Canada) Arthur Wang
2015	(United States) Vanessa Meiling Haynes	not awarded	(South Korea) Chaeyoung Park
2013	(Italy) Leonardo Colafelice	(Taiwan) (United States) Gabrielle Chou	(China) Ming Xie
2011	(Mexico) Anthony Giovann Tamayo Illescas	(United States) Kevin Ahfat	(South Korea) Min Joo Yi
2009	not awarded	(United States) Reed Tetzloff	(South Korea) Yung Hoon Chun
2008	(Israel) Ilia Ulianitsky	(United States) Ashley Hsu	(Canada) Devon Joiner
2007	(United States) Kenric Tam	(United States) Sophia Muñoz	(United States) Christopher Rice
2006	(Hungary) (Japan) Miyuji Kaneko	(United States) Charlie Albright	(Israel) Ilia Ulianitsky

=== Yamaha Junior ===
Year	1st Prize	2nd Prize	3rd Prize
2025	(China) Ji Qinyaoyao	(Ukraine) Oleksandr Fediurko	(United States) Everett Leigh
2023	(South Korea) Seokyoung Hong	(Hong Kong) (Canada) Andrew Sijie Li	(United States) Xinran Shi
2019	(China) Ruisi Lao	(United States) Kevin Cho	(United States) Katherine E. Liu
2017	(United States) William Chen	(United States) Edward Zhang	(United States) Anne Liu
2015	(China) Haozhou Wang	(United States) Elliot Wuu	(United States) Charlie Liu (tie)
2015	(China) Haozhou Wang	(United States) Elliot Wuu	(United States) Allison To (tie)
2013	(Canada) Tony Yike Yang	(United States) Carmen Knoll	(United States) Patrick Pan
2011	(Canada) Tristan Teo	(United States) Phoebe Pan	(United States) Gabrielle Chou
2009	(China) Qi Kong	(South Korea) Chung Man Kim	(China) Miao Yang
2008	(China) Xinzhe Jiang	(South Korea) Joonghun Cho	not awarded
2007	(South Korea) Min Soo Hong	(China) Wei Xin Zhou	(China) Liyan He
2006	(Japan) (United States) David Ko	(Singapore) Abigail Sin	(Canada) Andrew Wang (tie)
2006	(Japan) (United States) David Ko	(Singapore) Abigail Sin	(United States) Helen Jing (tie)

=== Medal table ===
Bösendorfer and Yamaha USASU International Piano Competition Medal Table
Rank	Nation	Gold	Silver	Bronze	Total
1	United States	8	12	13	33
2	China	5	4	7	16
3	South Korea	3	5	3	11
4	Canada	2	1	3	6
5	Russia	2	1	1	4
6	Japan	2	0	0	2
7	Israel	1	1	1	3
8	Brazil	1	0	0	1
8	Hungary	1	0	0	1
8	Italy	1	0	0	1
8	Mexico	1	0	0	1
8	Ukraine	1	0	0	1
13	Kazakhstan	0	1	0	1
13	Singapore	0	1	0	1
Totals (14 entries)		28	26	28	82
