= George Li =

American concert pianist (born 1995)

George Li 黎卓宇
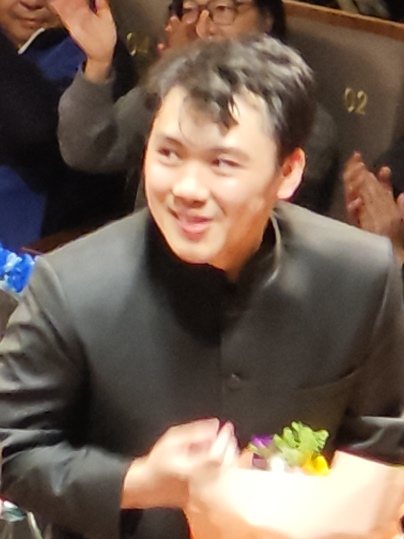

Background information
- Born: August 24, 1995 (age 31)
- Origin: Boston, Massachusetts
- Genre: Classical
- Occupation: Pianist
- Instrument: Piano
- Years active: 2004-present
- Label: Warner Classics
- Website: www.georgelipianist.com

George Li (Chinese: 黎卓宇; pinyin: Lí zhuōyǔ; born August 24, 1995) is an American concert pianist who was a recipient of an Avery Fisher Career Grant in 2016 and silver medalist of the 2015 International Tchaikovsky Competition.

== Early life ==
George Li was born on August 24, 1995, in Boston, Massachusetts, to parents from the People's Republic of China. He began piano lessons at the age of 4, and later studied with Yin Chengzong, before transferring to teachers Wha Kyung Byun and Russell Sherman at the prestigious Walnut Hill School for the Arts and New England Conservatory.

== Education ==
He graduated from the prestigious Walnut Hill School and the New England Conservatory Preparatory School, where he studied with Wha Kyung Byun and Russell Sherman.

Accepted at Curtis Institute of Music, The Juilliard School, Harvard University, and Yale University, Li chose to enroll in the highly-selective and prestigious dual degree program at Harvard University and the New England Conservatory, where he graduated in 2018. He received his New England Conservatory's artist diploma program in 2022.

== Career ==
Quickly identified as unusually talented, he won first prizes in Massachusetts Music Teachers state competitions consecutively at 6 and 7 years old. He then made his recital debut at 8 years old in Boston, MA. At 9 years old, Li then made his orchestral debut with the Xiamen Philharmonic and additionally won second prize in both the Cincinnati World Piano Competition and the Virginia Waring International Piano Competition all before 10 years old. Since then, he has been a recitalist, chamber musician, and an International traveling concerto soloist.

At the age of 11, he made his Carnegie Hall debut, which was featured in the new TV series produced by NPR, From the Top and two weeks after, Li appeared on the Martha Stewart Show to perform. In 2008, Li won the second prize in the Gina Bachauer International Piano Junior Artist Competition.

In 2010, 14-year-old Li captured first prize in the inaugural Cooper International Piano Competition Just months after his triumph in Oberlin, George Li captured first prize in the 2010 Young Concert Artists International Auditions. On June 7, 2011, Li performed at the White House Rose Garden for President Barack Obama and Michelle Obama, German Chancellor Dr. Angela Merkel and her husband Dr. Joachim Sauer at a state dinner.

On June 23, 2011, 16-year-old Li was selected to be one of the two recipients of the 2012 Gilmore Young Artist Award. He is currently the youngest recipient of the award at 16 years old.

On July 1, 2015, Li won second prize, tied with Lukas Geniušas, in the XV International Tchaikovsky Competition. Since then, he has enjoyed a busy international performing career, including recitals, chamber music performances, and appearances with major orchestras in North America, Asia, and Europe.

In 2016, he was one of the four recipients of the 2016 Avery Fisher Career Grant.

Among the orchestras he has soloed with include the Los Angeles Philharmonic, Mariinsky Orchestra, Orchestre National de Lyon, Deutsches Symphonie-Orchester Berlin, St. Petersburg Philharmonic, Rotterdam Philharmonic, Cleveland Orchestra, Xiamen Philharmonic Orchestra, Royal Liverpool Philharmonic Orchestra, Simon Bolivar Symphony Orchestra, Boston Philharmonic Orchestra, Brooklyn Philharmonic, Waltham Symphony Orchestra, Princeton Symphony Orchestra, Albany Symphony Orchestra, Lexington Symphony Orchestra, and Detroit Symphony Orchestra.

== Life ==
When not playing piano, George is an avid reader with a passion for classic English and French literature, exploring nature landscape photography, as well as a loyal Arsenal F.C. fan. Li currently resides in Lexington, Massachusetts.
