= Tony Yike Yang =

Canadian-Chinese pianist (born 1998)

- 杨艺可
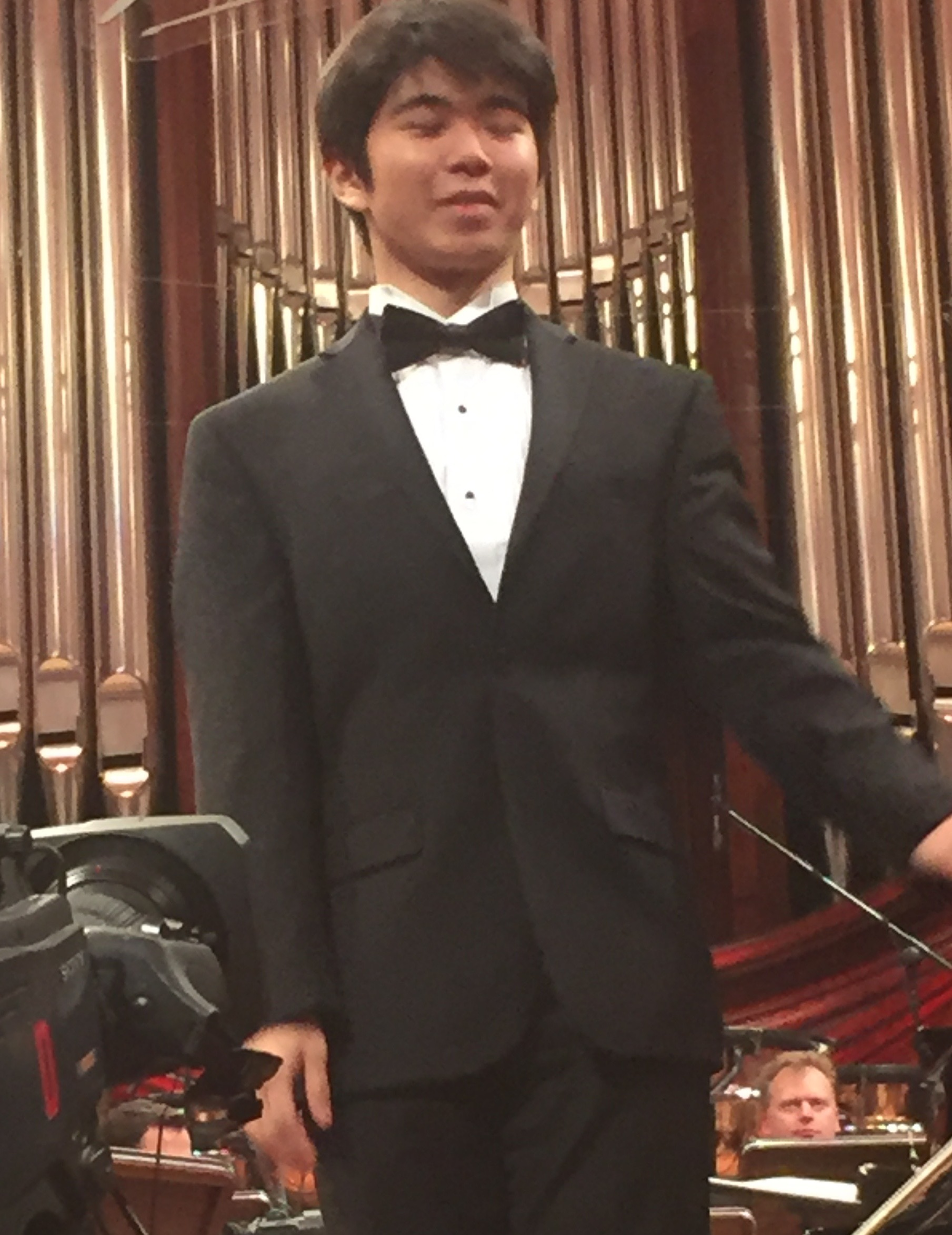
- Yang in 2015
- Born: December 7, 1998 (age 27); Chongqing, China
- Education: Harvard University (BA)
- Occupation: Musician
- Musical career
- Genres: Classical
- Instrument: Piano
- Website: tonyyikeyang.com

Tony Yike Yang (born December 7, 1998) is a Chinese-Canadian pianist.

== Early life and education ==
Yang was born in Chongqing, China, to Chinese parents. He and his parents immigrated to Toronto, Canada in 2004. He began piano studies at the age of five with his mother who was his first teacher. Later on, he studied at the Juilliard Pre-College with Julian Martin as a full-scholarship student, and The Phil and Eli Taylor Performance Academy of The Royal Conservatory of Music with James Anagnoson.

Yang graduated from Harvard University with a Bachelor of Arts in economics. He is currently an Artist-in-Residence at the Ingesund Piano Center in Sweden under the guidance of Julia Mustonen-Dahlkvist.

== Career ==
As a soloist, Yang has collaborated with orchestras such as the Cleveland Orchestra, Warsaw Philharmonic, Orchestre Métropolitain, Fort Worth Symphony Orchestra and the Edmonton Symphony Orchestra among others. He has also appeared at venues such as Carnegie Hall in New York, Koerner Hall in Toronto, Warsaw National Philharmonic, Great Hall of the Moscow Conservatory, Athenaeum in Bucharest, Tokyo Metropolitan Theatre, Seoul Arts Center, National Arts Centre in Ottawa, The Esplanade in Singapore, and the Guangzhou Opera House.

In 2015, Yang won the Fifth Prize at the 17th XVII International Chopin Piano Competition in Warsaw, becoming the youngest-ever laureate in the history of the competition at sixteen years old. Previously, he was the winner of the Thomas & Evon Cooper International Competition in 2014 and the Bösendorfer & Yamaha USASU International Junior Piano Competition in 2013. He has also received top prizes at many other competitions such as the Hilton Head International Piano Competition and the Gina Bachauer International Junior Piano Competition.

== Awards ==
- 2012: Gina Bachauer International Junior Piano Competition – Second Prize
- 2013: Bösendorfer and Yamaha USASU International Junior Piano Competition – First Prize
- 2013: Hilton Head International Piano Competition – Third Prize
- 2014: Thomas & Evon Cooper International Competition – First Prize
- 2015: XVII International Chopin Piano Competition – Fifth Prize and the Ewa & Włodzimierz Kamirski Award for the Youngest Finalist
- 2017: Fifteenth Van Cliburn International Piano Competition – Jury Discretionary Award
- 2021: Harvard University – Robert Levin Prize in Musical Performance

== Discography ==
Title	Album details
Chopin: Sonata B-Moll / Ballada F-Moll / Mazurki	Released: October 25, 2016; Label: Fryderyk Chopin Institute; Format: CD, digital download, streaming
