= Paul Pollei =

American pianist (1936–2013)

- Born: Paul Cannon Pollei; May 9, 1936; Salt Lake City, Utah, US
- Died: July 18, 2013 (aged 77)
- Education: East High School; University of Utah; Eastman School of Music; Florida State University; Sherwood Music School
- Occupation: Pianist
- Spouse: Norene Barrus (m. 1960)

Paul Cannon Pollei (May 9, 1936 – July 18, 2013) was an American pianist and member of the piano faculty at Brigham Young University (BYU). Pollei retired as a faculty member at BYU in 2001. During his time at BYU, he co-founded the American Piano Quartet, which remains active after his death. He was an international ambassador for piano music, as well as a frequent lecturer and teacher. He founded the Gina Bachauer International Piano Foundation in 1976, serving as director until 2013. The foundation sponsors many competitions and festivals. Pollei was also active on many advisory boards and a member of many organizations, including the Music Teachers National Association (MTNA). He was given an award in 2002 for his work in the arts. Pollei wrote about piano pedagogy and instruction for various professional journals in the United States and authored two books on the subject.

== Early life and education ==
Paul Pollei was born on May 9, 1936, to Eric and Emily Cannon Pollei in Salt Lake City, Utah. He began studying the piano at age five and played throughout his youth. Pollei attended East High School, and completed his undergraduate degree at the University of Utah. Following his graduation, Pollei attended the Eastman School of Music in Rochester, New York, to earn his master's degree, and taught general music and theory at Carthage Central School in Carthage, New York. Pollei received his PhD at Florida State University in 1975, and later spent time at the Sherwood Music School in Chicago, Illinois.

== Career ==
In 1976, Pollei founded the Gina Bachauer International Piano Foundation and served as its director until his retirement in 2013. The foundation sponsors various piano festivals and international competitions, including the Gina Bachauer International Piano Competition, which is now the second-largest piano competition in the United States. The competition originally began as the BYU Summer Piano Festival and International Competition, and in 1980, was renamed after a longtime Utah Symphony pianist and moved from Provo to Salt Lake City.

Pollei was a member of the advisory boards of the Van Cliburn International Piano Competition, the United Nations International Education Board, and the National Piano Foundation, and served as a jury member for various national and international piano competitions. He was also very active throughout his life with the National Conference on Piano Pedagogy and the World Federation of Music Competitions. Pollei was a faculty member for the Tuacahn Center for the Arts in St. George, Utah, and also served as founding music faculty member and advisor for the music faculty at the Waterford School in Sandy, Utah.

Throughout his career, Pollei presented workshops, lectures, and master classes to pianists both in the United States and internationally. Pollei was a long-time member of the Music Teachers National Association (MTNA). His work with the MTNA included serving on the National Certification Commission, and in 2009, he was named an MTNA Foundation Fellow. He was also awarded the Madeleine Award for Outstanding Contributions to the Arts in Utah in 2002.

Pollei was the author of Pedagogical Tips for Piano Teaching in 1969 and Essential Technique for the Pianist: An Organized and Systematic Method of Teaching Piano Technique in 1996.

=== Affiliation with BYU ===
Pollei was the coordinator of graduate keyboard studies and a member of the piano faculty at BYU for over forty years, retiring in 2001. While at BYU, Pollei was a co-founder and member of the American Piano Quartet, a group which utilizes two pianos and eight hands in order to play complex pieces. The quartet was formed in 1984 when the grandmother of one of Pollei's students gave him a piece designed to be played by four pianists. The group has performed in concerts in the United States and has continued an active career following Pollei's death.

Pollei made various donations to the BYU Library, which are now housed in the Paul Pollei Piano Collection, a collection of over 6,000 piano music scores—including many foreign and scholarly editions—located in the Music and Dance section of the library. This collection interfaces with past donations made by Pollei to the library. The collection includes around 5,000 LP sound recordings, an estimated 300 books, and thousands of piano pedagogical resources, as well as some personal papers of Gina Bachauer and of Pollei himself.

== Personal life ==
Pollei was married to Norene Barrus on June 24, 1960, in the Salt Lake Temple, and the couple had two children. Pollei was an active member of the Church of Jesus Christ of Latter-day Saints and served as a ward bishop, a Primary pianist, and as a missionary in France and Belgium. He died on July 18, 2013, at the age of 77.
