= XV Gina Bachauer International Piano Competition =

The fifteenth Gina Bachauer International Piano Competition took place in Salt Lake City, Utah, from June 16 to July 1, 2010. Rounds one and two were held at Rose Wagner Performing Arts Center. The final round was held at Abravanel Hall with the Utah Symphony.

== Awards ==
Award	Winner	Details
First prize	Lukas Geniušas (Russia)	The first prize of $30,000 US awarded by Kirk and Susan Boman Commemorative gold medal awarded by Stephanie Saint-Thomas; Utah Symphony and other concert engagements CD recording of selected solo repertory
Second prize	Serhiy Salov (Ukraine)	Second prize of $15,000 US awarded by anonymous donor Commemorative silver medal awarded by Stephanie Saint-Thomas; Utah Symphony and other concert engagements CD recording of selected solo repertory
Third prize	Dmitri Levkovich (Ukraine)	The Joanne Baker Memorial third prize of $10,000 US Commemorative bronze medal awarded by Stephanie Saint-Thomas; Concert engagements CD recording of selected solo repertory
Fourth prize	Yunjie Chen (China)	Cash award of $8,000 US awarded by Ned and Kimberly Warner and Brad and Karen Beagles CD recording of selected solo repertory
Fifth prize	Kotaro Fukuma (Japan)	Cash award of $7,000 US CD recording of selected solo repertory
Sixth prize	Zhang Zuo (China)	The Dr. Stanley B. Kimball Memorial Sixth Prize of $6,000 US awarded by Chase Kimball CD recording of selected solo repertory
Audience prize	Lukas Geniušas (Russia)	Cash award of $500 US awarded by Russell A. Cannon and Marilyn J. Cannon

== Jury ==
9 jurors:

- ~~Hui-Qiao Bao~~ (China) – could not attend due to visa issues
- ~~Bernadene Blaha~~ (Canada) – withdrew due to personal emergency
- Gennady Dzubenko (Russia)
- Douglas Humpherys (USA)
- Dae-Jin Kim (South Korea)
- Jie Lu – replacement juror (China/USA)
- Yuko Ninomiya (Japan)
- Walter Ponce (Bolivia/USA)
- Dmitry Rachmanov (Russia) – replacement juror
- John Roos (South Africa)
- ~~Einar Steen-Nøkleberg~~ (Norway) – withdrew due to personal emergency
- Nelita True (USA) (chairperson)

== Competition results by round ==
=== Round one and round two (semifinals, 38 competitors) ===
- Charlie Albright (USA)
- Yunjie Chen (China)
- Stefan Ciric (Serbia)
- Sara Daneshpour (USA)
- Gregory DeTurck (USA)
- Sebastian Di Bin (Italy)
- Nazareno Ferruggio (Italy)
- Kotaro Fukuma (Japan)
- Lukas Geniušas (Russia)
- Pavel Gintov (Ukraine)
- Dorel Golan (Israel)
- Yoonjung Han (South Korea)
- Fazliddin Husanov (Uzbekistan)
- Daria Kameneva (Russia)
- Benjamin Kim (USA)
- Soyeon Kim (South Korea)
- Andrea Lam (Australia)
- Viviana Pia Lasaracina (Italy)
- Alexei Lebedev (Russia)
- Dmitri Levkovich (Ukraine)
- Benjamin Moser (Germany)
- Seejoon Park (South Korea)
- Mayumi Sakamoto (Japan)
- Serhiy Salov (Ukraine)
- Nima Sarkechik (France)
- ~~Anastasia Solomatina~~ (Russia) – withdrew before Round One
- Ardita Statovci (Kosovo)
- Olga Stezhko (Belarus)
- Konstantin Soukhovetski (Ukraine)
- Alexei Sychev (Russia)
- Anastasya Terenkova (Russia)
- Matei Varga (Romania)
- David Violi (France)
- Joshua Wright (USA)
- Pavel Yeletsky (Belarus)
- Dizhou Zhao (China)
- Zhang Zuo (China)
- Darrett Zusko (Canada)

=== Final round (6 competitors) ===
Finalist	Final round concerto with Utah Symphony directed by Lawrence Leighton Smith
Yunjie Chen (China)	Chopin Piano Concerto No. 1 in E minor, Op. 11
Kotaro Fukuma (Japan)	Schumann Piano Concerto in A minor, Op. 54
Lukas Geniušas (Russia)	Rachmaninoff Piano Concerto No. 3 in D minor, Op. 30
Dmitri Levkovich (Ukraine)	Rachmaninoff Piano Concerto No. 2 in C minor, Op. 18
Serhiy Salov (Ukraine)	Brahms Piano Concerto No. 2 in B-flat major, Op. 83
Zhang Zuo (China)	Rachmaninoff Piano Concerto No. 2 in C minor, Op. 18
