= Massimiliano Frani =

Italian pianist and composer

Massimiliano Frani (10 January 1967 – 31 March 2023) was an Italian pianist, composer and music pedagogue. He founded the project MET – Music Education Therapy and was director of the Armoniæ Centro Internazionale di Musica e Cultura. He also worked as a musical art teacher at Elevations RTC, a residential treatment center in Syracuse, Utah, and lived in the state.

== Education ==
Frani began his piano education at the Conservatorio di Musica Benedetto Marcello di Venezia in Venice, graduating with honors. After his studies in literature and theatre at the Ca' Foscari University of Venice, Frani attended Brigham Young University in Provo, Utah. He earned a Master’s and Ph.D. in music, piano performance, and pedagogy. Among others, he studied with Vincenzo Pertile, Paul Pollei, and Jan Ekier.

== Performance career ==
Frani has performed with chamber music ensembles, and with orchestras in Italy, the US, Japan, Germany, Canada, and Hungary. His performances are described by critics as “spiritually resonant” and “high-class listening experience[s]”. In addition, Frani conducted orchestras in several countries and worked with several musicians including Martin Jones, Hiroko Nakamura, Alexander Peskanov and Livia Rev. In collaboration with Paul Pollei, Jeffrey Shumway, and Mack Wilberg, Frani performed for many years as part of the American Piano Quartet.

Frani competed in the Gina Bachauer International Piano Competition and the Esther Honen’s International Piano Competition and was a winner of multiple national piano competitions, including the Concorso Nazionale Pianistico Premio Venezia and the Concorso Nazionale Pianistico di Albenga. Since 1994 he was a frequent judge in international piano competitions, such as the Gina Bachauer International Piano Competition, the National Music Teachers Association Competition in Montreal and the Piano Teachers National Association Competition in Tokyo.

== Performing Arts Administrator Career ==
After graduation, Frani served in various performing arts administration capacities. Main experiences included Associate Director of the Gina Bachauer International Piano Foundation in Salt Lake City (Utah, USA); Artistic Consultant for the International Piano Academy Lake Como dedicated to Martha Argerich, and Superintendent of the Orchestra del Teatro Olimpico (Vicenza, Italy). Under Frani’s leadership each cultural organization has developed programming, outreach, and funding. During each respective assignment, each organizations achieved positive accomplishments: the Bachauer Foundation became the first piano foundation to host a 4-year cycle of international competitions; the International Piano Academy Lake Como opened its doors to the acclaimed Summer School; The Orchestra del Teatro Olimpico funded seasons which included Il Suono dell’Olimpico (including world premiere by composer Cynthia Lee Wong), productions from the Centre Chorégraphique National de Créteil et du Val-de-Marne Compagnie Käfig (Boxe Boxe & Kafig Brazil), BdT Junior Company (Coppelia), Malandin Ballet Biarritz (Romeo et Juliette), Compagnie La Baraka and Ballet National Algerien (NYA), Mimulus Cia De Dança (Dolores), Momix Dance Company (Alchemy), Ballet National de Marseille (Orfeo e Euridice). The theater also held the first co-joined opera production with the Settimane Musicali dell’Olimpico and the Società del Quartetto, with numerous concerts presented by music’s pinnacle performers.

At the time of his death, Frani taught musical arts at Elevations RTC, a residential treatment center in Syracuse, Utah, for teens ages 13–18.

== Music Pedagogy ==
Frani had given seminars and masterclasses and presented lectures at universities, music academies, and conferences throughout the world. Examples included the Park City International Chamber Music Festival (USA), the Frankfurt University of Music and Performing Arts, the International Piano Academy Lake Como (Italy), and the ASPEN Education Group (USA). He worked with internationally known pedagogues like Joseph Banowetz, Edna Golandsky, Lee Kum-Sing and Arie Vardi.

Frani was the initiator and director of the international project MET-Music Education Therapy™. Combining music pedagogy, cognitive psychology and neuropsychiatry, MET follows an interdisciplinary approach to music for premature infants.

== Compositions ==
- Brigham Young University, Provo – USA: Wind’s Waltz, Album Pianistico. ASCAP, 1736647 © USA – 2010
- Bright Line Films, Hollywood – USA: Indian Travesty, documentary. Film score. ASCAP, 1736647 © USA – 2009
- Bright Line Films, Hollywood – USA: Frank, Film. Film score. ASCAP, 1736647 © USA – 2009
- Fondazione Amici dell’Arena, Verona – Italia: Chant, opera in tre atti. ASCAP, 1736647 © USA – 2008

== Sources ==
- N. Pas: Frani, un compositore veneziano a Hollywood. In: Leggo. 05.05.2012. p. 21.
- Francesco Verni: First Hollywood then Broadway: In: Corriere della Sera. 16.02.2007. p. 13.
- Paolo Accattatis: Frani's Bravura. In: Il Gazzettino. 20.07.2002. p. 22.
