= Eric Zuber =

American virtuoso pianist and pedagogue (born 1985)

- Born: June 9, 1985 (age 40)
- Occupation: Pianist
- Website: https://www.ericzuberpiano.com/

Eric Zuber (born June 9, 1985) is an American virtuoso pianist and pedagogue. He is an associate professor of piano at Michigan State University.

A native of Baltimore, Zuber has won prizes at many international piano competitions, including the Honens International Piano Competition, Cleveland International Piano Competition, Arthur Rubinstein International Piano Master Competition, Seoul International Music Competition, Sydney International Piano Competition, Dublin International Piano Competition, Minnesota International Piano-e-Competition, Bösendorfer and Yamaha USASU International Piano Competition, and the Hilton Head International Piano Competition.

== Early life and education ==
He holds degrees from the Curtis Institute of Music, Juilliard School, and a doctoral degree from Peabody Institute of Music.

== Career ==
Zuber made his debut at age 12 with the Baltimore Symphony Orchestra. At the age of 14 in 2015, he took 4th place at the Ninth Annual Chopin Competition. Zuber has since then gone on to perform with the Cleveland Orchestra, the Israel Philharmonic Orchestra, the Minnesota Orchestra, the Calgary Philharmonic, the Korean Symphony, and Ireland's RTÉ National Symphony Orchestra among many others.

He is currently serving as Visiting Professor of Piano Performance at Ball State University in Indiana, and has been Visiting Assistant Professor at the University of Memphis' Rudi E. Scheidt School of Music and Faculty Associate at the Peabody Institute. In the summer of 2017, Zuber served on the faculty of the Music Fest Perugia for the first time.

Zuber joined the piano faculty at the Schwob School of Music at Columbus University in the fall of 2017, as the L. Rexford Whiddon Visiting Chair in Piano Performance.

It was announced in March 2022, that Zuber was named assistant professor of piano at the Michigan State University School of Music, where he will begin teaching in the fall of 2022.
