= Panayis Lyras =

- Born: Panaghis Lykiardopoulos; 1953; Greece
- Died: June 30, 2025 (aged 71) Indianapolis
- Genre: Classical music
- Occupations: Musician, professor
- Instrument: Piano
- Years active: 1963–2025

Panayis Lyras, earlier known as Panaghis Lykiardopoulos or Panayis Lykiardopoulos, is an American classical pianist.

Lyras was born in Athens, Greece, in 1953. At age six he attended the Athens Conservatoire and emigrated with his family to America in 1966. He attended the famed High School of Performing Arts in New York City and soloed in 1972 at the school's annual Concerto Concert. He played a Rachmaninoff piano concerto. He received his bachelor's and master's degrees from the Juilliard School. He is the silver medalist of the Sixth Van Cliburn International Piano Competition in 1981, the first prize winner in the Gina Bachauer, Three Rivers and University of Maryland (the now William Kapell International Competition) competitions, won the silver medal in the Arthur Rubinstein Competition in 1980 and won the third prize in the Naumburg International Piano Competition.

Among his achievements, Panayis Lyras was named recipient of the first William Petschek Piano Debut award for an outstanding graduate of the Juilliard School, an honor which carried with it a major New York recital debut at Alice Tully Hall in the Lincoln Center, the first time that renowned institution presented a graduate in a New York debut.

He has made appearances with orchestras including the Philadelphia and Minnesota Orchestras, the Buffalo and Rochester Philharmonic Orchestras, the Boston Pops, and the San Francisco, Dallas, St. Louis, Pittsburgh, Indianapolis, Baltimore, Phoenix, Florida, Omaha, New Mexico, Nashville, New Jersey, Utah, North Carolina, Hawaii, and Pacific Symphony Orchestras. Lyras' teachers included Robert Armstrong, William Masselos, Adele Marcus and Jorge Bolet. Panayis Lyras was professor of piano and artist in residence at the Michigan State University College of Music and retired in 2019. Lyras died on June 30, 2025, in Indianapolis. He was 71.
