= Richard Raymond (pianist) =

Canadian pianist (born 1965)

- Born: 1965 (age 60–61); Campbellton, New Brunswick
- Genres: Classical
- Instrument: Piano
- Labels: Analekta
- Website: richard-raymond.com

Richard Raymond (b. 1965 in Campbellton, New Brunswick) is a Canadian pianist. He has performed with the Toronto and Montreal Symphony Orchestras, but is most known for his solo chamber music recitals and recordings.

== Education ==
Raymond studied with Leon Fleisher, Marc Durand, John Perry, Lise Boucher and Antoine Reboulot. He holds a master's degree in music from Université de Montréal and an artist diploma from both the Royal Conservatory of Music of Toronto and the Peabody Conservatory of Music in Baltimore, Maryland.

== Professional career ==
=== Awards ===
In 1990, Raymond won first prize in the 18-25-year-old category of the Montreal Symphony Orchestra International Competition, as well as first prize in the Canadian International Stepping Stone Competition. In 1991 he won the grand prize in CBC Radio's National Competition for Young Performers. In 1993, he was the first Canadian to receive the Chamber Music Prize in the Van Cliburn International Piano Competition, and in 1998, he took Second Prize in the William Kapell International Piano Competition and won the Virginia Parker Prize. He has been nominated for an East Coast Music Award and an OPUS Prize.

=== Teaching ===
From 2001 until 2009, Raymond was an associate professor with the music department at McGill University in Montreal, QC. He went on to teach with the music faculty at the Montreal Conservatory of Music in 2010. Among his alumni includes Bruce Liu.

== Discography ==
- Richard Raymond (Musica Viva, 1993)
- Liszt: Piano Works (Music Viva, 1995)
- Chopin: Waltzes (Analekta, 2001)
- Reubke, Beethoven: Piano Sonatas (Analekta, 2003)
