= Arthur Greene =

American pianist and educator

- Born: New York, New York, United States
- Genres: Classical music
- Occupations: Pianist
- Instruments: Piano

Arthur Greene is an American pianist and educator.

== Career ==
Greene won gold medals at both the 1978 Gina Bachauer International Piano Competition and the William Kapell International Piano Competition. The Washington Post'' wrote "For 99 out of every 100 contestants in a competition, playing the Brahms B-flat would be a mistake. It is an enormous challenge, and is really meant to be played only by the masters. But Arthur Greene assumed the risk and won - in more ways than one. It was a virtuoso reading. But that was not what mattered most about it. For above all one was conscious throughout that here was a profound musician - one of intense concentration and seriousness of purpose."

He has performed with the Czech National Symphony, Philadelphia Orchestra, National Symphony of Ukraine, and the San Francisco, Utah, and Tokyo Symphonies. Prof. Greene has also played recitals in Carnegie Hall, Kennedy Center, Moscow Rachmaninov Hall, Tokyo Bunka Kaikan, Lisbon São Paulo Opera House, Hong Kong City Hall and concert houses in Shanghai and Beijing.

He has also recorded the Violin-Piano Sonatas of William Bolcom and the Violin-Piano Sonatas of Nikolai Roslavets on Naxos.

He is currently Faculty of the Music Department at the University of Michigan.
