= Sandra Wright Shen =

American pianist

Sandra Wright Shen (仙杜拉), a world-renowned concert pianist, was born in Taipei, Taiwan. She received her Bachelor of Music in 1994 with a piano performance major and organ minor from the Peabody Conservatory of Music, where she studied with Ann Schein. In 1996, she completed her Master of Music in piano performance and also served as an Ear-Training graduate teaching assistant to Peabody professor Clinton Adams. She has performed in master classes with Jerome Lowenthal, André Watts, Lev Nauomov, and Rebecca Penneys and studied chamber music with Earl Carlyss. Wright Shen's passion for chamber music took her to Germany and Austria during the summers of 1995–1998, where she worked with the Alban Berg Quartet, Jörg Demus, and Grant Johannesen.

Wright Shen has made guest appearances throughout the U.S. and Taiwan. Her chamber concerts have included a concert tour throughout Asia with cellist Nina Kotova and chamber concert tours in Taiwan with Vesselin Paraschkevov, former concertmaster of the Vienna Philharmonic Orchestra.

Wright Shen's activities as a piano teacher include a two-year appointment at Rollins College Community School in Winter Park, Florida from 1997 to 1999; she has also performed, taught, and given master classes at numerous schools in Taiwan. In the 2002–2003 season she hosted a Classical Radio Program for the FM 99.7 IC Radio Station. She was invited to serve on the judge panel of the National MTNA South West division piano competitions in January 2005. In addition, Wright Shen served as Piano Lecturer at the Southern Illinois University School of Music in Carbondale, Illinois for the 2004–2005 school year. She has also served on the piano faculty at the Brevard Music Center since 2006. Wright Shen is a Steinway Artist.

== Competitions ==
Wright Shen has won first place in many major piano competitions, including the 1997 Hilton Head International Piano Competition, the 1996 Mieczyslaw Munz Piano Competition, and the Taiwan National Piano Competition. She also garnered second prize in the Peabody Russell Wunderlich Piano Competition and won the Peabody Frances M. Wentz Memorial Prize in Piano.

== Recordings ==
Wright Shen's recordings include her debut CD featuring Rachmaninoff's Third Piano Concerto, recorded live, and the Saint-Saëns Carnival of the Animals, both released on Taiwan's Rock Records Music label.
