= Alec Chien =

Hong Kong pianist

Alec Chien (Chinese: 簡雅倫; pinyin: Jiǎn Yǎlún; Jyutping: Gaan2 Ngaa5leon4) is a pianist from Hong Kong.

Born in Hong Kong, Chien earned bachelor’s, master’s and doctoral degrees at Juilliard where he studied under Adele Marcus. He was prized at the II Sydney and the VIII 1982 Santander's Paloma O'Shea (4th prize). He won Gold Medal at the 1986 Gina Bachauer Competition, which led to an intercontinental concert career. Two years later he was selected by Steinway & Sons as one of 25 artists to perform at Carnegie Hall in the celebrations of the firm's 135th anniversary as well as its 500,000th piano.

Alec Chien previously served as an Artist-in-Residence, Professor of Music and Chair of the Music Department at Allegheny College as well as a lecturer at Carnegie Mellon.
