= Gina Bachauer International Piano Foundation =

Educational foundation in the United States

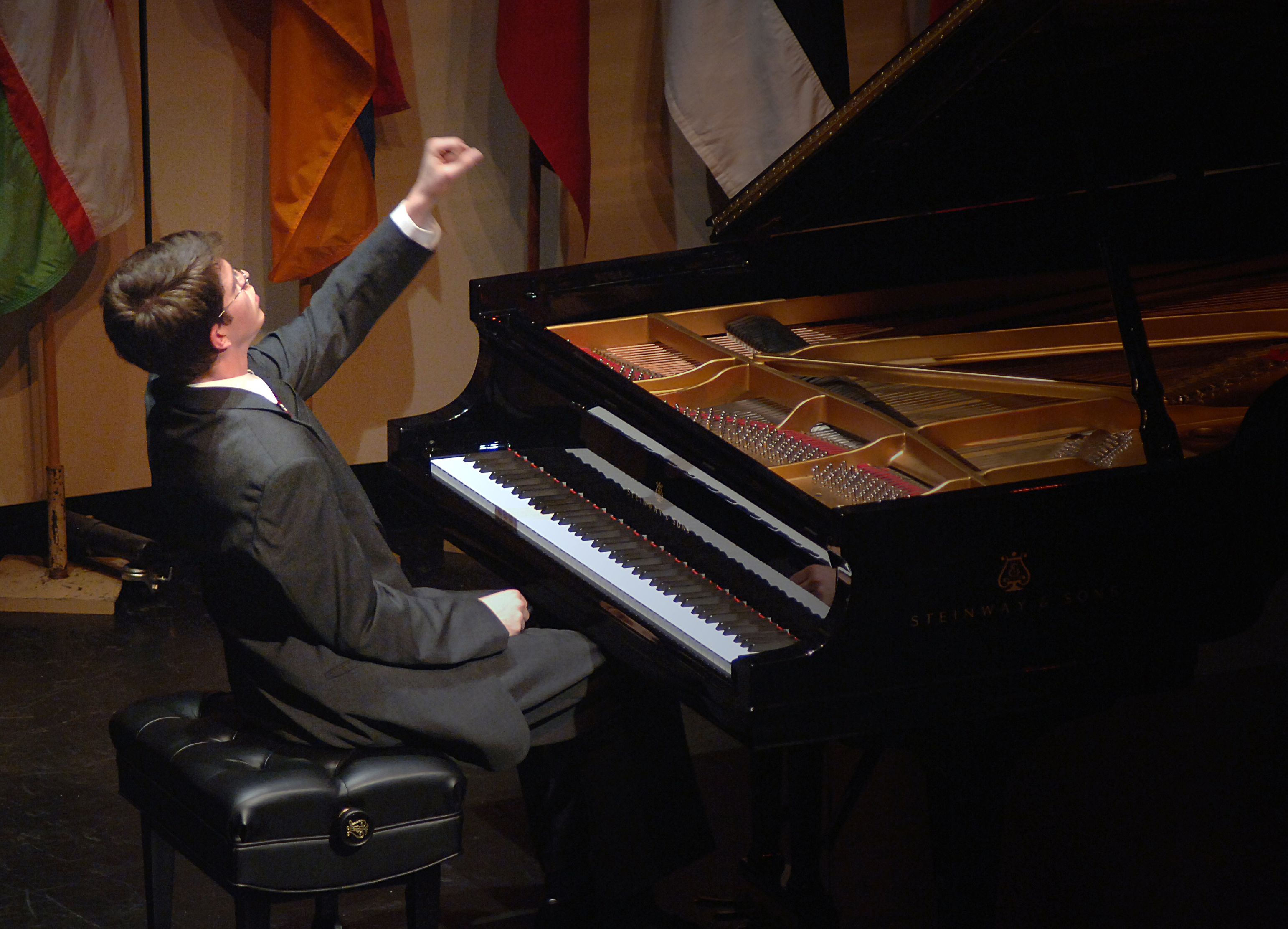
Stephen Beus performs in the 2006 Gina Bachauer International Piano Competition

The Gina Bachauer International Piano Foundation is a non-profit organization based in Salt Lake City, Utah. It is best known for its Gina Bachauer International Piano Competition, the second largest piano competition in the United States. The Foundation also hosts regular piano competitions, concerts, and festivals on a four-year cycle.

== Programs ==
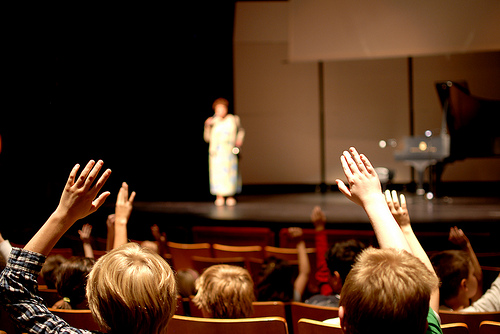
Schoolchildren participate in the Gina Bachauer International Piano Foundation's Music-in-Our-Schools program

While the Gina Bachauer International Piano Foundation also is best known for its Competition, the Foundation also hosts Festivals and a Concert Series to showcase professional pianists in a noncompetitive setting. Past Concert Series and Festival pianists include Armen Babakhanian, Stephen Beus, Reginald Robinson, Simon Tedeschi, Massimiliano Frani, and Ted Rosenthal.

The Foundation’s education outreach program Music-in-Our-Schools program exposes elementary school children to the music of visiting professional pianists. The program reaches 25,000 Utah students annually and has visited over 250,000 children since its beginning in 1999. In 2008, the Foundation was awarded a Best in State award for Excellence in Education for their Music-in-Our-Schools program.

== See also ==
- Gina Bachauer International Piano Competition
- List of Classical Music Competitions
- World Federation of International Music Competitions
- Gina Bachauer
