= Peter Kazaras =

American opera singer

- Origin: United States
- Occupations: Stage director, Artistic director and Opera singer

Peter Kazaras is an American stage director, artistic director and opera singer (tenor) from New York City.

== Career ==
Kazaras holds an undergraduate degree in government. Before his career in opera, he worked in a law firm. He served as Artistic Director for the Seattle Opera Young Artist Program from 2006 to 2013.

He is Professor of Music and Director of Opera at University of California, Los Angeles.

== Education ==
- Riverdale Country School, Bronx, New York, 1969
- New York University School of Law, 1977

== Opera ==
=== Operas staged ===
Opera	Place
Cendrillon	Juilliard School
An American Dream	Seattle Opera
La bohème	Los Angeles Opera
The Thieving Magpie	Glimmerglass Festival
Le nozze di Figaro	Washington National Opera
Der Ring des Polykrates	Dallas Opera
The Turn of the Screw	Seattle Opera
Mansfield Park	Opera UCLA
The Ghosts of Versailles	Chautauqua Opera

=== Operatic roles ===
- Loge, Der Ring des Nibelungen
- Erik, Der fliegende Holländer
- Monsieur Grivet, Thérèse Raquin (2001 premiere cast)
- Pelegrin, New Year (1989 premiere cast)
- François, A Quiet Place (1983 premiere cast)

== Competition jury member ==
- José Iturbi International Music Competition (2010)
- Marilyn Horne Song Competition

== Filmography ==
- The Ghosts of Versailles (Brian Large, 1992)
