= Bakitone International =

Bakitone International is a non-profit organization based in Athens, Greece that maintains a network of almost 1000 international classical music competitions around the world. Bakitone International represents interests of European Broadcasting Union members at the international level in the field of classical music since 2010. It was founded in 2008 as a promotional agency for musicians in order to assist them in selecting from the database of music competitions and master-classes to achieve their career goals.

In 2009 Bakitone International has opened branches in Moscow, Russia, Shanghai, China and Los Angeles, USA. The organization has quickly earned international acclaim amongst young artists, as well as famous musicians, such as Vladimir Ashkenazy, Daniel Pollack and Yuri Bashmet. In 2009 Bakitone was featured on TV Kultura channel and Newsland channel in Russia, dedicated to classical music and arts. In 2010 the organization published a magazine in Russia featuring interviews with Daniel Pollack and Yuri Bashmet.

In September 2010, Bakitone International has established a special award for the best performance at The Muse International Piano Competition in Athens, Greece. The Prize was awarded to a 5-year old prodigy violinist Dunja Kalamir from Serbia.
