= Michail Lifits =

German pianist

Michail Lifits (born 1982) is a prizewinning German concert pianist who was born into a family of musicians in Tashkent, Uzbekistan.

== Biography ==
He studied at the Hochschule für Musik und Theater in Hanover under Bernd Goetzke and Karl-Heinz Kämmerling, and at the Incontri col Maestro Academy in Imola, Italy, under Boris Petrushansky. In 2009, he won first prize at the 2009 Hilton Head International Piano Competition in South Carolina and at the Ferruccio Busoni International Piano Competition in Bolzano, Italy. He was also a semi-finalist at the 2009 Van Cliburn International Piano Competition in Fort Worth, Texas.

Lifits has played at many prestigious venues including Carnegie Hall in New York, Salle Cortot in Paris, Wigmore Hall in London and the Tonhalle in Zurich.
