= Duane Hulbert =

American pianist

Duane Hulbert is a Grammy-nominated American pianist.

Hulbert received the Gold Medal at the 1980 Gina Bachauer International Piano Competition, and also won prizes in the 1981 Leeds Competition and 1985 Carnegie Hall International American Music Competition.

He has performed as a soloist with symphonies across the United States and has given recitals at Merkin Hall in New York, Kennedy Center in Washington, D.C., and Benaroya Hall in Seattle.

In 2002, his recording of the piano works of late-romantic Russian composer Alexander Glazunov was nominated for a Grammy Award for Best Solo Instrumental Recording. David Hurwitz of ClassicsToday.com called the CD “a production that makes the best possible case for this really excellent but sadly neglected repertoire.”

Hulbert was Professor and Head of the Piano Department at the University of Puget Sound for 30 years before retiring in 2016.
