= Nazareno Ferruggio =

Italian pianist

Nazareno Ferruggio (born 1981 in Bari) is an Italian pianist.

== Biography ==
Nazareno Ferruggio graduated from Pierluigi Camicia's classes with full marks, honours and distinction at the Niccolò Piccinni State Conservatory of Music in Bari. After completing a postgraduate course at the Musikhochschule Mannheim, Germany in Ragna Schirmer's class, he finished his studies in the Musikhochschule Bern, Switzerland, with Rada Petkova. He also attended masterclasses with prestigious teachers such as J. Achucarro, K. H. Kaemmerling and Jerome Lowenthal, J. Soriano, and O. Yablonskaya.

He has performed in all the continents of the world. Lately did concerts tour in South Africa.

He debuted as a soloist with the Bari Symphonic Orchestra, performing Beethoven's Fantasy for Choir and Orchestra, conducted by Nicola Scardicchio. He has won eighteen first prizes in national and international competitions. In 2005, he won the prestigious IBLA International Competition Grand Prize with best prize for Claude Debussy's pieces.

He had his American debut in 2006 at Carnegie Hall in New York and also performed concerts in Little Rock, Arkansas. In 2007, he received the Liszt Special Prize at the 8th Grieg International Piano Competition in Oslo, Norway. He also toured extensively in Indonesia, where he taught masterclasses and performed recitals in Jakarta and Surabaya. In 2008, he had his Austrian debut at the Mozarteum University in Salzburg, Austria, and won a Rotary Scholarship at the Pianale Academy in Fulda, Germany. In 2009, he won first prize at the international piano competition Premio Valentino. He was a semifinalist at the 15th Gina Bachauer Piano Competition, which ran from June 16 to July 1, 2010, in Salt Lake City, Utah.

== Performances ==
He has performed in concert halls like Carnegie Hall, Lindemann Hall, Cheong Ju Arts Centre, Rosengarten, Palau de la Musica, Auditorium de Leon, Rose Wagner Performing Arts Center, Teatru Manoel, Teatro Municipal (Lima), Conservatori Municipal de Musica de Barcelona, Palacio de Bellas Artes, Auditorium Parco della Musica, Casa della Musica, Altes Rathaus Barock Saal, Atterbury Theatre.

He has performed in New York, London, Singapore, Yangon, Budapest, Mexico City, Sydney, Melbourne, Jakarta, Oslo, Munich, Copenhagen, Stockholm, La Valletta, Milan, Lima, Barcelona, Innsbruck, Venice, Hong Kong, Rome, Cheong Ju, Hamamatsu, Little Rock, Cologne, Geneva, Amsterdam, Guatemala, Paris, Pretoria, Durban, Mannheim, Berne, Dublin Hugh Lane Gallery, Bari.

He was invited to play at the following music festivals: Sommets du Classique, International Spring Festival, Cantiere Internazionale di Musica Contemporanea, Festival della Musica Contemporanea, Ascoli Piceno Festival, Festival Liszt in Milan, Raices 2015 Mexico City, Perla Baroku and Valletta Baroque Festiva, Dam Festival Pristina Kosovo.

He has been a soloist with ICO Orchestra Provincia di Bari, ICO Orchestra della Magna Grecia, Malta Philharmonic Orchestra, and Orquestra Sinfonica de Michoacan MAV Orchestra Budapest. He performed piano concertos with conductors like Nicola Scardicchio, Brian Schembri, Karl Martin, Hakan Sensoy, Claudio Morbo, and Gordon Campbell.

== Other ==
He is also a visiting professor at the University of Suwon in South of Korea, the Norwegian Academy of Music, Escuela Superior de musica in Mexico City, Academy of Ars in Novi Sad, University of Music in Stuttgart, University of Music in Utrecht, and Conservatorio Superior de Castellon.

He is father of two sons.

== Discography ==
- 2012 - Theme et Variations - music by Scarlatti, Franck, Rachmaninov, Martin - Wide Classique Label
- 2014 - Live in Barcelona - music by Scarlatti, Bach, Mozart, Liszt, Chopin, Satie - Wide Classique Label
- 2016 - Live in London - music by Tartini, Mozart, Beethoven, Ysaye, Gianzini - Wide Classique Label
