= Hilton Head International Piano Competition =

The Hilton Head International Piano Competition is a piano competition held annually since 1996 at Hilton Head Island, South Carolina's First Presbyterian Church.

== Selected list of jurors ==
- (United States) Joseph Banowetz
- (Brazil) José Feghali
- (Hungary) (United Kingdom) Peter Frankl
- (Croatia) (United States) Kemal Gekić
- (United States) John Giordano
- (Uruguay) (United States) Enrique Graf
- (United Kingdom) Ian Hobson
- (Australia) (United Kingdom) Leslie Howard
- (United States) Jerome Lowenthal
- (France) Dominique Merlet
- (Republic of Ireland) John O'Conor
- (Poland) Piotr Paleczny
- (United States) Daniel Pollack
- (Germany) (Israel) Menahem Pressler
- (United States) Jerome Rose
- (United States) Ann Schein Carlyss
- (France) Andre-Michel Schub
- (United States) Christopher Taylor
- (United Kingdom) (Canada) Valerie Tryon
- (Israel) Arie Vardi
- (Russia) Mikhail Voskresensky
- (United States) Janice Weber

== Prize winners ==
Year	First prize	Second prize	Third prize	Other Main Prizes
1996	(United States) Heather Conner	(United States) Steven Spooner (ex-aequo) Charles Hulin (ex-aequo)		
1997	(United States) Sandra Wright Shen	(Spain) José Ramón Méndez	(Brazil) Derison Duarte	
1999	(South Korea) Min-Soo Sohn	(Lithuania) Gabrieilius Alekna	(Hong Kong) Kinwai Shum	
2000	(South Africa) Petronel Malan	(Vietnam) Cuong Hung Van	(Bulgaria) Georgi Slavchev	
2001	(Georgia (country)) Edisher Savitski	(Belarus) Yuri Blinov	(South Korea) Hea Jung Cho	
2002	(Russia) Konstantin Soukhovetski	(United States) Dustin Gledhill	(South Korea) Esther Jung-A Park	
2003	(China) Chu-Fang Huang	(United States) Sean Kennard	(Canada) Jean-François Latour	
2004	(Vietnam) Andrew Le	(China) Hong Xu	(United States) Elizabeth Schumann	
2005	(China) Di Wu	(China) Chen-Xin Xu	(Canada) Ryo Yanagitani	
2006	(Ukraine) Dmitri Levkovich	(China) Diyi Tang	(Russia) Daniil Sayamov	
2007	(United States) Eric Zuber	(Ukraine) (Australia) Alexey Koltakov	(United States) Charlie Albright	
2008	(Israel) Ran Dank	(Georgia (country)) (United States) Yelena Beriyeva	(Japan) Takashi Yamamoto	(Australia) Hoang Pham (Russia) Daria Rabotkina (South Korea) Young-Ah Tak
2009	(Uzbekistan) (Germany) Michail Lifits	(United States) Chetan Tierra	(Morocco) (Hungary) Marouan Benabdallah	(Azerbaijan) (Israel) Michael Bukhman (China) Yunjie Chen (United States) Wei-Jen Yuan
2010	(Czech Republic) Lukáš Vondráček	(Russia) Ilya Maximov	(Japan) Rina Sudo	(Italy) Angelo Arciglione (Russia) Elmar Gasanov (Russia) Vladimir Khomyakov
2011	(China) Zhu Wang	(United States) Drew Petersen	(China) Jin-Hong Li	(Singapore) Kate Liu (United States) Micah McLaurin (China) Ruixue Zhang
2012	(South Korea) Jin Uk Kim	(Hong Kong) Wai Yin Wong	(United States) Steven Lin	(China) Fei-Fei Dong (United States) Alexei Tartakovski (United States) Andrew Tyson
2013	(Italy) Leonardo Colafelice	(South Korea) Jinhyung Park	(Canada) Tony Yike Yang	(South Korea) Saeyoon Chon (China) Yiou Li
2014	(China) Shen Lu	(Germany) Miao Huang	(South Korea) EunAe Lee	(Algeria) Mehdi Ghazi (China) Brian Yeubing Lin (United States) Anastasiya Naplekova
2015	(United States) Elliot Wuu	(China) Xiaoxuan Li	(United States) Elizabeth Tsai	(Singapore) Tommy Jing Yu Leo (Russia) Elizaveta Kliuchereva
2016	(South Korea) Chang-Yong Shin	(Canada) Tristan Teo	(South Korea) SaeYoon Chon	(Spain) Albert Cano Smit (South Korea) Hee-Jun Han (United States) Reed Tetzloff
2017	(Japan) (United States) Ray Ushikubo	(United States) Andrew Li	(Canada) Jaeden Izik-Dzurko	(Canada) Arthur Wang (Hong Kong) (Macau) Hoi Leong Cheong
2019	(South Korea) Chaeyoung Park	(Poland) Jakub Kuszlik	(United States) Anna Han	(Taiwan) Yi-Yang Chen (Japan) Arisa Onoda (China) Yuchong Wu
2020	(Canada) Kevin Chen	(Russia) Pyotr Akulov	(United States) Tyler Kim	(Japan) Ryunosuke Kishimoto (United States) Kasey Shao
2022	(Canada) Jaeden Izik-Dzurko	(Ukraine) Illia Ovcharenko	(South Korea) Seongwoo Moon	(China) Yuzhang Li (United States) Antony Ratinov (China) Yinuo Wang
