= Gina Bachauer =

Greek pianist (1913–1976)

- Τζίνα Μπαχάουερ
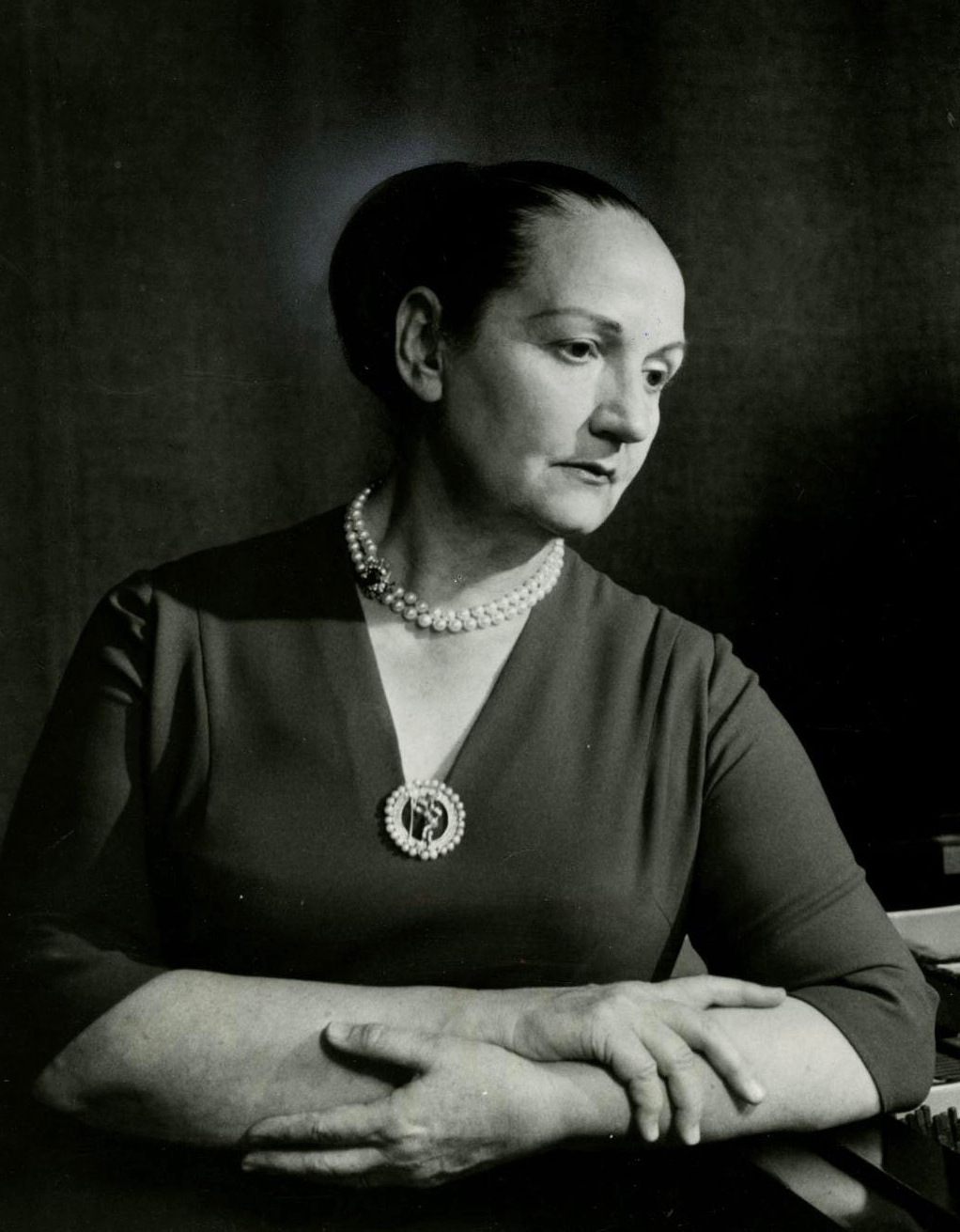
- Bachauer in 1971
- Born: 21 May 1913; Athens, Greece
- Died: 22 August 1976 (aged 63); Athens, Greece
- Education: Athens Conservatory
- Occupation: Classical pianist

Gina Bachauer (Greek: Τζίνα Μπαχάουερ; 21 May 1913 – 22 August 1976) was a Greek classical pianist who toured extensively in the United States and Europe. Interested in piano at a young age, Bachauer graduated from the Athens Conservatory and studied under Alfred Cortot and Sergei Rachmaninoff. She is best known for playing Romantic piano concertos. She played hundreds of concerts for the Allied troops in the Middle East during World War II while she lived in Egypt. She spent a lot of time touring the United States and Europe, giving over 100 concerts each year. Bachauer also recorded extensively, both as a soloist and with orchestras. She received an honorary doctorate from the University of Utah. During her career she was called the "queen of pianists". The Gina Bachauer International Piano Foundation was named in honor of her contributions to the musical world. In her personal life, Bachauer married music conductor Alec Sherman, who became her manager. She died at the age of 63 at the Athens Festival.

== Biography ==
Gina Bachauer was born in Athens, Greece in a Jewish family. She was interested in the piano from a young age; she gave her first recital as a child in her hometown of Athens. She graduated from the Athens Conservatory in 1929. She gained further piano instruction from Alfred Cortot and Sergei Rachmaninoff. Her studies under Rachmaninoff involved trailing him around the world, requesting lessons even as he toured. Her debut performance with an orchestra was in 1932. She had three "debuts" before her career truly took off. Her first debut was interrupted by her father's financial problems; she returned to Greece to work for her family. Her next debut was interrupted by World War II, but she continued playing, practicing, and looking for opportunities. She gave hundreds of concerts all over the world by the end of her career. Bachauer played a wide range of music but was most known for her performances of Romantic piano concertos.

She married Alec Sherman after playing with the New London Orchestra under his direction. Sherman left his conducting career to become Bachauer's manager. She died in 1976 of a heart attack at the Athens Festival, on the day she was to appear as a soloist with the National Symphony Orchestra of Washington, D.C.

== Career ==
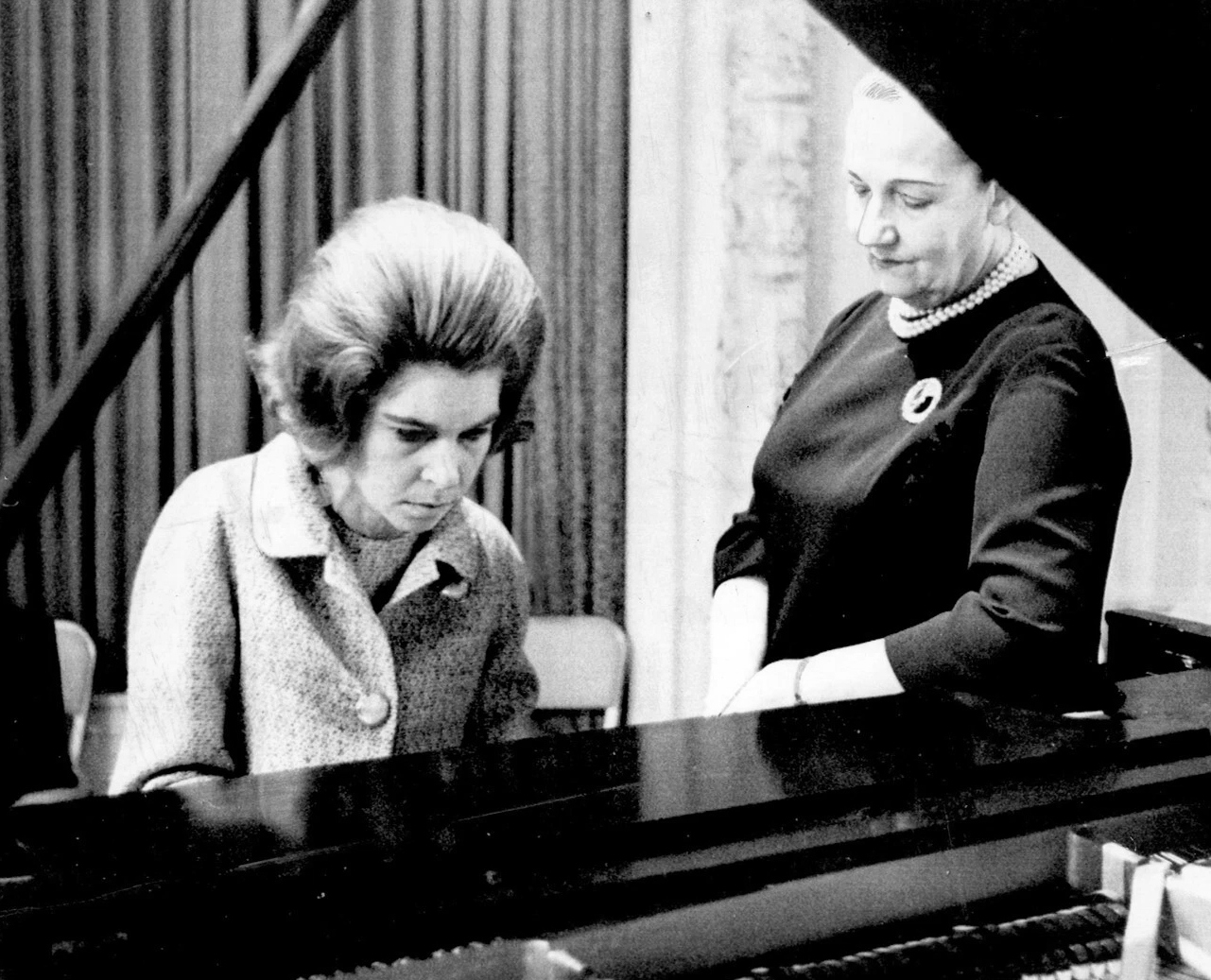
Bachauer with Princess Irene in 1969

External audio
- You may hear Gina Bachauer with Stanislaw Skrowaczewski and the London Symphony Orchestra playing Johannes Brahms' Piano Concerto No. 2 in B flat major, Op. 83 in 1962; Here on archive.org

Bachauer toured the American and European continents throughout her career, giving over 100 concerts each year. She would travel and perform eleven months out of the year. In 1965, she had done 14 coast-to-coast tours of the United States. She performed solo recitals in addition to her performances with orchestras. She received critical acclaim for her work and was called the "queen of pianists" during her busy career. After her studies under Cortot and Rachmaninoff, she toured Italy, Yugoslavia, Greece, and Egypt, but the outbreak of World War II stranded her in Cairo. There, she gave concerts to troops in the area, expanding her repertoire beyond classical music for a time because it bored the troops. She considered her 1935 performance with the Athens Symphony Orchestra as her true debut, as it launched her career more than any of her previous performances. In 1955, she performed in the Herodes Atticus Theatre before King Paul and Queen Frederika. She was the first solo pianist to do so. She debuted in the United States in 1950 and, despite a low turnout, received positive reviews.

Recording music was also a significant part of Bachauer's career. She recorded for the His Master's Voice, RCA Victor, and Mercury labels. She did recordings with orchestras and released her own solo albums.

During her three decades as the "queen of pianists", Bachauer took time to support young pianists by listening to them perform and offering her advice. In 1973, she took a short break from touring to judge the American Music Scholarship Association Piano Competition and worked with the students who competed.

Bachauer was also the piano teacher of Princess Irene and gave piano lessons to King Paul. Princess Irene performed with Bachauer on some of her tours in the United States, including concerts in Salt Lake City, Seattle, Cincinnati, and Dallas. The Dallas Symphony Orchestra reached out to Bachauer in 1971 when they were experiencing financial difficulty. In response, Bachauer brought Princess Irene to perform a two-piano concerto with her as part of a Dallas Symphony Orchestra program. The novelty of a Greek princess combined with the popularity of Bachauer brought in a huge audience, as well as $100,000 for the struggling orchestra.

Bachauer was a close friend of Maurice Abravanel and often appeared with the Utah Symphony Orchestra. She was considered an honorary citizen of Utah and held an honorary doctorate of music from the University of Utah. The Gina Bachauer International Piano foundation is based in Salt Lake City. She also frequently played with the London Philharmonic and the BBC Orchestra.

== Legacy ==
The Gina Bachauer International Piano Foundation's programs include educational outreach and prestigious competitions. The Gina Bachauer International Piano Competition was established in 1976 in her honor. It attracts young pianists worldwide to Salt Lake City each year. As of 1997, the house in which Bachauer lived in Halandri stood empty, though it was still taken care of, along with the stray cats that Bachauer fed when she was alive, by friends and neighbors.

In 1981, the Greek Post issued a stamp in Bachauer's honor. She is considered one of the greatest pianists of the 20th century.

== Works cited ==
- Wade, Graham (1999). Gina Bachauer - A Pianist's Odyssey. Yorkshire: GRM Publications. ISBN 1901148033.
- Allred, Nancy Carol (1999). Gina Bachauer: Her Performance Career, A Study of Her Repertoire in Concert and Recording. Kansas City, Missouri. ISBN 9780599299979.
