= Thomas & Evon Cooper International Competition =

The Thomas & Evon Cooper International Competition (also known simply as the Cooper International Competition) is a piano and violin competition held annually at the Oberlin College in Oberlin, Ohio, and is one of the most prestigious competitions for young musicians in the world. It is sponsored by Thomas and Evon Cooper and is presented jointly by the Oberlin Conservatory of Music and the Cleveland Orchestra. The competition is for young musicians 13–18 years of age and awards more than $35,000 in prize money, with a first prize of $20,000. The competition gives three finalists the opportunity to play a complete concerto with the Cleveland Orchestra. The competition debuted in the summer of 2010 with a piano competition, followed by a violin competition in 2011, and the competition alternates annually between both instruments. George Li won the first prize in the first piano competition and Sirena Huang won first in the first violin competition.

== History ==
The competition originated as the Oberlin International Festival, first organized by Emeritus Professor Joseph Schwartz in 1985. In 1995, Professor Robert Shannon became the director and the first annual Oberlin International Piano Competition was launched. In 1999, Yeol Eum Son won 1st prize. By the time of its final edition, it gave the winners opportunities to perform with leading orchestras in China, such as the Shanghai Philharmonic. In 2009, the competition was not held due to renovations of the concert hall. In 2010, a new competition named after sponsors Thomas and Evon Cooper replaced it. Since then, the competition holds its final rounds with the Cleveland Orchestra in Severance Hall. In 2016, the competition doubled its prizes to a $20,000 first prize.

== Prize winners ==
=== Thomas & Evon Cooper International Competition (2010-present) ===
Year	1st prize	2nd prize	3rd prize	4th prize	5th prize	6th prize	7th prize
2010 (piano)	(United States) George Li	(United States) John Chen	(United States) Kate Liu	(United States) Sahun Hong	(United States) Anna Han	(Canada) Tristan Teo	
2011 (violin)	(United States) Sirena Huang	(United States) Alexandra Switala	(United States) Laura Park	(Japan) Mayumi Kanagawa	(Bulgaria) Gergana Haralampieva	(Japan) Kelly Talim	
2012 (piano)	(Italy) Leonardo Colafelice	(Canada) Bruce Liu	(United States) Micah McLaurin	(United States) Sahun Hong (Canada) Annie Zhou	not awarded	(United States) Sarina Zhang	
2013 (violin)	(Taiwan) William Ching-Yi Wei (South Korea) Kyumin Park	(China) Ming Liu	not awarded	(United States) Gallia Kastner	(China) Jieming Tang	(United States) Angela Wee	
2014 (piano)	(Canada) Tony Yike Yang	(China) Zitong Wang	(South Korea) Saeyoon Chon	(South Korea) Gyu Tae Ha	(United States) Evren Ozel	(South Korea) Min Jun Lee	
2015 (violin)	(United States) Gallia Kastner (Taiwan) Belle Ting	(United States) Joshua Brown	not awarded	(United States) Karisa Chiu	(Canada) Alice Lee	(United States) Maya Buchanan	
2016 (piano)	(Japan) Ryota Yamazaki	(United States) Evren Ozel	(United States) Nathan H. Lee	(South Korea) Chaewon Kim	(United States) Andrew Li	(United States) Clayton Stephenson	
2017 (violin)	(Sweden) Johan Dalene	(United States) Christina Jihee Nam (United States) Qing Yu Chen	not awarded	(United States) Zachary Brandon	(United States) Maya Anjali Buchanan	(United States) Kiarra Saito-Beckman	
2018 (piano)	(Canada) Tony Siqi Yun	(Taiwan) Kai-Min Chang	(South Korea) Yunchan Lim	(Canada) Ryan Zhu	(United States) William Chen	(United States) William Yang	
2019 (violin)	(United States) Eric Charles Chen	(China) Shihan Wang	(United States) Isabella Brown	(China) Jin Yucheng	(China) Yiyang Hou	(United States) (Canada) Enrique Rodrigues	
2022 (violin)	(South Korea) Seohyun Kim	(United States) Sameer Agrawal	(United States) Calvin Alexander	(United States) Audrey Goodner	(United States) Bianca Ciubancan	(United States) Kento Hong	
2023 (piano)	Pyotr Akulov (Canada) Sophia Liu	not awarded	(United States) Taige Wang	(China) Yanyan Bao	(Canada) Andrew Sijie Li	(South Korea) Seoeun Lee	Filip Trifu

=== Oberlin International Piano Competition (1995-2008) ===
Year	1st Prize	2nd Prize	3rd Prize	4th Prize	5th Prize	6th Prize
1995		Gloria Chien				
1996						
1997						
1998	Hyo-Sun Lim					
1999	Yeol Eum Son	Marko Pavlovic				
2000	Ying Li	Tian Tian	Esther Park			
2001	Darret Zusko	Eun Taek Kim Ji Yeon Shin				
2002	Jung Lim Kim	Jeanette Fang	Martin Leung			
2003	Rachel Naomi Kudo	Kevin Kordi	Ye Jin Lee	Sarah Oh	Kei Neidra	
2004	Wang Da	Sejoon Park	Sun-A Park	Kei Neidra Hyo Kyun Shin	Ying Cheng Yang	
2005	Ruoyu Huang	Sun-A Park	Fangzhou Feng	Hanmo Qian	Vicki Ning Wang	
2006	Rui (Ellen) Wang					
2007	Yuqing Meng	Minsoo Hong	Yunqing Zhou	Xiao Pei Xu	Chai Yu Jen	John Choi
2008	Junle Li	George Fu	Wanting Zhao	Eunjin Bang	Jae Young Kim	Dong June Kim
