= Steven Spooner =

American pianist (born 1970)

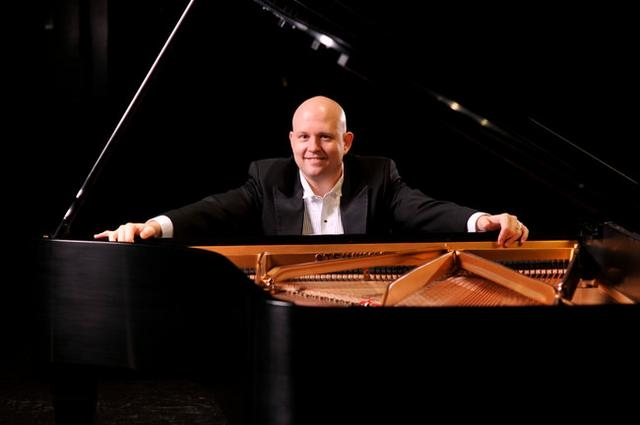
- Steven Spooner (2010)
- Born: Steven Craig Spooner; February 3, 1970 (age 56)
- Occupation: Classical pianist
- Website: www.stevenspooner.com

Steven Spooner (born 1970) is an American pianist, and currently Professor of Piano at the Peabody Institute in Baltimore, Maryland.

== Biography ==
As a performing artist, Spooner has given solo recitals at such major venues as Carnegie Hall, Muziekcentrum Vredenburg in Utrecht, the Salle Cortot in Paris, Budapest's Great Hall of the Liszt Academy, Geneva's Fête de la Musique and numerous other halls across Europe, Latin America, South America, Asia, and the United States. Spooner has recently completed an enormous recital series comparable to Anton Rubinstein's historic recitals of 1885. These concerts consisted of seventeen solo piano recitals embracing much of the standard piano literature from the Baroque to composers of the 21st century. Spooner is also an active chamber collaborator and has performed with a diverse and distinguished list of vocalists and instrumentalists including, Silk Road Ensemble's Bassist Daxun Zhang, former Philadelphia Orchestra Trombonist, M. Dee Stewart, and prize-winning violinist Leor Maltinsky. Spooner's orchestral engagements include performances with the Danubia Symphony Orchestra, Brevard Symphony Orchestra, Crescent City Symphony, New Orleans Civic Symphony, Ozark Chamber Orchestra, and recent performances with the Chamber Orchestra Kremlin during their recent tour of North America. Spooner is a Steinway Artist.

== Education ==
Spooner began his piano studies at the age of nine and made his public debut at age fourteen. He continued his education at Loyola University New Orleans, the Paris Conservatory, the Moscow Conservatory and Tbilisi State Conservatoire, both in the former Soviet Union, and Indiana University. Spooner has studied with such distinguished artists as Karen Shaw, Nodar Gabunia, Edmund Battersby, Logan Skelton, Noël Lee, Emile Naoumoff, and Earl Wild and performed in master classes given by Martha Argerich, Gary Graffman, György Sándor, Tatiana Nikolayeva, and Grant Johannesen.

== Awards ==
Spooner has been the recipient of many awards. In 1994, in his first international competition and although he was the youngest contestant, he obtained the Jury Prize at New Orleans International Piano Competition. In 1996 he was awarded First Prize and recipient of the Niekamp Career Grant as the most outstanding pianist in French music at the Paris Conservatory and second prize at the Hilton Head International Piano Competition. Spooner took fifth prize at the Artlivre International Piano Competition and was one of four international fellows of the Barnett Foundation, both in 2001. Spooner's performance at the 1999 International Franz Liszt Piano Competition resulted in several return invitations to the Netherlands. Russian piano legend and Moscow Conservatory Professor Victor Merzhanov commented, "His performances possess the deep understanding of the contents of Liszt's works, organic and instinctive feeling of form and outstanding virtuosity. The crystal-clear enunciation of each tone and the feeling of phrasal climaxes and structure are also worth mentioning. His pianistic art must attract more attention from concert organizers around the world." In 2008 he was added to the international roster of Steinway Artists and was also the winner of the 2008 Ivory Classics Grant for apprenticeship with Earl Wild.

== Recordings ==
- DVD, Steven Spooner Plays Liszt. EMR Classics, 2010
- Historical Piano Recital Series Vol. I. EMR Classics, 2010
- Historical Piano Recital Series Vol. III. EMR Classics, 2010
- Historical Piano Recital Series Vol. IV. EMR Classics, 2010
- Steven Spooner Plays Liszt Live. EMR Classics, 2009
- Historical Piano Recital Series Vol. II. EMR Classics, 2008
- III. Don Quixote, Strauss/Stewart/Spooner. IU Music, 2001
- Steven Spooner Plays Schubert and Liszt Transcriptions. EMR Classics, 1999

== In the news ==
- "Enhancements Put Works in Context at Three-Day Liszt Festival" The Washington Post (June 2, 2008)
- "Piano Professor to Study with Renowned Pianist" KU News (May 1, 2008)
- "Piano Professor Named as a Steinway Artist" KU News (May 1, 2008)
- "KU Professor Selected for International Liszt Performance" KU News (November 16, 2009)
- "Spooner Picked for Prestigious International Liszt Festival" The Oread (January 19, 2009)
