= Bruce Liu =

Canadian pianist (born 1997)

- 刘晓禹
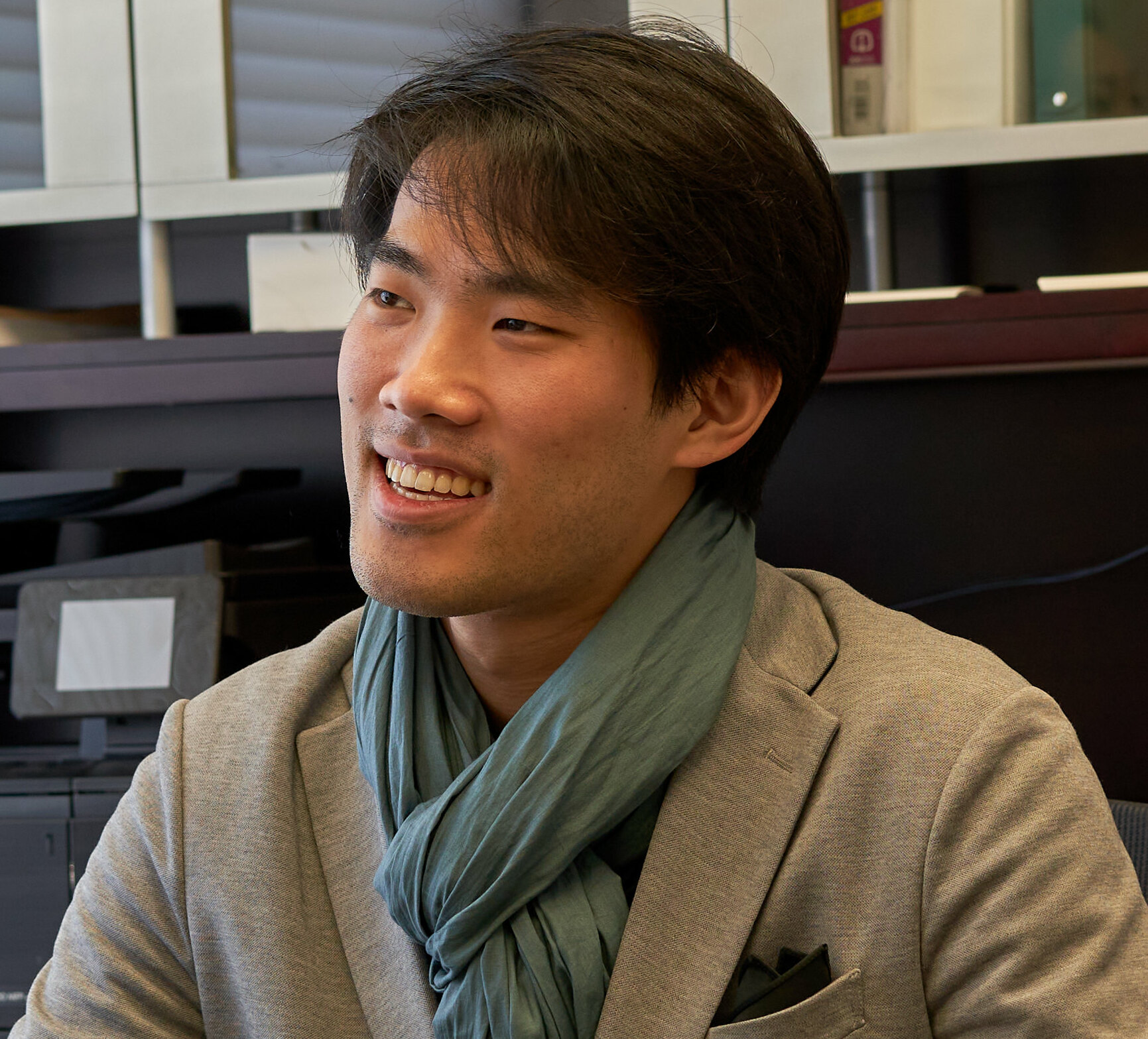
- Liu in 2022
- Born: Xiaoyu Liu; May 8, 1997 (age 29); Paris, France
- Occupation: Classical pianist
- Awards: (gold) First Prize, XVIII International Chopin Piano Competition (2021)

Chinese name
- Traditional Chinese: 劉曉禹
- Simplified Chinese: 刘晓禹
Transcriptions
Standard Mandarin
- Hanyu Pinyin: Liú Xiǎoyǔ
- Website: bruce-liu.com

Bruce Liu (simplified Chinese: 刘晓禹; traditional Chinese: 劉曉禹; pinyin: Liú Xiǎoyǔ; born Xiaoyu Liu on May 8, 1997) is a Canadian pianist. Born in Paris and raised in Montreal, he began to play the piano at eight years old and was performing by age 11. In 2021, he rose to widespread renown after winning the XVIII International Chopin Piano Competition.

== Early life and education ==
Liu was born in Paris to Chinese parents from Beijing. At age 6, he moved to Montreal, Canada, with his father. He initially started piano studies on an electric keyboard but progressed to an upright piano once he became more serious. He graduated from the Montreal Conservatory of Music, where he was classmates with Richard Raymond. He has since been studying with Đặng Thái Sơn at the Université de Montréal.

== Career ==
=== 2012–2021: Early career ===
At age 15, Liu performed with the Cleveland Orchestra and Jahja Ling at Severance Hall. In the following years, he collaborated with many leading ensembles, such as the Israel Philharmonic Orchestra, Montreal Symphony Orchestra, and the Orchestra of the Americas. He also toured North America with the NCPA Orchestra, and China twice, with the National Symphony Orchestra of Ukraine and with the Lviv National Philharmonic.

In 2012, Liu won the Grand Prize at the Orchestre Symphonique de Montréal Standard Life Competition. Recipient of the 2015 Prix d'Europe, he was awarded major prizes at the Thomas & Evon Cooper International Competition in 2012 and the Sendai International Music Competition in 2016. He was also a finalist of the Montreal International Music Competition and the Arthur Rubinstein International Piano Master Competition in Tel Aviv. In 2019, he participated in the XVI International Tchaikovsky Competition.

=== 2021–present: Breakthrough and debut album ===
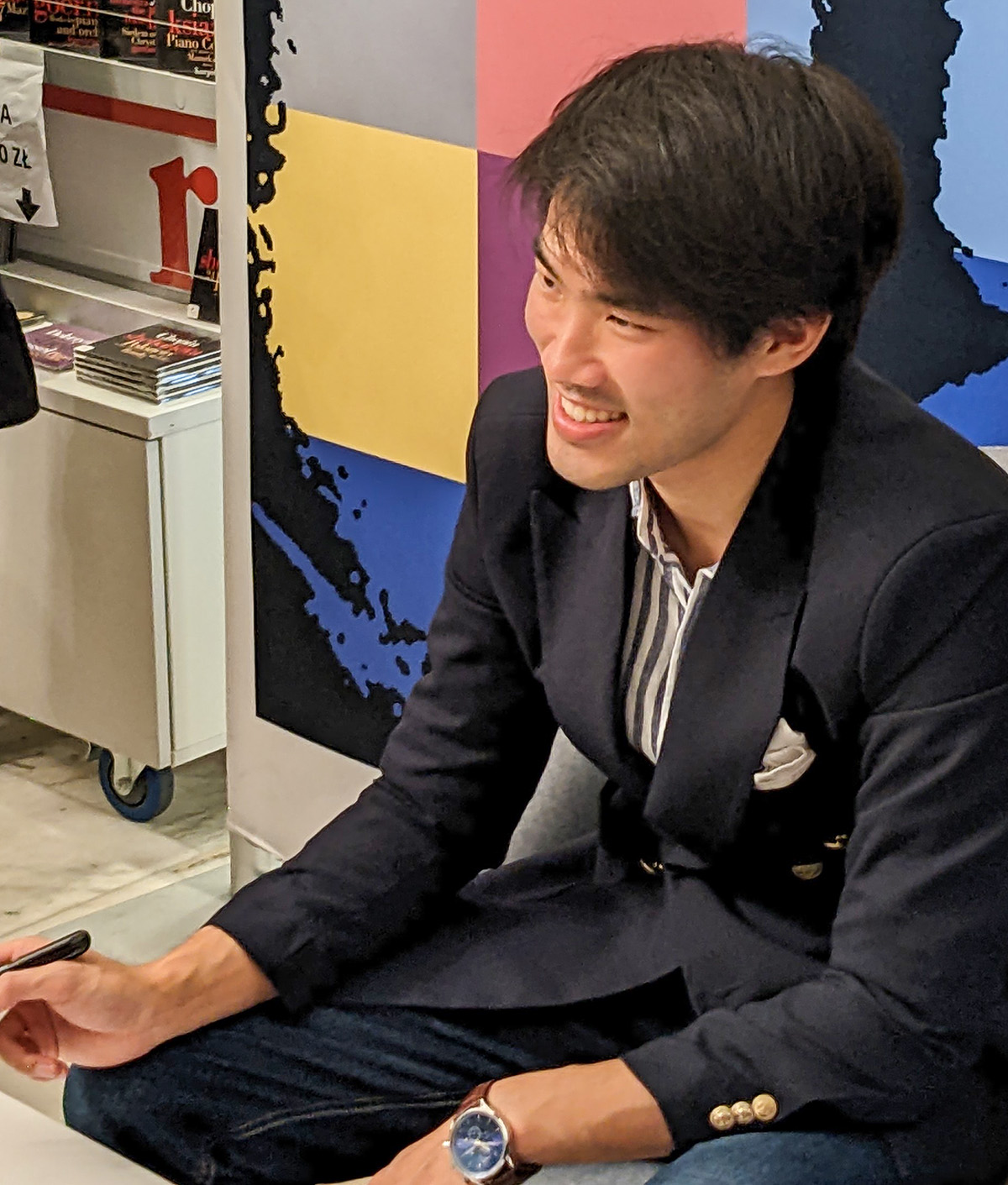
Liu at the Chopin and His Europe Festival in 2022

In 2021, Liu won the XVIII International Chopin Piano Competition in Warsaw. He scored the highest marks in the first three stages and was the only competitor the jury unanimously selected to progress from each round. He was also the clear audience favourite and received a prolonged standing ovation for his final round performance of Chopin's Piano Concerto No. 1 with the Warsaw Philharmonic Orchestra under Andrey Boreyko.

Shortly thereafter, Liu embarked on a world tour, including performances with the NHK Symphony Orchestra, Seoul Philharmonic Orchestra, Polish National Radio Symphony Orchestra, Orchestre Philharmonique du Luxembourg, NFM Wrocław Philharmonic, and the Orquestra Sinfônica Brasileira. In recital, he appeared at the Théâtre des Champs-Elysées in Paris, Wiener Konzerthaus, BOZAR in Brussels, Philharmonie Luxembourg, Tokyo Opera City Concert Hall, Sala São Paulo, and The Orpheum in Vancouver. Replacing Nobuyuki Tsujii, he made his London debut performing Tchaikovsky's Piano Concerto No. 2 with the Philharmonia Orchestra at Royal Festival Hall. He also returned to the National Philharmonic in Warsaw on Frédéric Chopin's birthdate for two sold-out recitals, which he dedicated to the victims of the Russian invasion of Ukraine.

On World Piano Day in 2022, Liu signed an exclusive contract with Deutsche Grammophon. Months earlier, the label released a live album of his performances at the International Chopin Piano Competition. The album was critically acclaimed and received praise from publications such as BBC Music Magazine and Gramophone. The latter included it on its list of the best classical albums of 2021 and called it "one of the most distinguished Chopin recitals of recent years, full of maturity, character and purpose."

== Personal life ==
Liu speaks French, English, and Mandarin Chinese fluently.

== Discography ==
Title	Album details	Certifications
Bruce Liu – Winner of the International Fryderyk Chopin Piano Competition 2021	Released: November 19, 2021; Label: Deutsche Grammophon; Format: CD, digital download, streaming	ZPAV: Gold
Chopin: Piano Concerto in E minor, Sonata in B flat minor, Ballade in F major, Rondo à la Mazur	Released: January 20, 2022; Label: Fryderyk Chopin Institute; Format: CD, digital download, streaming	
Waves: Music by Rameau · Ravel · Alkan	Released: November 3, 2023; Label: Deutsche Grammophon; Format: CD, digital download, streaming	
Tchaikovsky: The Seasons	Released: November 1, 2024; Label: Deutsche Grammophon; Format: CD, digital download, streaming	
Lunaris	Released: August 7, 2026; Label: Deutsche Grammophon; Format: CD, digital download, streaming	

== Awards ==
- 2012: Thomas & Evon Cooper International Competition – Second Prize
- 2012: Orchestre Symphonique de Montréal Standard Life Competition – Grand Prize
- 2015: Prix d'Europe – Winner
- 2016: Sendai International Music Competition – Fourth Prize and Audience Prize
- 2021: International Chopin Piano Competition – First Prize
