= Gina Bachauer International Piano Competition =

American piano competition

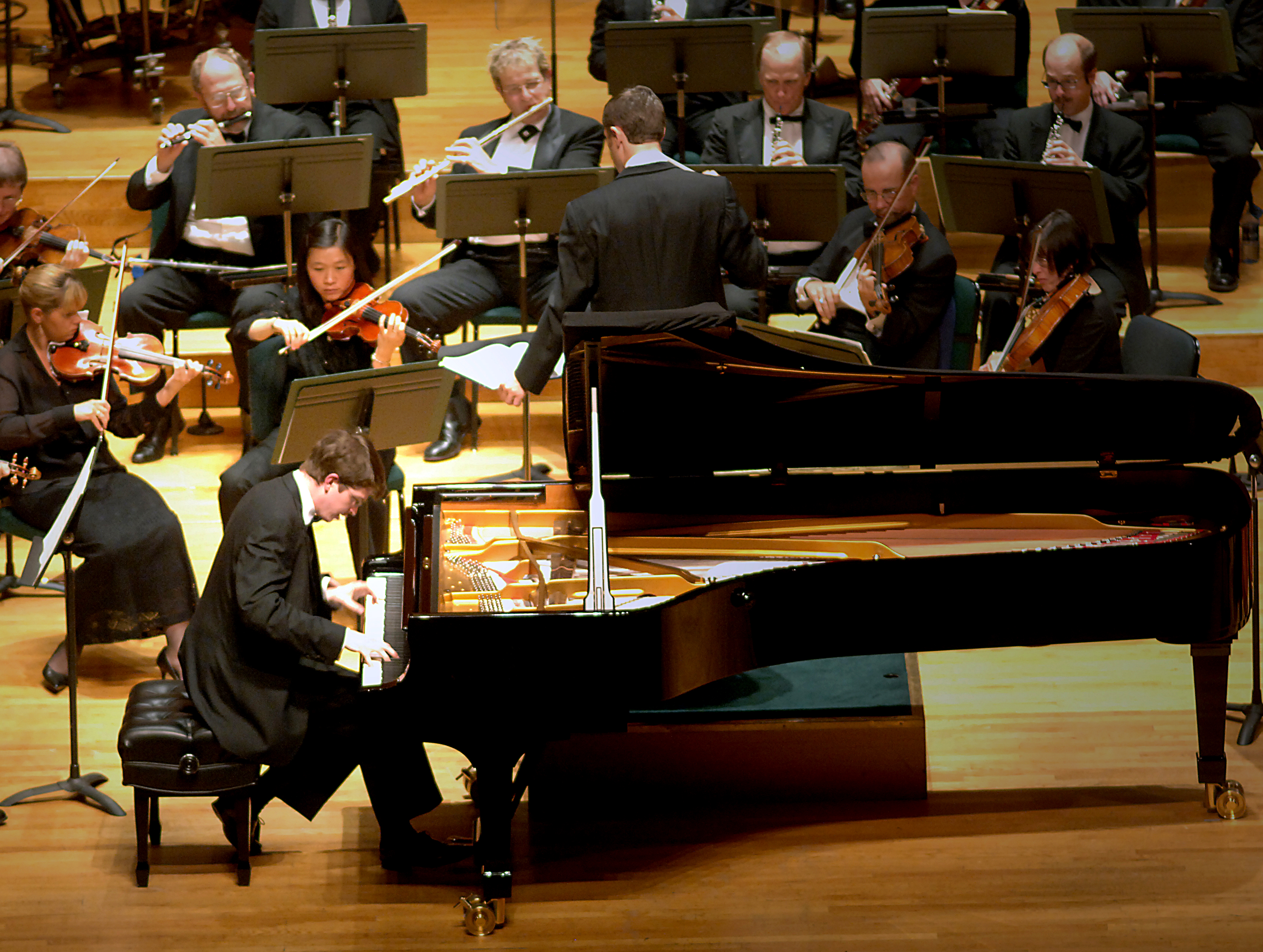
Stephen Beus performs in the 2006 Gina Bachauer International Piano Competition.

The Gina Bachauer International Piano Competition is based in Salt Lake City, Utah and is the second largest piano competition in the United States.

The competition has three age categories: the International Artists Competition for pianists aged 19–32, the Young Artist Competition ages 15–18, and the Junior Competition ages 11–14.

The competition is managed by the Gina Bachauer International Piano Foundation, a non-profit organization. The foundation hosts regular piano competitions, concerts, and festivals on a four-year cycle.

== History ==
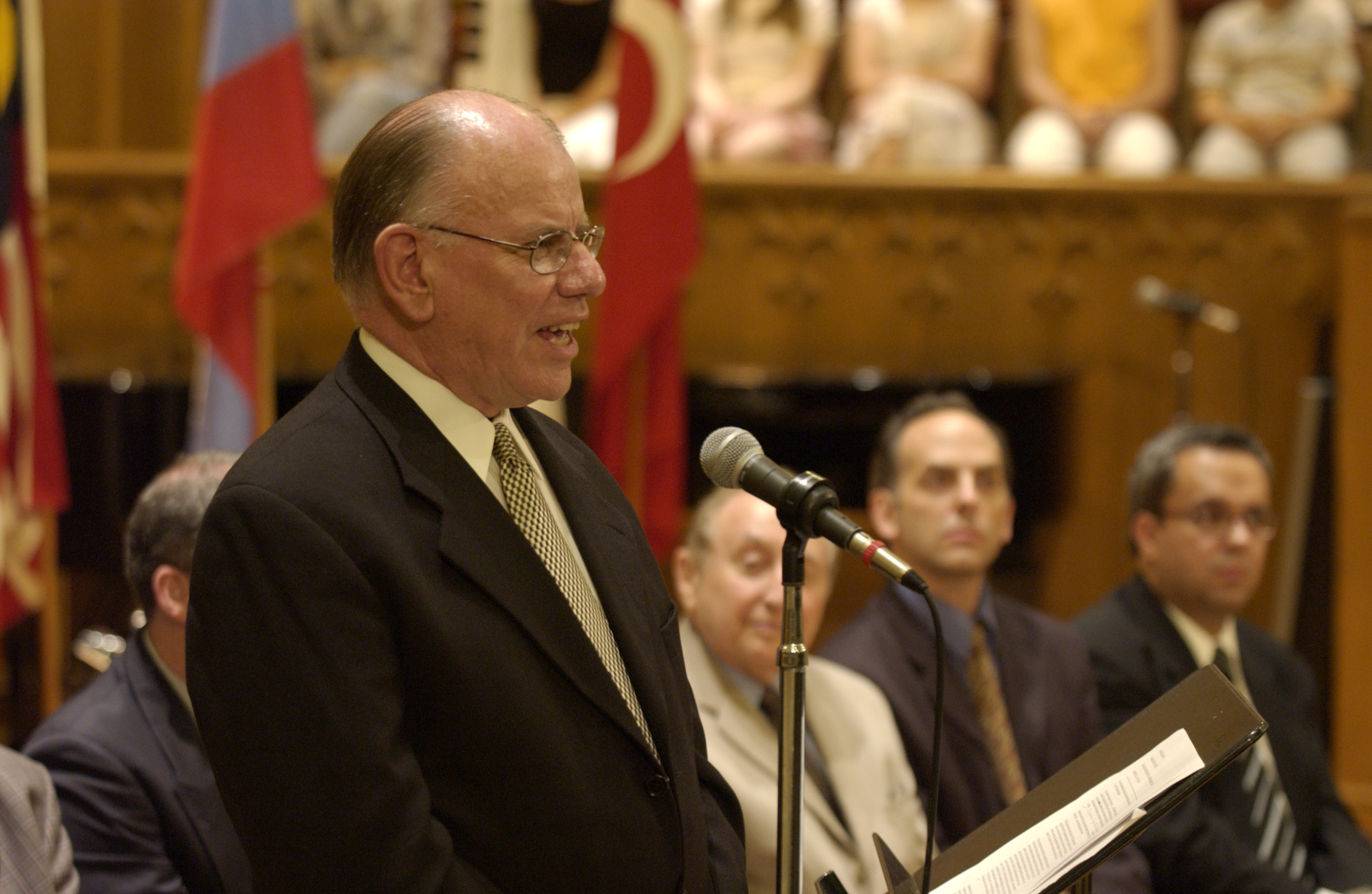
Dr. Paul Pollei speaks at the Gina Bachauer International Junior Piano Competition

The Gina Bachauer International Piano Competition was founded in 1976 by Paul Pollei, a member of the piano faculty at Brigham Young University. It was hosted by the university as part of the Summer Piano Festival from 1976 to 1980. In 1978 Gina Bachauer's widower, Alec Sherman, announced that the name of Gina Bachauer was to be given to the Competition in honor of his wife, the celebrated Greek pianist who was popular in Utah, having appeared with Maurice Abravanel and the Utah Symphony.

The Gina Bachauer International Piano Competition became part of the Utah Symphony in 1980 and relocated to Salt Lake City. The competition was held every other year during the month of June and the gold medalist received a Steinway grand piano and a recital debut in New York City. In 1983, the foundation was admitted as a member of the World Federation of International Music Competitions based in Geneva, Switzerland. Candidates from more than 40 countries have participated as contestants in the foundation's competitions.

More than 1,000 pianists have competed in the Gina Bachauer International Piano Competitions and cash prizes totaling more than $300,000 have been awarded. The competition is renowned for launching the careers of duo-pianists Gail Niwa and Lori Sims.

== Winners ==
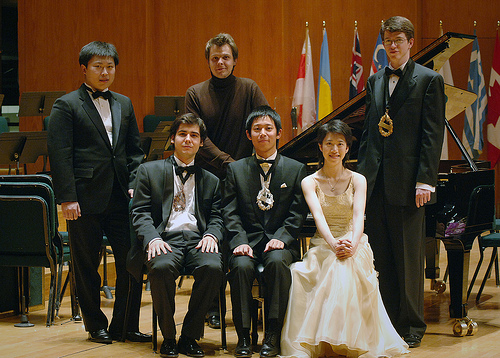
Laureates of the 2006 Gina Bachauer International Piano Competition

Gold Medal winners of the International Artists Competition:

- 1976 – Douglas Humpherys, USA
- 1977 – Christopher Giles, USA
- 1978 – Arthur Greene, USA
- 1979 – Panayis Lyras, USA
- 1980 – Duane Hulbert, USA
- 1982 – Michael Gurt, USA
- 1984 – Sara Davis Buechner (Note: As David Buechner), USA
- 1986 – Alec Chien, China
- 1988 – Xiang-Dong Kong, China
- 1991 – Gail Niwa, USA
- 1994 – Nicholas Angelich, USA
- 1998 – Lori Sims, USA
- 2002 – Cédric Pescia, Switzerland
- 2006 – Stephen Beus, USA
- 2024 – Youl Sun, South Korea

Gold Medal winners of the Junior Competition:

- 1999 – Yundi Li, China
- 2004 – Rachel Cheung, Hong Kong
- 2008 – Aristo Sham, Hong kong
- 2012 – Tony Yike Yang, China/Canada
- 2016 – Talon Smith, USA
- 2021 – Vsevolod Zavidov, Russia
- 2010 – Lukas Geniušas, Lithuania
- 2014 – Andrey Gugnin, Russia
- 2018 – Changyong Shin, South Korea

Other notable laureates include Kevin Kenner (1988), Armen Babakhanian (1991), Mehmet Okonsar (1991), Violetta Egorova (1991), Luiza Borac (1998), Vassily Primakov (2002), Lev Vinocour (2002); Young Artists laureates Yundi Li (1999), Leonardo Colafelice (2012), Aimi Kobayashi (2012); and Junior laureates Colleen Lee (1993), Nareh Arghamanyan (2000), Rachel Cheung (2004), Aristo Sham (2008), Tony Yike Yang (2012).

== Critical response ==
Several members of the press have noted the high caliber of talent of Bachauer competitors. The Deseret News said "only the best try out for the Gina Bachauer International Piano Competition." CBC News said "those chosen are considered the cream of the young virtuoso world. Finalists often end up being offered scholarships to music academies, moving on to classical music careers."

== See also ==
- American Protege International Piano and Strings Competition International Competition for Young Pianists and Professionals with winners performing at Carnegie Hall, New York Music Competition in Carnegie Hall New York 國際音樂比賽
- Gina Bachauer International Piano Foundation
- World Federation of International Music Competitions
- List of Classical Music Competitions
- Bakitone International
- Gina Bachauer
- Paul Pollei
