= Ilana Vered =

Ilana Vered (Hebrew: אילנה ורד; born December 6, 1943, in Tel Aviv, Israel) is a concert pianist and professor of piano.

== Biography ==
From age 13 to 15 Vered attended the Paris Conservatoire, which awarded her first prize in piano upon her graduation; among her teachers there were Vlado Perlemuter and Jeanne-Marie Darré. She continued her music studies at the Juilliard School under Rosina Lhévinne. In 1961 she won the Young Concert Artists International Auditions.

Vered has performed across the world with orchestras such as the New York Philharmonic, the Boston Symphony, the Philadelphia Orchestra, the Chicago Symphony, the Cleveland Orchestra, the San Francisco Symphony, the Los Angeles Philharmonic, the London Symphony, Royal Philharmonic, and Philharmonia, the Concertgebouw of Amsterdam, the Orchestre de la Suisse Romande, the Japan NHK Symphony Orchestra, the Munich Philharmonic, and the Israel Philharmonic. She has performed as soloist with conductors Leopold Stokowski, Georg Solti, Zubin Mehta, Rudolph Kempe, Kirill Kondrashin, Michael Tilson Thomas, Edo de Waart, Leonard Slatkin, Sergiu Comissiona, James Conlon, Andrew Davis, Kurt Sanderling, Jean-Claude Casadesus, Gary Bertini, Walter Weller, Wolfgang Sawallisch, Moshe Atzmon, Raymond Leppard, Mendi Rodan, James Judd, Lawrence Foster, Matthias Bamert, Mariss Janson and Osmo Vanska. She has performed as a chamber musician, and soloist, focusing on Frédéric Chopin and Moritz Moszkowski études. Vered has also taught master classes and has founded at least two festivals, the Summerfest Series of Rutgers University and Music Fest Perugia in Perugia, Italy.

She recorded for Decca in the 1970s. She made the world premiere complete recording of Moszkowski's 15 Études de Virtuosité, Op. 72, in 1970. She also recorded the five Beethoven concertos as well as the Rachmaninoff Concerto No. 2, Rachmaninoff Paganini Rhapsody, Mozart Concerto No. 21 and 23 and Brahms Concerto No. 2.

In 1984, she performed with the Naumburg Orchestral Concerts, in the Naumburg Bandshell, Central Park, in the summer series.

Vered has been a guest on television and radio, including appearances on The Today Show, Good Morning America, and the Merv Griffin Show, as well as guest performances on Public Broadcasting Service (PBS) Public television stations in the United States and the BBC in the United Kingdom. In collaboration with Swiss movie producer Adrian Marthaler, Vered has made a series of feature-length films entitled "Looking at Music," which was telecast by the BBC, and the Arts and Entertainment and Bravo cable networks. These films are being distributed as home videos in the U.S. by BMG.

In 2005, Vered founded Music Fest Perugia, which has grown to become an internationally renowned classical music festival. It attracts top, aspiring young classical musicians from around the world.

== Sources ==
- Kehler, George. The Piano in Concert, Scarecrow Press, 1982.
- Myers, Kurtz. Index to Record Reviews, vol. 5, G.K. Hall, 1980.
- Wilson, Lyle G. A Dictionary of Pianists, Robert Hale, 1985.
