= Leonardo Colafelice =

Italian pianist

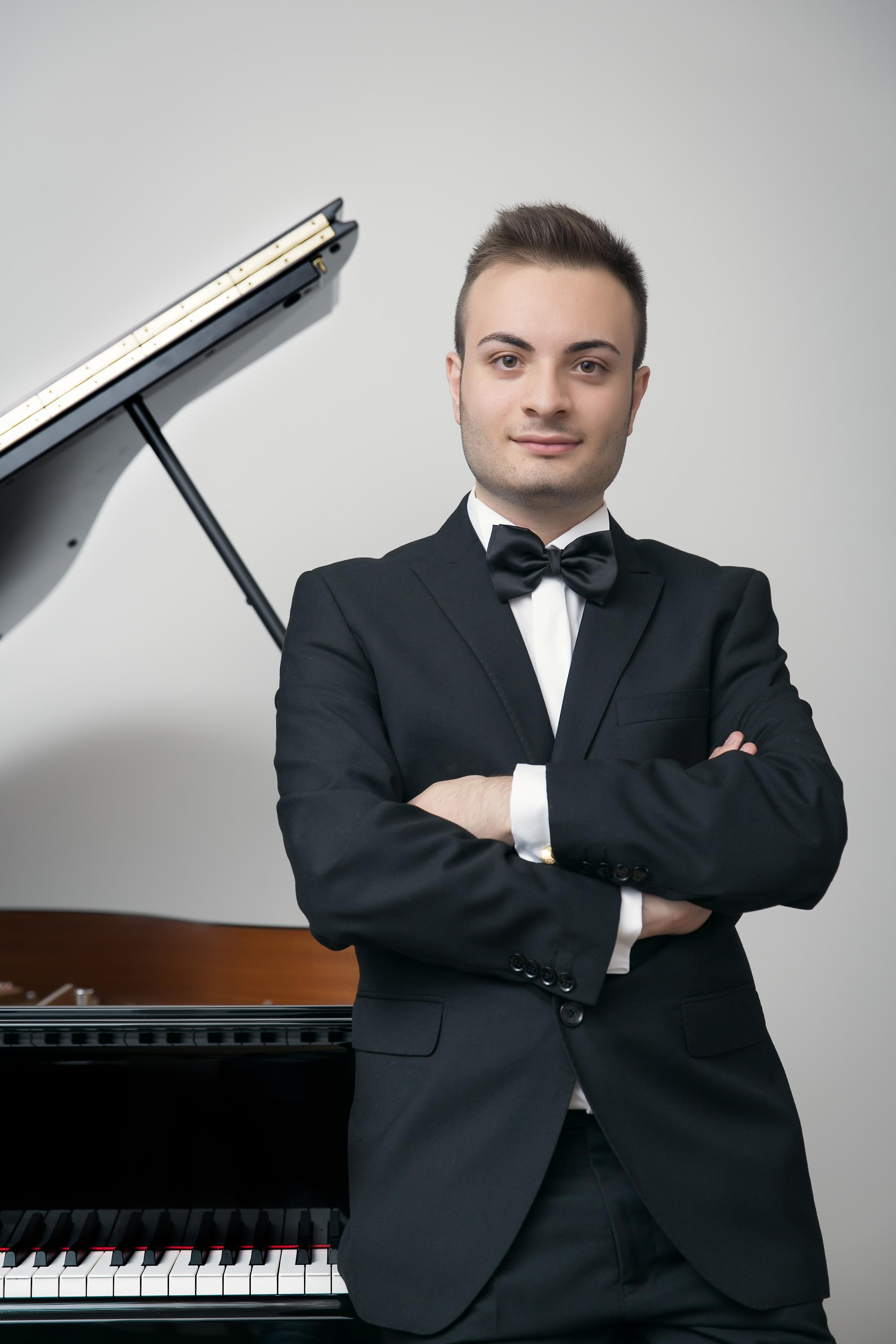

Leonardo Colafelice (born October 11, 1995) is an Italian pianist.

Colafelice was born in Altamura, Bari, and started playing the piano when he was 8 years old. He is currently a piano professor at the Niccolò Piccinni Conservatory of Music in Bari, Italy. He won the first prize in over 60 international piano competitions, among them the Gina Bachauer Young Artists International Piano Competition, the Cooper International Piano Competition, the Hilton Head International Piano Competition, the Yamaha USASU International Piano Competition, the Eastman Young Artists International Piano Competition, and the Aarhus International Piano Competition. He won the second prize in the 2016 Cleveland International Piano Competition, where he performed with the Cleveland Orchestra for the second time. He was a finalist in the 2014 Arthur Rubinstein International Piano Master Competition where he won special prizes for Best Performer of a Classical Concerto ($5,000), Best Performer of a piece by Chopin ($3,000) and the Advanced Studies Grant for the most outstanding pianist 22 years of age and below of $1,000 a year for three consecutive years, in addition to the $6,000 finalist prize. In 2015 he was awarded with the 6th prize at the Ferruccio Busoni Piano Competition. He has performed with several orchestras including the Cleveland Orchestra and the Israel Philharmonic Orchestra, and has collaborated with such conductors as Giordano Bellincampi, Jahja Ling, Avner Biron, Asher Fisch, Frédéric Chaslin, Eugene Tzigane, Tito Muñoz.
