= Music Fest Perugia =

Classical music festival in Italy

- Genre: Classical music
- Locations: Perugia, Italy
- Years active: 2006–present
- Founders: Peter Hermes and Ilana Vered
- Website: http://www.musicfestperugia.net/

Music Fest Perugia (MFP) is an international summer classical-music festival held annually in Perugia, Italy. It brings together young musicians, professors, and orchestras for an intensive performance-based programme focused on solo concerto opportunities, masterclasses, and chamber music. Since its founding in 2006, the festival has grown to become one of the largest educational music festivals in Italy.

== History ==
The festival was founded in 2006 by concert pianist Ilana Vered and Dr. Peter Hermes. Its first edition was held in Monte Castello di Vibio, Italy hosting eight students in a residential masterclass format. In 2007 the festival moved to the city of Perugia where it expanded significantly in both size and programme offerings (piano, violin, voice, conducting). By the 2010s, the festival had grown to include more than 200 students, 50 professors, and multiple resident orchestras each summer. Participants now come from more than 40 countries.

It is currently under the management of artistic director Ilana Vered and Peter Hermes is the executive director.

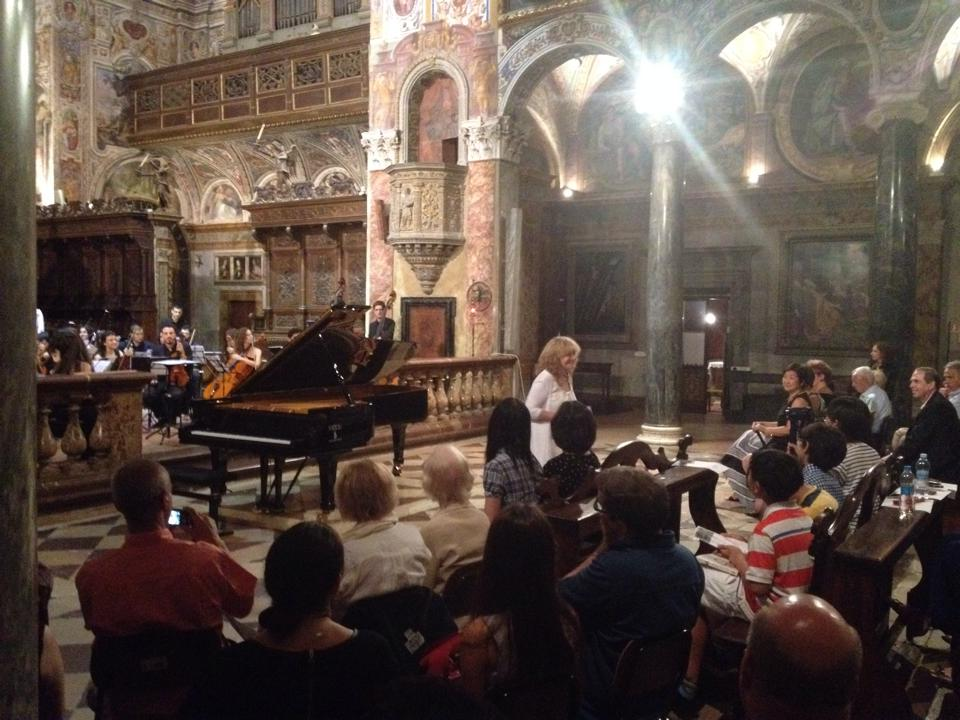
Ilana Vered at Basilica di San Pietro in Music Fest Perugia 2014

== General information ==
The festival attracts advanced-level young classical musicians from all over the world, who get the opportunity to perform concerti with orchestra as well as participate in lessons and master classes and perform in marathon recitals and in chamber music events. The festival also produces an opera. The concerts take place in halls such as Basilica di San Pietro, Sala dei Notari, Teatro Pavone, most of them famous for their extraordinary acoustics.
