= Douglas Humpherys =

American pianist, educator, and adjudicator

Douglas Humpherys is an American pianist, educator, and adjudicator.

== Performing career ==
Douglas Humpherys won the Gold Medal at the first Gina Bachauer International Piano Competition in 1976, and has performed in Asia, Europe, and North America. He has also recorded a wide variety of repertoire on CD, and been featured in live broadcasts of PBS Television and National Public Radio.

== Career in Education ==
Dr. Humpherys is currently chair of the piano department at the Eastman School of Music. He has taught hundreds of master classes at universities, conservatories, music academies, and festivals throughout the world. He has also presented lectures to the European Piano Teachers’ Association, the Music Teachers’ National Association, the World Conference on Piano Pedagogy, and the National Conference on Keyboard Pedagogy.

== Adjudication ==
He has served on the jury of the Gina Bachauer International Piano Competition eleven times, and has also been a jurist for the Rachmaninoff International Young Artists’ Piano Competition, the Chinese 2005 National Competition in Beijing, the PTNA National Piano Competition in Tokyo, and the Hilton Head, Bösendorfer, and Cleveland International Piano Competitions. He also created the Eastman Young Artists’ International Piano Competition, which he also oversees as director.
