= Stephen Beus =

American pianist

Stephen Beus (born 1981, Othello, Washington, United States) is an American pianist.

== Biography ==
Stephen Beus began taking piano lessons at age 5, and made his symphonic debut at age 9. He won the MTNA National Competition at the high school level at age 17, and later won the same competition again at age 21 at the collegiate level. He attended nearby Whitman College for undergraduate studies, and later attended the Juilliard School of Music at the graduate level. In 2011, Stephen obtained his DMA at Stony Brook University. His teachers have included Leonard Richter, Gilbert Kalish, Christina Dahl, Paulette Richards and Robert McDonald. Stephen and his wife have six children.

== Career ==
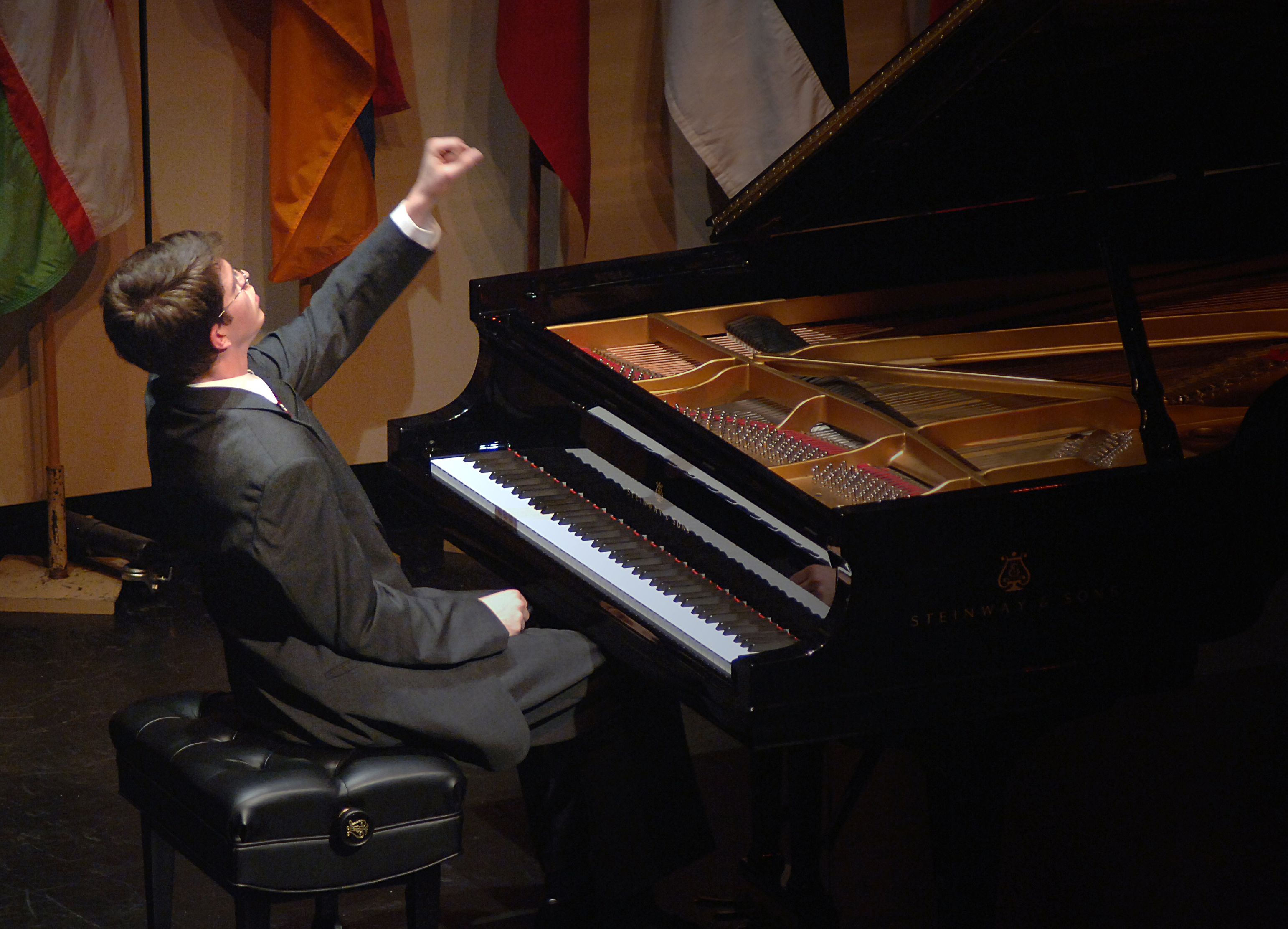
Stephen Beus performs in the 2006 Gina Bachauer International Piano Competition

Since graduating from Juilliard, Beus has maintained an active performance and competition schedule. In 2006 he won first prize in the Gina Bachauer International Piano Competition and Vendome International Piano Competition, as well as the Max I Allen Fellowship from the American Piano Awards. He competed in the XII Van Cliburn International Piano Competition in 2005, and the Thirteenth Van Cliburn International Piano Competition in 2009.

In 2006 he released his first album, Excursions: Piano Music of Barber and Bauer, on the Endeavor Classics label. His second, Stephen Beus Plays Griffes and Scriabin, was released in 2007 on Harmonia Mundi.

In 2010, Stephen performed with the Naumburg Orchestral Concerts, in the Naumburg Bandshell, Central Park, in the summer series.

Stephen is currently an assistant professor in the Keyboard Division at Brigham Young University in Provo, Utah.
