= World Piano Competition =

Nonprofit classical-music promoter in Ohio

World Piano Competition, Inc.
- Formation: 1960
- Dissolved: 2020
- Type: Not-for-profit Organization

World Piano Competition, Inc. was a not-for-profit arts organization based in Cincinnati, Ohio, and was dedicated to the promotion of classical piano music.

== History ==
The organization was granted their non-profit, tax-exempt status in 1985. The competition was "America’s oldest annual piano competition for both Artists and Young Artists" and had featured performers from across the globe since 1956. Their mission was, "to inspire and positively impact our diverse communities with the joy and power of piano music, and celebrate and support young artists, locally and internationally, as they begin their careers." The competition gained international traction when a photo of a bloody piano was shared nearly 4,000 times on Facebook. Jack Rouse, who was chairman of the board for the competition, hopes the competition would be able to eventually find its way back to a financially viable state. The competition was partnered with two musical organizations also located in Cincinnati: University of Cincinnati College – Conservatory of Music and the Cincinnati Symphony Orchestra. Both the international Artist Division and regional Young Artist Division competitions were held annually at the University of Cincinnati – College-Conservatory of Music, and winners in both competitions received cash prizes and recital opportunities in New York City. Finalists in the Artist Division competition perform with the Cincinnati Symphony Orchestra. Awadagin Pratt, an associate professor of music at the college-Conservatory of Music, was artistic director in 2012 and the grand prize in 2015 included $45,000 and a recital in New York.

24 competitors were heard in Cincinnati following a pre-screening round. Competitors were then expected to play a 40-minute recital and, if successful, a 60-minute recital if they advanced to the final round.

Due to the inability to raise the required $300,000 to continue the competition for the coming years, the competition was forced to discontinue the event after their 60th anniversary in 2016.

== Competition Winners ==
Year	Gold	Silver	Bronze
2013	Marianna Prjevalskaya	Jin Uk Kim	Misha Namirovsky
2014	Moye Chen	~	Feng Bian / Reed Tetzloff
2015	Artem Yasynskyy	~	~
