= Daniel Pollack =

American pianist

Daniel Pollack is an American pianist.

== Biography ==
=== Early life and education ===
Daniel Pollack was born in 1935 and raised in Los Angeles, California.

As a child prodigy, he began his studies at the age of four and made his debut with the New York Philharmonic at the age of nine, performing the Chopin Piano Concerto No. 1.

He is a graduate of the Juilliard School from the class of the legendary Rosina Lhévinne. He also studied with Ethel Leginska and Lillian Steuber in Los Angeles. Pollack continued his graduate studies at the Hochschule für Musik in Vienna under a Fulbright scholarship with Bruno Seidlhofer, at the Accademia Musicale Chigiana in Siena, Italy with Guido Agosti, and was selected as one of 12 pianists internationally to participate in a special Beethoven Master Class with the late Wilhelm Kempff in Positano, Italy. In Italy, he also attended masterclasses with Arturo Benedetti Michelangeli.

=== Career ===
Pollack was a prize winner in the historic International Tchaikovsky Competition in Moscow 1958. He subsequently concertized throughout the former Soviet Union and became the first American to record there for the Melodiya record label, selling millions of recordings throughout the former Soviet Union over several decades. Some of these recordings have been re-issued in Europe and the U.S. under several different labels. Pollack has also recorded for other record labels such as NAXOS, Sony, RCM, Columbia, MCA, Cambria and Four Winds.

Pollack's concert career has taken him across five continents – North America, Europe, Asia, South America and Africa. Highlight appearances as soloist with major orchestras in the U.S. include the New York Philharmonic, Los Angeles Philharmonic, Baltimore Symphony, Minnesota Orchestra, San Francisco Symphony; and worldwide, Moscow State Philharmonic, St. Petersburg, Russia, London's Royal Philharmonic, Bergen Symphony, Norway, Seoul Philharmonic, Hong Kong Philharmonic, National Symphony Orchestra of Bogotá, Colombia, Montevideo Symphony, among others.

Pollack has performed solo recitals in all the major music centers of the world including London's Royal Festival Hall, Vienna's Musikverein, Amsterdam's Concertgebouw, Buenos Aires' Teatro Colón, Seoul's Arts Center, Moscow's Bolshoi Zal, New York's Carnegie Hall, Chicago's Orchestra Hall, Los Angeles' Music Center. Additional highlights of Pollack's career include guest appearances at Tchaikovsky's home in Kline, Russia, performing on the composer's piano and at a joint session of the United States Congress in honor of President Harry Truman's Centennial.

He has also served on international competition juries including the Tchaikovsky Piano Competition in Moscow as well as on the Queen Elizabeth Competition in Brussels, the Maria Callas International Piano Competition in Athens, Greece; the Gina Bachauer International Piano Competition, Salt Lake City; the Hamamatsu, and Sonoda Competitions in Japan; the UNISA in Pretoria, South Africa; the Prokofiev in St. Petersburg; and the Rachmaninoff Competition in Moscow.

Pollack is a professor of music at the Thornton School of Music at the University of Southern California. His students have won prizes and have been finalists in several international piano competitions.

== Discography ==
- RCM: COLORS: Franz Liszt, Robert Schumann
- Cambria Records, 1958 & 1961: Legendary Moscow Recordings
- Columbia AP 12411: Daniel Pollack (1974) - works by Bach, Brahms, Rachmaninoff, Scriabin, Debussy, and Liszt
- NAXOS, Complete Piano Solo CD - Samuel Barber - Grammy Nomination
- Infinity Digital Sony Music Chopin: Piano Sonatas Nos. 2 & 3 Nocturnes/Ballade
- FOUR WINDS, First Kiss - Romantic Piano Music for Love and Passion
- FOUR WINDS, Passionate Kiss - Romantic Piano Music
- MCA, "The Competition" film score: Prokofiev Concerto No. 3

== Reception ==
Colors was released in 2007, and featured works by Schumann and Liszt and was met with critical acclaim. Pollack's CD "The Legendary Moscow Recordings of 1958 and 1961," released in 2002 on the Cambria label, feature Pollack's early performances drawn from the archived tapes of the Russian record label Melodya – records that sold in the millions throughout the former Soviet Union over several decades.

== Family ==
Pollack's family includes his wife (Noemi Pollack), two sons (Gregory and Stefan Pollack), two daughters-in-law, and grandchildren (Sophie, Elyse, and Jacob Pollack).
