= List of post-nominal letters (Australia) =

This is a list of post-nominal letters (letters after people's names) that have been nominated by orders from government, and letters from professional associations in Australia.

== General conventions ==
In general, postnominals are arranged in the following sequence: (Note: minor input from other sources not listed)

1. Honours promulgated by the Governor-General in the Commonwealth Government Gazette, e.g. Current National and former Imperial honours order of wearing,
2. Honours and Appointments promulgated by a State Governor or Territory Administrator in the relevant State Government Gazette, e.g. Member of Parliament (MP), Fellows of the Royal Society of NSW (FRSN), King's / Queen's Counsel (KC/QC), Senior Counsel (SC, but only where gazetted in the State or Territorial Gazette), and Justice of the Peace (JP),
3. Those honorary qualifications requiring a report to the State, Territorial or Federal Parliament (such as Honorary Doctorates),
4. Fellowships then memberships of professional and academic bodies (with those incorporated by an Act of Parliament or Royal Charter taking precedent),
5. Degrees and diplomas, first grouped according to the corresponding Australian Qualifications Framework levels and ordered from highest-to-lowest, then in chronological order within those groups,
6. Parliamentary and military designations.

Full-stops are not usually used in postnominals.

== Orders and decorations ==
Orders and decorations	Post-nominal	
Orders and decorations	Awarded since 6 Oct 1992	Awarded before 6 Oct 1992
Recipient of the Victoria Cross and Recipient of the Victoria Cross for Australia (Note: Refers to both the Imperial Victoria Cross and the Victoria Cross for Australia. Awarding of the Imperial Victoria Cross to Australian citizens ended when the Victoria Cross for Australia was created as part of the Australian Honours System in 1991.)	VC	VC
Recipient of the George Cross (Note: These are Imperial awards. All Imperial awards made to Australian citizens after 5 October 1992 are classed as foreign awards, and hence such Australian citizens are not entitled to use the associated post-nominal letters. (Those who were presented with these awards before that date are still permitted to use the post-nominal letters.))		GC (Note: In the period 1975-1991, for Australian citizens and ADF personnel, a number of Imperial awards were replaced by Australian awards noted in the table below.: Date / Group / Imperial award / Australian award; 1975 / citizens / George Cross (GC) / Recipient of the Cross of Valour (Australia) (CV); 18 Oct 1989 / citizens / Royal Red Cross (RRC & ARRC) / Nursing Service Cross (Australia) (NSC); 1991 / ADF / Distinguished Conduct Medal (DCM); Conspicuous Gallantry Medal (CGM); Distinguished Service Order (DSO) / Star of Gallantry (SG); Distinguished Service Cross (Australia) (DSC))
Recipient of the Cross of Valour	CV	CV
Knight/Lady Companion of the Order of the Garter	KG/LG	KG/LG
Knight/Lady of the Order of the Thistle	KT/LT	KT/LT
Knight/Dame Grand Cross of the Order of the Bath		GCB
Member of the Order of Merit	OM	OM
Knight/Dame of the Order of Australia (Note: Provision for further awards at the Knight & Dame level within the Order of Australia was removed by Her Majesty The Queen on 3 March 1986 on the advice of the Prime Minister. Those who have been awarded this rank are still permitted to use the title and the post-nominal letters.)	AK/AD	AK/AD
Knight/Dame Grand Cross of the Order of St Michael and St George		GCMG
Knight/Dame Grand Cross of the Royal Victorian Order	GCVO	GCVO
Knight/Dame Grand Cross of the Order of the British Empire		GBE
Companion of the Order of Australia	AC	AC
Member of the Order of the Companions of Honour		CH
Knight/Dame Commander of the Order of the Bath		KCB/DCB
Knight/Dame Commander of the Order of St Michael and St George		KCMG/DCMG
Knight/Dame Commander of the Royal Victorian Order	KCVO/DCVO	KCVO/DCVO
Knight/Dame Commander of the Order of the British Empire		KBE/DBE
Knight Bachelor (NB: Confers title of "Sir" – no postnominals)		
Officer of the Order of Australia	AO	AO
Companion of the Order of the Bath		CB
Companion of the Order of St Michael and St George		CMG
Commander of the Royal Victorian Order	CVO	CVO
Commander of the Order of the British Empire		CBE
Recipient of the Star of Gallantry	SG	SG
Recipient of the Star of Courage (Australia)	SC	SC
Companion of the Distinguished Service Order		DSO
Recipient of the Distinguished Service Cross (Australia)	DSC	DSC
Member of the Order of Australia	AM	AM
Lieutenant of the Royal Victorian Order	LVO	LVO
Officer of the Order of the British Empire		OBE
Companion of the Imperial Service Order		ISO
Member of the Royal Victorian Order	MVO	MVO
Member of the Order of the British Empire		MBE
Recipient of the Conspicuous Service Cross (Australia)	CSC	CSC
Recipient of the Nursing Service Cross (Australia)	NSC	NSC
Member of the Royal Red Cross (1st Class)		RRC
Recipient of the Distinguished Service Cross (UK)		DSC
Recipient of the Military Cross		MC
Recipient of the Distinguished Flying Cross (UK)		DFC
Recipient of the Air Force Cross (UK)		AFC
Associate of the Royal Red Cross (2nd Class)		ARRC
Recipient of the Medal for Gallantry	MG	MG
Recipient of the Bravery Medal (Australia)	BM	BM
Recipient of the Distinguished Service Medal (Australia)	DSM	DSM
Recipient of the Public Service Medal (Australia)	PSM	PSM
Recipient of the Australian Police Medal	APM	APM
Recipient of the Australian Fire Service Medal	AFSM	AFSM
Recipient of the Ambulance Service Medal (Australia)	ASM	ASM
Recipient of the Emergency Services Medal (Australia)	ESM	ESM
Recipient of the Australian Corrections Medal		ACM
Recipient of the Australian Intelligence Medal	AIM	AIM
Medal of the Order of Australia	OAM	OAM
(Grade of the) Order of St John		Varies (Note: Post-nominals within the Order of St John are not recognised as notified in the Governor-General's media release of 14 August 1982.)
Recipient of the Distinguished Conduct Medal		DCM
Recipient of the Conspicuous Gallantry Medal		CGM
Recipient of the Conspicuous Gallantry Medal (Flying)		CGM
Recipient of the George Medal		GM
Recipient of the Conspicuous Service Medal	CSM	CSM
Recipient of the Australian Antarctic Medal	AAM	AAM
Recipient of the Queen's Police Medal for Gallantry		QPM
Recipient of the Queen's Fire Service Medal for Gallantry		QFSM
Recipient of the Distinguished Service Medal (UK)		DSM
Recipient of the Military Medal		MM
Recipient of the Distinguished Flying Medal		DFM
Recipient of the Air Force Medal		AFM
Recipient of the Sea Gallantry Medal		SGM
Recipient of the Queen's Gallantry Medal		QGM
Recipient of the Royal Victorian Medal	RVM	RVM
Recipient of the British Empire Medal		BEM
Recipient of the Queen's Police Medal for Distinguished Service		QPM
Recipient of the Queen's Fire Service Medal for Distinguished Service		QFSM
Recipient of the Reserve Force Decoration	RFD	RFD

== Legal offices ==
Position	Post-nominal
King's Counsel	KC
Senior Counsel	SC
Bail Justice – Victoria	BJ
Justice of the Peace	JP
Justice of the Peace(Magistrates Court)	JP(Mag.Crt)
Justice of the Peace(Qualified)	JP(Qual)
Justice of the Peace(Commissioner of Declarations)	JP(C.dec)
Commissioner of Declarations	C.Dec
Special Justice (South Australia)	SJ
Civil Marriage Celebrant	CMC

== Academic awards ==
Degree and diploma abbreviations are defined by the conferring university and vary from one to another. Consult the awarding university for the approved abbreviation.

Some loose general rules and examples include:

Degree	Post-nominal	
Bachelor of "Speciality/Faculty"	B"Speciality" e.g. BA, BSc, BCom, BBiosc, BE or BEng, BEd, BPharm, etc.	
Bachelor of Medicine/Surgery	e.g. MBBS, BMed, BMBS, MBChB	
Bachelor of Dental Surgery/Science	BDS, BDSc, BDent	
Bachelor of Laws	LLB	
Bachelor's degree with Honours	B"Speciality"(Hons)	
Master of "Speciality/Faculty"	M"Specialty" e.g. MA, MSc, MEd, MCom, etc.	
Master of Business Administration	MBA	
Master of Cyber Security	MCyberSec	
Master of Cyber Security, Strategy and Diplomacy	MCSSD	
Master of Laws	LLM	
Master of Philosophy	MPhil [discipline] (Note: Note this can be a research-led master's in a range of subjects, not just philosophy (cf PhD))	
Master of Public Health	MPH	
Master of Research	MRes. Another research master's degree.	
Graduate Certificate in "Speciality/Faculty"	GCert or GradCert e.g. GCertMkting	
Postgraduate Diploma of "Speciality/Faculty"	PGDip"Speciality" or PostGradDip"Speciality"	
Graduate Diploma of "Speciality/Faculty"	GDip"Speciality" or GradDip"Speciality" e.g. GDipMngt	
Juris Doctor	JD	
Doctor of Medicine	MD	
Doctor of Medicine and Surgery	MChD	
Doctor of Dental Medicine	DMD	
Doctor of Dental Surgery	DDS	
Doctor of Clinical Dentistry	DClinDent	
Doctor of Podiatric Medicine	DPM	
Doctor of Philosophy	PhD	
Doctor of Veterinary Medicine	DVM	
Doctor of Psychology	DPsych	
Doctor of Public Safety	DPS	(c) = Doctoral Candidate
Doctor of Business Administration	DBA	
Professional Doctorate of "Speciality/Faculty"	D"speciality" or "Specialty"D e.g. EdD, DEng	
Higher Doctorate of "Speciality/Faculty"	D"speciality" or "Specialty"D e.g. DEng, DSc	
Fellowship in Music, Australia	FMusA	
Licentiate in Music, Australia	LMusA	
Associate in Music, Australia	AMusA	
Professional Certificate of "Speciality/Faculty"	ProfCert"Speciality" e.g. ProfCertDataSc	

== Professional ==
Fellowship, Membership and Associate Membership of Professional Institutions.

Organisation	Award	Post-nominal
Academy of the Social Sciences in Australia	Fellow	FASSA
ACS (Australian Computer Society)	Associate (Note: ACS membership post-nominals may be followed by a further post-nominal indicating the member's professional certification status)	AACS
ACS (Australian Computer Society)	Member	MACS
ACS (Australian Computer Society)	Senior Member	MACS (Snr)
ACS (Australian Computer Society)	Fellow	FACS
ACS (Australian Computer Society)	Certified Technologist Certified Technologist (Cyber Security)	CT (a CT is also entitled to use the post-nominal of IP3T)
ACS (Australian Computer Society)	Certified Professional Certified Professional (Cyber Security) Certified Professional (Safety Critical Systems)	CP (a CP is also entitled to use the post-nominal of IP3P)
Association for Business Restructuring & Turnaround Limited (ABRT)	Restructuring & Turnaround Associate	RTA
Association for Business Restructuring & Turnaround Limited (ABRT)	Certified Restructuring & Turnaround Executive	RTE®
Association for Business Restructuring & Turnaround Limited (ABRT)	Certified Restructuring & Turnaround Practitioner	RTP®
Astronomical Society of Australia	Fellow	FASA
Astronomical Society of Australia	Member	MASA
Australia and New Zealand Academy of Management	Life Fellow	ANZAM-L
Australia and New Zealand Academy of Management	Fellow	ANZAM-F
Australia and New Zealand Academy of Management	Professional Member	ANZAM-M
Australia and New Zealand Academy of Management		ANZAM-R
Australia and New Zealand Academy of Management	Associate Member	ANZAM-A
Australasian College for Emergency Medicine	Fellow	FACEM
Australasian College for Emergency Medicine	Emergency Medicine Diploma	EMDip(ACEM)
Australasian College for Emergency Medicine	Emergency Medicine Certificate	EMCert(ACEM)
Australasian College of Health Service Management (ACHSM)	Member	MCHSM
Australasian College of Health Service Management (ACHSM)	Associate Fellow	AFCHSM
Australasian College of Health Service Management (ACHSM)	Certified Health Manager	AFCHSM CHM
Australasian College of Health Service Management (ACHSM)	Fellow	FCHSM
Australasian College of Health Service Management (ACHSM)	Certified Health Executive	FCHSM CHE
Australasian College of Paramedicine	Member	MACPara
Australasian College of Paramedicine	Life Member	LMACpara
Australasian College of Paramedicine	Fellow	FACPara
Australasian College of Pharmacy	Member	MACP
Australasian College of Physical Scientists and Engineers in Medicine (ACPSEM)	Distinguished Fellow	DFACPSEM
Australasian College of Physical Scientists and Engineers in Medicine (ACPSEM)	Fellow	FACPSEM
Australasian College of Physical Scientists and Engineers in Medicine (ACPSEM)	Member	MACPSEM
Australasian College of Road Safety (ACRS)	Fellow	FACRS
Australasian College of Sport and Exercise Physicians	Fellow	FACSEP
Australasian College of Tropical Medicine	Fellow	FACTM
Australasian Epidemiological Association	Fellow	FAEA
Australasian Institute of Chartered Loss Adjusters	Fellow	FCLA
Australasian Institute of Chartered Loss Adjusters	Associate	ACLA
Australasian Institute of Chartered Loss Adjusters	Affiliate	AICLA (Aff)
Australasian Institute of Digital Health	Associate Fellow	AFAIDH
Australasian Institute of Digital Health	Fellow	FAIDH
Australasian Institute of Emergency Services	Member	MAIES
Australasian Institute of Emergency Services	Associate Fellow	AFAIES
Australasian Institute of Emergency Services	Fellow	FAIES
Australasian Institute of Emergency Services	Honorary Fellow	HFAIES
Australian Institute of Geoscientists (AIG)	Fellow	FAIG
Australian Institute of Geoscientists (AIG)	Member	MAIG
Australian Institute of Geoscientists (AIG)	Graduate	GAIG
Australian Institute of Geoscientists (AIG)	Student	SAIG
Australian Institute of Geoscientists (AIG)	Associate	AAIG
Australian Institute of Medical and Clinical Scientists (AIMS)	Fellow	FAIMS
Australian Institute of Medical and Clinical Scientists (AIMS)	Member (Clinical Scientist)	CSAIMS
Australian Institute of Medical and Clinical Scientists (AIMS)	Member (Research)	MAIMS (Research) or MAIMS
Australian Institute of Medical and Clinical Scientists (AIMS)	Member (Multidiscipline)	MAIMS
Australian Institute of Medical and Clinical Scientists (AIMS)	Member (Anatomical Pathology)	MAIMS (Anatomical Pathology)
Australian Institute of Medical and Clinical Scientists (AIMS)	Member (Chemical Pathology)	MAIMS (Chemical Pathology)
Australian Institute of Medical and Clinical Scientists (AIMS)	Member (Haematology)	MAIMS (Haematology)
Australian Institute of Medical and Clinical Scientists (AIMS)	Member (Immunopathology)	MAIMS (Immunopathology)
Australian Institute of Medical and Clinical Scientists (AIMS)	Member (Medical Microbiology)	MAIMS (Medical Microbiology)
Australian Institute of Medical and Clinical Scientists (AIMS)	Member (Transfusion Science)	MAIMS (Transfusion Science)
Australasian Institute of Mining and Metallurgy (AusIMM)	Honorary Fellow	HonFAusIMM
Australasian Institute of Mining and Metallurgy (AusIMM)	Fellow	FAusIMM
Australasian Institute of Mining and Metallurgy (AusIMM)	Member	MAusIMM
Australasian Institute of Mining and Metallurgy (AusIMM)	Associate member	AAusIMM
Australasian Institute of Mining and Metallurgy (AusIMM)	Graduate member	GAusIMM
Australasian Institute of Mining and Metallurgy (AusIMM)	Student member	SAusIMM
Australian Institute for Teaching and School Leadership (AITSL)	Certified Teacher - Highly Accomplished	HAT
Australian Institute for Teaching and School Leadership (AITSL)	Certified Teacher - Lead	LT
Australasian Sonographers Association (ASA)	Fellow	FASA
Australasian Sonographers Association (ASA)	Associate Fellow	AFASA
Australian Academy of Health and Medical Sciences	Fellow	FAHMS
Australian Academy of the Humanities	Fellow	FAHA
Australian Academy of Law	Fellow	FAAL
Australian Academy of Science	Fellow	FAA
Australian Academy of Technological Sciences and Engineering	Fellow	FTSE (formerly FTS)
Australian Acoustical Society	Fellow	FAAS
Australian Acoustical Society	Member	MAAS
Australian and New Zealand College of Anaesthetists	Fellow	FANZCA
Australian and New Zealand College of Anaesthetists	Fellow of the Faculty of Pain Medicine	FFPMANZCA
Australian and New Zealand College of Veterinary Scientists	Fellow	FANZCVS
Australian and New Zealand College of Veterinary Scientists	Member	MANZCVS
Australian and New Zealand Institute of Insurance and Finance	Fellow	ANZIIF (Fellow) CIP
Australian and New Zealand Institute of Insurance and Finance	Senior Associate	ANZIIF (Snr Assoc) CIP
Australian and New Zealand Institute of Insurance and Finance	Associate	ANZIIF (Assoc) CIP
Australian and New Zealand Institute of Insurance and Finance	Affiliate	ANZIIF (Aff) CIP
Australian and New Zealand Society for Mass Spectrometry	Fellow	FANZSMS
Australian Association of Consultant Pharmacy	Accredited Associate	AACPA
Australian Association of Social Workers	Member	MAASW
Australian Cinematographers Society	Member	ACS
Australian College of Educators	Fellow	FACE
Australian College of Educators	Member	MACE
Australian College of Mental Health Nursing	Fellow	FACMHN
Australian College of Mental Health Nursing	Member	MACMHN
Australian College of Mental Health Nursing	Credentialed Mental Health Nurse	CMHN
Australian College of Nursing	Distinguished Life Fellow	FACN(DLF)
Australian College of Nursing	Honorary Fellow	FACN(Hon)
Australian College of Nursing	Fellow	FACN
Australian College of Nursing	Member	MACN
Australian College of Nursing	Associate	MACN(Assoc)
Australian College of Nursing	Student Member	MACN(Student)
Australian College of Rural and Remote Medicine	Fellow	FACRRM
Australian College of Pharmacy	Fellow	FACP
Australian College of Pharmacy	Fellow - Honoris Causa	FACP (HC)
Australian College of Pharmacy	Associate Fellow	AFACP
Australian College of Pharmacy	Member	MACP
Australian Council for Educational Leaders	Fellow	FACEL
Australian Council for Educational Leaders	Member	MACEL
Australian Culinary Federation	Member (Qualified Chef)	MACF
Australian Culinary Federation	Fellow (Qualified Chef)	FACF
Australian Graduate School of Leadership Certified Leadership Practitioner	Associate	ACLP
Australian Graduate School of Leadership Certified Leadership Practitioner	Member	MCLP
Australian Graduate School of Leadership Certified Leadership Practitioner	Senior Member	SCLP
Australian Graduate School of Leadership Certified Leadership Practitioner	Fellow	FCLP
Australian Graduate School of Leadership Certified Leadership Practitioner	Life Fellow	LCLP
Australian Human Resources Institute	Fellow Certified Practitioner Human Resources	FCPHR
Australian Human Resources Institute	Certified Practitioner Human Resources	CPHR
Australian Human Resources Institute	Fellow Certified Academic Human Resources	FCAHR
Australian Human Resources Institute	Certified Academic Human Resources	CAHR
Australian Human Resources Institute	Academic Member Australian Human Resources Institute	AMAHRI
Australian Human Resources Institute	Fellow Member Australian Human Resources Institute	FAHRI
Australian Human Resources Institute	Professional Member Australian Human Resources Institute	MAHRI
Australian Human Resources Institute	Graduate Member Australian Human Resources Institute	GAHRI
Australian Institute for the Conservation of Cultural Materials	Professional Member	PMAICCM
Australian Institute of Architects	Life Fellow	LFRAIA
Australian Institute of Architects	Fellow	FRAIA
Australian Institute of Architects	Registered Architect	RAIA
Australian Institute of Architects	Affiliate Member	Aff.RAIA
Australian Institute of Architects	Graduate of Architecture	RAIA (Grad)
Australian Institute of Building	Fellow	FAIB
Australian Institute of Building	Member	MAIB
Australian Institute of Building	Affiliate Member	Affil.AIB
Australian Institute of Building	Associate Member	AMAIB
Australian Institute of Building	Graduate Member	GradAIB
Australian Institute of Building Surveyors	Accredited Member	AMAIBS
Australian Institute of Building Surveyors	Accredited Fellow	AFAIBS
Australian Institute of Building Surveyors	Accredited Life Fellow	ALFAIBS
Australian Institute of Building Surveyors	Retired Member	MAIBS Ret.
Australian Institute of Building Surveyors	Retired Fellow	FAIBS Ret.
Australian Institute of Building Surveyors	Retired Life Fellow	LFAIBS Ret.
Australian Institute of Building Surveyors	Honorary Fellow	AIBS (Hon Fellow)
Australian Institute of Company Directors	Life Fellow	FAICDlife
Australian Institute of Company Directors	Fellow	FAICD
Australian Institute of Company Directors	Graduate Member	GAICD
Australian Institute of Company Directors	Member	MAICD
Australian Institute of Company Directors	Affiliate Member	AAICD
Australian Institute of Health and Safety	Certified Occupational Health and Safety Practitioner	COHSPrac
Australian Institute of Health and Safety	Certified Occupational Health and Safety Professional	COHSProf
Australian Institute of Health and Safety	Chartered Occupational Health and Safety Professional	ChOHSP
Australian Institute of Health and Safety	Fellow	FAIHS
Australian Institute of Management (Education and Training)	Fellow	FAIM
Australian Institute of Occupational Hygienists (AIOH)	Fellow	FAIOH
Australian Institute of Occupational Hygienists (AIOH)	Member	MAIOH
Australian Institute of Occupational Hygienists (AIOH)	Certified Occupational Hygienist	COH (Note: These post-nominals reflect current professional accreditation by a professional body and involve a continuing professional development requirement monitored by the awarding body. They operate independently of post-nominals conferred by membership of the organisation at various grades. For example, a Fellow of CILT with CPL accreditation would use the post-nominals FCILT, CPL. If upon retirement the individual chose to keep up membership of CILT, they would use the post-nominal FCILT alone as they would no longer meet the continuing professional development requirements for CPL.)
Australian Institute of Office Professionals	Fellow	FAIOP
Australian Institute of Office Professionals	Associate Fellow	AFAIOP
Australian Institute of Office Professionals	Member	MAIOP
Australian Institute of Office Professionals	Honorary Life Member	HLMAIOP
Australian Institute of Physics	Fellow	FAIP
Australian Institute of Physics	Member	MAIP
Australian Institute of Project Management (AIPM)	Certified Practising Portfolio Executive	CPPE
Australian Institute of Project Management (AIPM)	Certified Practising Portfolio Director	CPPD
Australian Institute of Project Management (AIPM)	Certified Practising Senior Project Manager	CPSPM
Australian Institute of Project Management (AIPM)	Certified Practising Project Manager	CPPM
Australian Institute of Project Management (AIPM)	Certified Practising Project Practitioner	CPPP
Australian Institute of Traffic Planning and Management (AITPM)	Fellow	FAITPM
Australian Institute of Traffic Planning and Management (AITPM)	Member	MAITPM
Australian Institute of Professional Intelligence Officers	Fellow	FAIPIO
Australian Institute of Professional Intelligence Officers	Member	MAIPIO
Australian Institute of Training & Development (AITD)	Fellow	FAITD
Australian Institute of Training & Development (AITD)	Associate Fellow	AFAITD
Australian KnifeMakers Guild (AKG)	Member	MAKG
Australian Library and Information Association	Associate Distinguished Certified Professional	AALIA (DCP)
Australian Library and Information Association	Associate Certified Professional	AALIA (CP)
Australian Library and Information Association	Associate	AALIA
Australian Library and Information Association	Library Technician Distinguished Certified Professional	ALIATec (DCP)
Australian Library and Information Association	Library Technician Certified Professional	ALIATec (CP)
Australian Library and Information Association	Library Technician	ALIATec
Australian Linguistic Society	Accredited Linguist	ALing
Australian Marketing Institute	Fellow	FAMI
Australian Marketing Institute	Associate Fellow	AFAMI
Australian Marketing Institute	Associate Member	AMAMI
Australian Marketing Institute	Certified Practising Marketer	CPM
Australian Mathematics Society	Fellow	FAustMS
Australian Mathematics Society	Graduate Member	GAustMS
Australian Mathematics Society	Member	MAustMS
Australian Medical Association	Member	AMA(M)
Australian Meteorological and Oceanographic Society	Fellow	FAMOS
Australian Orthopaedic Association	Fellow	FAOrthA
Australian Property Institute	Life Fellow	LFAPI
Australian Property Institute	Fellow	FAPIf
Australian Property Institute	Associate Member	AAPI
Australian Property Institute	Provisional Member	API (Provisional)
Australian Property Institute	Graduate Member	API (Graduate)
Australian Property Institute	Student Member	API (Student)
Australian Psychological Society	Honorary Fellow	Hon FAPS
Australian Psychological Society	Fellow	FAPS
Australian Psychological Society	Member	MAPS
Australian Psychological Society	Associate Member	Assoc MAPS
Australian Reconstructing Insolvency & Turnaround Association (ARITA)	Fellow	RITF
Australian Reconstructing Insolvency & Turnaround Association (ARITA)	Member	RITP
Australian Society of Medical Imaging and Radiation Therapy	Member	MASMIRT
Australian Society of Medical Imaging and Radiation Therapy	Fellow	FASMIRT
Australian Society of Microbiology	Member	MASM
Australian Society of Rehabilitation Counsellors	Associate Member	ASORC
Australian Society of Rehabilitation Counsellors	Full Member	MASRC
Australian Society of Microbiology	Member	MASM
Australian Society Microbiology	Fellow	FASM
Australian Tutoring Association	Member	MATA
Australian Veterinary Association	Fellow	FAVA
Certified Independent Financial Adviser	Member	MCIFAA
Chartered Accountants Australia and New Zealand	Fellow	FCA
Chartered Accountants Australia and New Zealand	Member	CA
Chartered Institute of Logistics and Transport in Australia	Fellow	FCILT
Chartered Institute of Logistics and Transport in Australia	Chartered Member	CMILT
Chartered Institute of Logistics and Transport in Australia	Member	MILT
Chartered Institute of Logistics and Transport in Australia	Certified Passenger Professional	CPP
Chartered Institute of Logistics and Transport in Australia	Certified Practicing Logistician	CPL
Chartered Institute of Logistics and Transport in Australia	Certified Transport Planner	CTP
Christian Educators Professional Association	Member	MCEPA
College of Intensive Care Medicine	Fellow	FCICM
College of Intensive Care Medicine	Fellow of the Joint Faculty of Intensive Care Medicine (historical)	FJFICM
CPA Australia (Certified Practicing Accountants)	Fellow	FCPA
CPA Australia (Certified Practicing Accountants)	Member	CPA
CPA Australia (Certified Practicing Accountants)	Associate	ASA
Economics Society of Australia	Professional Member	PMESA
Economics Society of Australia	Senior Fellow	SFESA
Engineers Australia (IEAust)	Honorary Fellow	Hon FIEAust
Engineers Australia (IEAust)	Fellow	FIEAust
Engineers Australia (IEAust)	Member	MIEAust
Engineers Australia (IEAust)	Graduate Member	GradIEAust
Engineers Australia (IEAust)	Engineering Executive	EngExec
Engineers Australia (IEAust)	Chartered Professional Engineer	CPEng
Engineers Australia (IEAust)	International Professional Engineer (Australia)	IntPE(Aus)
Engineers Australia (IEAust)	Honorary Engineering Technologist	Hon TFIEAust
Engineers Australia (IEAust)	Engineering Technologist Fellow	TFIEAust
Engineers Australia (IEAust)	Engineering Technologist Member	TMIEAust
Engineers Australia (IEAust)	Engineering Technologist Graduate Member	GradTIEAust
Engineers Australia (IEAust)	Chartered Engineering Technologist	CEngT
Engineers Australia (IEAust)	Honorary Engineering Associate Fellow	Hon AFIEAust
Engineers Australia (IEAust)	Engineering Associate Fellow	AFIEAust
Engineers Australia (IEAust)	Engineering Associate Member	AMIEAust
Engineers Australia (IEAust)	Engineering Associate Graduate Member	GradAIEAust
Engineers Australia (IEAust)	Chartered Engineering Associate	CEngA
Engineers Australia (IEAust)	Honorary Engineering Officer Fellow	Hon OFIEAust
Engineers Australia (IEAust)	Engineering Officer Fellow	OFIEAust
Engineers Australia (IEAust)	Engineering Officer Member	OMIEAust
Engineers Australia (IEAust)	Engineering Officer Graduate Member	GradOIEAust
Engineers Australia (IEAust)	Chartered Engineering Officer	CEngO
Engineers Australia (IEAust)	Student	StudIEAust
Asset Management Council	Certified Associate in Asset Management	CAAM
Asset Management Council	Certified Practitioner in Asset Management	CPAM
Asset Management Council	Certified Senior Practitioner in Asset Management	CSAM
Asset Management Council	Certified Fellow in Asset Management	CFAM
Asset Management Council	Certified Asset Management Assessor	CAMA
Environment Institute of Australia and New Zealand	Fellow	FEIANZ
Environment Institute of Australia and New Zealand	Member	MEIANZ
Environment Institute of Australia and New Zealand	Certified Environmental Practitioner	CEnvP
Environment Institute of Australia and New Zealand	CEnvP Ecology Specialist	CEnvP (Ecology Specialist)
Environment Institute of Australia and New Zealand	CEnvP Impact Assessment Specialist	CEnvP (IA Specialist)
Environment Institute of Australia and New Zealand	CEnvP Climate Change Specialist	CEnvP (CC Specialist)
Environment Institute of Australia and New Zealand	CEnvP Contaminated Land Specialist	CEnvP (CL Specialist)
Exercise and Sports Science Australia	Accredited Exercise Scientist	AES
Exercise and Sports Science Australia	Accredited Exercise Physiologist	AEP
Exercise and Sports Science Australia	Accredited Sports Scientist Level 1	ASpS1
Exercise and Sports Science Australia	Accredited Sports Scientist Level 2	ASpS2
Exercise and Sports Science Australia	Accredited High Performance Manager	AHPM
Federation of Australian Historical Societies	Fellow	FFAHS
Financial Planning Association of Australia	Certified Financial Planner	CFP
Financial Planning Association of Australia	Associate Member	AFP
Financial Services Institute of Australasia (FINSIA)	Senior Fellow	SF FIN
Financial Services Institute of Australasia (FINSIA)	Fellow	F FIN
Financial Services Institute of Australasia (FINSIA)	Chartered Banker (Note: FINSIA Chartered Banker status is conferred in association with the Chartered Banker Institute (UK))	Chartered Banker
Financial Services Institute of Australasia (FINSIA)	Senior Associate Member	SA FIN
Financial Services Institute of Australasia (FINSIA)	Associate Member	A FIN
Gemmological Association of Australia	Fellow	FGAA
Geospatial Council of Australia	Member	MGCA
Geospatial Council of Australia	Fellow	FGCA
Geospatial Council of Australia	Honorary Fellow	HonFGCA
Global Communication Certification Council	Communication Management Professional	CMP
Global Communication Certification Council	Strategic Communication Management Professional	SCMP
Governance Institute of Australia	Fellow	FGIA
Governance Institute of Australia	Associate	AGIA
Governance Institute of Australia	Certificated member	GIA(Cert)
Governance Institute of Australia	Affiliated member	GIA(Affiliated)
Health Information Management Association of Australia	Certified Health Information Manager	CHIM
Health Information Management Association of Australia	Certified Health Information Practitioner	CHIP
Australasian Institute of Digital Health	Certified Health Informatician Australia	CHIA
Human Genetics Society of Australasia	Fellow	FHGSA
Human Genetics Society of Australasia	Member	MHGSA
Independent Tertiary Education Council Australia (ITECA)	Certified Education Professional	CEP
Independent Tertiary Education Council Australia (ITECA)	Certified Education Manager	CEM
Institute of Actuaries of Australia	Associate	AIAA
Institute of Actuaries of Australia	Fellow	FIAA
Institute of Certified Management Accountants	Certified Management Accountant	CMA
Institute of Certified Management Accountants	Certified Global Business Analyst	CGBA
Institute of Chartered Shipbrokers	Fellow	FICS
Institute of Chartered Shipbrokers	Member	MICS
Institute of Community Directors Australia	Certified Community Director	CCDir
Institute of Community Directors Australia	Associate Member	AMICDA
Institute of Community Directors Australia	Fellow	FICDA
Institute of Community Directors Australia	Member	MICDA
Institute of Foresters of Australia (IFA)	Member	MIFA
Institute of Foresters of Australia (IFA)	Fellow	FIFA
Institute of Foresters of Australia (IFA)	Registered Professional Forester	RPF
Institute of Management Consultants (IMC Australia)	Associate Member	AIMC
Institute of Management Consultants (IMC Australia)	Full Member	MIMC
Institute of Management Consultants (IMC Australia)	Fellow Member	FIMC
Institute of Management Consultants (IMC Australia)	Certified Management Consultant	CMC
Institute of Managers and Leaders Australia and New Zealand	Affiliate	IMLa
Institute of Managers and Leaders Australia and New Zealand	Member	MIML
Institute of Managers and Leaders Australia and New Zealand	Associate Fellow	AFIML
Institute of Managers and Leaders Australia and New Zealand	Fellow	FIML
Institute of Managers and Leaders Australia and New Zealand	Chartered Manager	CMgr
Institute of Professional Editors (IPEd)	Accredited Editor	AE
Institute of Professional Editors (IPEd)	Distinguished Editor	DE
Institute of Public Accountants (Note: formerly the National Institute of Accountants)	Fellow	FIPA
Institute of Public Accountants	Member	MIPA
Institute of Public Accountants	Associate	AIPA
Institute of Public Accountants (Aus) & Institute of Financial Accountants (UK)	Fellow, IPA and Fellow Financial Accountant, IFA	FIPA FFA
Institute of Public Accountants (Aus) & Institute of Financial Accountants (UK)	Member, IPA and Associate Financial Accountant, IFA	MIPA AFA
Institute of Public Accountants (Aus) & Institute of Financial Accountants (UK)	Associate, IPA and Intermediate Financial Accountant, IFA	AIPA IFA
Institute of Public Administration Australia	Member	MIPAA
Institute of Public Administration Australia	National Fellow	FIPAA
Institute of Public Administration Australia	Fellow IPPA, Victoria	FIPAA (VIC)
Institute of Public Administration Australia	Fellow IPPA, Western Australia	FIPAA (WA)
New South Wales Operating Theatre Association	Member	MNSWOTA
Pharmacy Guild of Australia	Member	PGAM
Planning Institute Australia	Student Member	PIA (Assoc.)
Planning Institute Australia	Graduate Member	PIA (Assoc.)
Planning Institute Australia	Affiliate Member	PIA (Assoc.)
Planning Institute Australia	Full Member	MPIA
Planning Institute Australia	Registered Planner	RPIA
Planning Institute Australia	Fellow	MPIA (Fellow)
Planning Institute Australia	Registered Planner (Fellow)	RPIA (Fellow)
Planning Institute Australia	Life Fellow	MPIA (Life Fellow)
Planning Institute Australia	Registered Planner (Life Fellow)	RPIA (Life Fellow)
Planning Institute Australia	Honorary Fellow	PIA (Hon Fellow)
Public Relations Institute of Australia	Fellow	FPRIA
Public Relations Institute of Australia	Life Fellow	LFPRIA
Public Relations Institute of Australia	Member	MPRIA
Public Relations Institute of Australia	Associate	APRIA
Professionals Australia	Registered Professional Engineer	RPEng
Queensland Law Society	Member	MQLS
Registered Paramedic	AHPRA Registered Paramedic	RP
Risk Management Institute of Austalasia	Member	MRMIA
Risk Management Institute of Austalasia	Certified Practising Risk Associate	RMIA CPRA
Risk Management Institute of Austalasia	Certified Practising Risk Manager	RMIA CPRM
Risk Management Institute of Austalasia	Certified Chief Risk Officer	RMIA CCRO
Risk Management Institute of Austalasia	RMIA Certificate IV in Integrated Risk Management	RMIA Cert IV IRM
Risk Management Institute of Austalasia	RMIA Diploma of Integrated Risk Management	RMIA Dip IRM
Royal Aeronautical Society	Member	MRAes
Royal Aeronautical Society	Fellow	FRAes
Royal Australasian College of Dental Surgeons	Fellow	FRACDS
Royal Australasian College of Medical Administrators	Fellow	FRACMA
Royal Australasian College of Medical Administrators	Associate Fellow	AFRACMA
Royal Australasian College of Physicians	Fellow	FRACP
Royal Australasian College of Surgeons	Fellow	FRACS
Royal Australian College of General Practitioners	Fellow	FRACGP
Royal Australian and New Zealand College of Obstetricians and Gynaecologists	Fellow	FRANZCOG
Royal Australian and New Zealand College of Obstetricians and Gynaecologists	Associate (Advanced Procedural)	ARANZCOG (Adv.P)
Royal Australian and New Zealand College of Obstetricians and Gynaecologists	Associate (Procedural)	ARANZCOG (P)
Royal Australian and New Zealand College of Obstetricians and Gynaecologists	Advanced Diplomate	DRANZCOG (Adv.)
Royal Australian and New Zealand College of Obstetricians and Gynaecologists	Diplomate	DRANZCOG
Royal Australian and New Zealand College of Obstetricians and Gynaecologists	Diplomate (historical)	DipRACOG
Royal Australian and New Zealand College of Obstetricians and Gynaecologists	Certificant	ARANZCOG (Cert)
Royal Australian and New Zealand College of Ophthalmologists	Fellow	FRANZCO
Royal Australian and New Zealand College of Psychiatrists	Fellow	FRANZCP
Royal Australian and New Zealand College of Radiologists	Fellow	FRANZCR
Royal Australian Chemical Institute	Fellow	FRACI
Royal Australian Chemical Institute	Member	MRACI
Royal Australian Chemical Institute	Chartered Chemist	CChem
Royal Australian Historical Society	Fellow	FRAHS
Royal College of Nursing Australia	Fellow (historical)	FRCNA
Royal College of Nursing Australia	Member (historical)	MRCNA
Royal College of Pathologists of Australasia	Fellow	FRCPA
Royal College of Pathologists of Australasia	Fellow of the Faculty of Oral Pathologists	FFOP
Royal Historical Society of Victoria	Fellow	FRHSV
Royal Society of New South Wales	Distinguished Fellow	Dist FRSN
Royal Society of New South Wales	Fellow	FRSN
Royal Society of New South Wales	Member	MRSN
Royal Society of Victoria	Fellow	FRSV
Royal Society of Victoria	Member	MRSV
Royal Society of Western Australia	Member	MRSWA
Royal Victorian Association of Honorary Justices	Fellow	FRAVHJ
Royal Zoological Society of New South Wales	Fellow	FRZSNSW
Safety Governance Institute	Member	SGIM
School Counselling and Psychology Association New South Wales	Member	MSCPA
School Counselling and Psychology Association New South Wales	Associate Member	AssocMSCPA
Society of Trust and Estate Practitioners	Full Member	TEP
Society of British & Commonwealth Entrepreneurs	Honorary Fellow	HonFSBCE
Society of British & Commonwealth Entrepreneurs	Honorary Member	HonMSBCE
Society of British & Commonwealth Entrepreneurs	Fellow	FSBCE
Society of British & Commonwealth Entrepreneurs	Member	MSBCE
Speech Pathology Australia	Member	MSPA
Speech Pathology Australia	Certified Practising Speech Pathologist	CPSP
Tax Institute (Australia)	Fellow	FTI
Tax Institute (Australia)	Associate	ATI
Tax Institute (Australia)	Chartered Tax Adviser	CTA
The Teachers' Guild of New South Wales	Member	MTGN
The Warren Centre for Advanced Engineering	Fellow	FTWC
The Warren Centre for Advanced Engineering	Companion	CTWC
The Winston Churchill Memorial Trust	Churchill Fellow	CF
Wounds Australia	Full Member	MWA
Wounds Australia	Associate Member	AMWA
Wounds Australia	Fellow	FWA

== Other offices ==
Legislators
Member of the Australian House of Representatives	MP
Member of the Legislative Assembly (NSW, Vic, Qld)	MP
Member of the Legislative Assembly (WA, ACT, NT)	MLA
Member of the Legislative Council (NSW, SA, Tas, Vic, WA)	MLC
Member of the House of Assembly (Tas, SA)	MP
Vice-Regal
Aide-de-Camp to the Governor-General or State Governor	ADC
Service
Officer of the Royal Australian Navy	RAN
Recipient of Her Majesty The Queen's Gold Medal	QM
Graduate of the Command and Staff College	psc
Graduate of the Command and Staff College (Reserve)	psc(r)
Graduate Australian Technical Staff Officer's Course 1992–2008	qtc
Graduate Capability Technology Management College	CTMC
Approved retired ADF Officers	(Retd)

Australian Army Corps abbreviations (RAAC, RAE, RAInf, etc.) are not recognised as postnominals although they are occasionally seen.

== See also ==
- Lists of post-nominal letters
