= Shuan Hern Lee =

- Born: July 19, 2002 (age 23); Perth, Western Australia, Australia
- Occupation: Pianist
- Musical career
- Genres: Classical
- Label: Musideco Classical
- Website: shuanhernlee.net

Shuan Hern Lee (simplified Chinese: 李宣恒; traditional Chinese: 李宣恆; pinyin: Lǐ Xuānhéng; born 19 July 2002) is an Australian classical pianist.

== Early life ==
Shuan Hern Lee was born in Perth, Western Australia to parents Yoon Sen Lee and Ivy Chan. Both his parents are also pianists, his father (Yoon Sen Lee) from Singapore and mother (Ivy Chan) from China.

Shuan started his musical journey when he was just 2 1/2 years old. He was quick to pick up playing piano, and was one of the semi-finalists of Australia's Got Talent in 2010, at the age of 7, and Voice Kids Australia in 2014, where he sang Pie Jesu. When he was 9, he had obtained his Associate Diploma of the Trinity College of London (ATCL) in piano performance then went on to obtain his Associated Board of the Royal Schools of Music and the Licentiate in Music, Australia (LMusA), both with Distinction in piano performance, at the age of 10. When he was 14, he obtained the Fellowship in Music, Australia (FMusA) diploma in piano performance of the AMEB.

At the age of 16, Shuan began a music degree at the University of Western Australia.

== Career ==
Lee has performed with many orchestras including: the National Symphony Orchestra of Ukraine, Minnesota Symphony Orchestra, Armenia State Philharmonic Orchestra, Armenia State Chamber Orchestra, Novosibirsk Philharmonic Orchestra, Imola Chamber Orchestra, Fremantle Symphony Orchestra, Perth Symphony Orchestra, Metropolitan Symphony Orchestra (Perth), and the West Australian Symphony Orchestra

=== Competitions and awards ===
2012:

1st prize:

- Chopin International Piano Competition (Hartford, Connecticut, US)

2013:

1st prize:

- Astana Piano Passion, Kazakhstan
- Sberbank Debut International Piano Competition Ukraine

2nd prize:

- Horowitz International Piano Competition, Ukraine.

2014:

- AMP Tomorrow's Maker Fund Award Recipient (Youngest)

2015:

1st prize + Tchaikovsky Prize:

- Young Pianist of the North International Piano Competition in UK

5th prize

- Youngest finalist at International Tchaikovsky Competition for Young Musicians in Novosibirsk

2016:

1st prize:

- San Marino International Piano Competition (15 and under)
- International Piano Competition for Young Musicians in Enschede, The Netherlands (+Audience Prize)

2017:

1st prize:

- International Junior E-Piano Competition in Minnesota USA(+Best Variations prize)

2019:

- Winner of Cliburn International Junior Piano Competition in Dallas, Texas

== Albums ==
Shuan Hern has recorded three CD albums, Musical Adventures 1 (2011) and Musical Adventures 2(2014)and had his latest album in 2019, Grand Prix du Concours International de Piano “Ville de Gagny”, released by Musideco Classical and available on Spotify. Grand Prix du Concours International de Piano “Ville de Gagny”, (Édition 2019 [Live Recording])

== Personal life ==
Shuan is a student of the International Piano Academy In contri Col Maestro of Imola, Italy and is currently studying with Yoon Sen Lee and Ingrid Fliter.

His hobbies are playing table tennis and nerf guns, and he also loves writing poetry and studying philosophy.

His favourite composers are Johann Sebastian Bach and Chopin.
