= Judy Hall (pianist) =

Australian pianist and musician

Judy Hall OAM
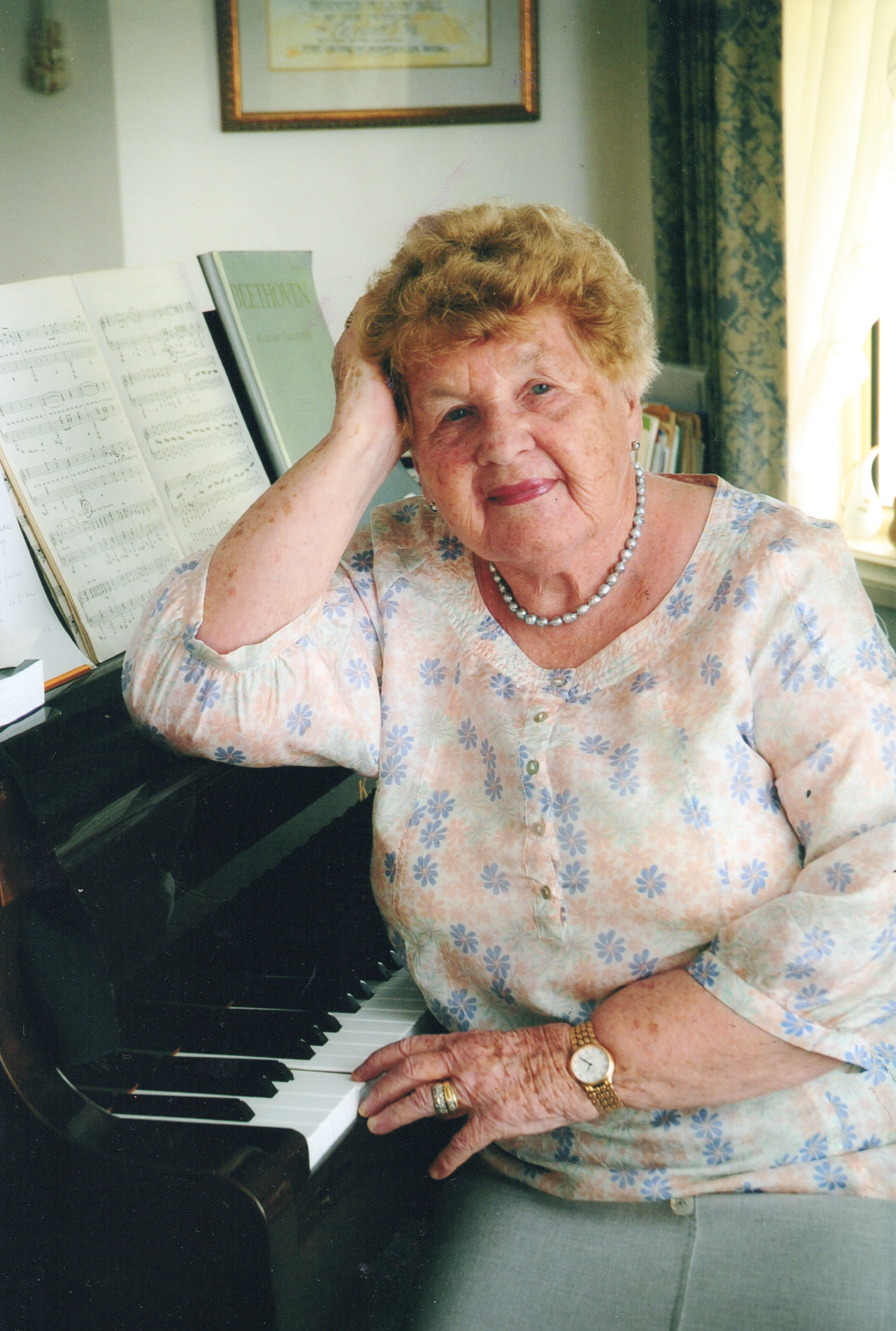
- Hall pictured at her home in 2011
- Born: Evelyn Margaret Mary Baillie; 2 July 1922 (age 104); Trafalgar, Victoria, Australia
- Occupations: Piano teacher; musician
- Years active: 1946–present
- Spouse: Cedric Hall (m. 1944; died 2008)
- Children: 3

Evelyn Margaret Mary "Judy" Hall OAM (née Baillie; born 2 July 1922) is an Australian pianist and musician. She has taught as a piano teacher in Gippsland, Victoria, since 1946, producing students of international fame.

== Early life and education ==
Hall was born in the town of Trafalgar, Victoria. She was one of four children to Daniel Baillie and Mary Larsen. Her first musical exposure was by that of her father who was a professional cornet player and bandmaster. Her exposure to music was further developed as her family purchased a radio in the 1930s, serving as a source of discovering classical music.

Hall attended Trafalgar State School and Warragul High School. At a young age, she would sit at her father's piano and play by ear, with the support of her father teaching her the foundations of music, albeit informally. From an early age, her ability at the piano became apparent and she was awarded a scholarship granting her six months of tuition. At the age of twelve, she began to have formal music lessons. Her early piano teachers were reported to be numerous and of low standard, Hall stating that "I made a pledge... that I would never let another child experience such wasted years." At the age of fifteen, Hall left the Warragul High School, continuing her education at the St. Joseph's convent in Trafalgar, where she studied bookkeeping, typing and music. As Hall's musical abilities advanced, she sought to improve her piano technique. Edward Goll had taught Hall's past teacher Margaret Smallacombe, who then referred Hall to Goll, becoming his pupil at the age of 19. Goll, a renowned Czech-Australian concert pianist, was a great influence on Hall musically. From the age of 19 she would have to find a means to travel some 120 km from Trafalgar to Melbourne for lessons. She continued lessons with him for three years until her marriage in 1944.

== Career ==
=== Musical teaching and service ===
In 1946, Hall began giving piano lessons. Her successes as a teacher were found in her attention to establishing a formidable technical foundation early in a student's development. Her teaching ability was proven in the multitude of her students who passed examinations and competed in eisteddfods, with seventy-six major awards and scholarships granted. Whilst studying under Hall, thirty-two of her students received the Associate in Music Australia (AMusA) and four the Licentiate in Music Australia (LMusA) issued by the Australian Music Examinations Board (AMEB).

Throughout her career, Hall has travelled internationally in aid of her professional development visiting 26 different countries. She has both presented and attended a number of lectures, workshops and written articles on piano technique.

In 1979, Italian pianist Professor Lidia Baldecchi-Arcuri gave a series of five lectures in Sydney on the importance of the foundations of musical education. These lectures were succeeded by a further twelve visits to Australia and subsequent visits by Hall to Baldecchi-Arcuri's home in Genoa, Italy. Hall gained a new insight into piano technique and a proper way of interpreting a musical score. In an interview, Hall stated "I thought: 'that's the best thing that ever happened in my life'", when asked about her relations with Baldecchi-Arcuri.

Succeeding her studies with Baldecchi-Arcuri, Hall sought to write her own book on the fundamentals of piano technique. The book, entitled "The First Three Years," documented piano technique at an anatomical level. Such techniques included relaxation of the shoulders and whole body, wrist, hand and finger positions, the fingers' individual strengths and deficiencies, and how to overcome them.

Over her career, Hall has done a number of community performances as a pianist including for the Country Women's Association, local fire brigades, football clubs, private recitals and playing with her chamber group 'Judy and Friends' at local nursing homes. She often accompanied at local eisteddfods and sponsored sections including a movement from a piano concerto and a complete piano sonata.

At the age of 60, Hall began learning to play the cello. In the succeeding years, she played as a cellist in chamber music groups, as part of local orchestras and in accompanying the Latrobe Valley Operatic Society.

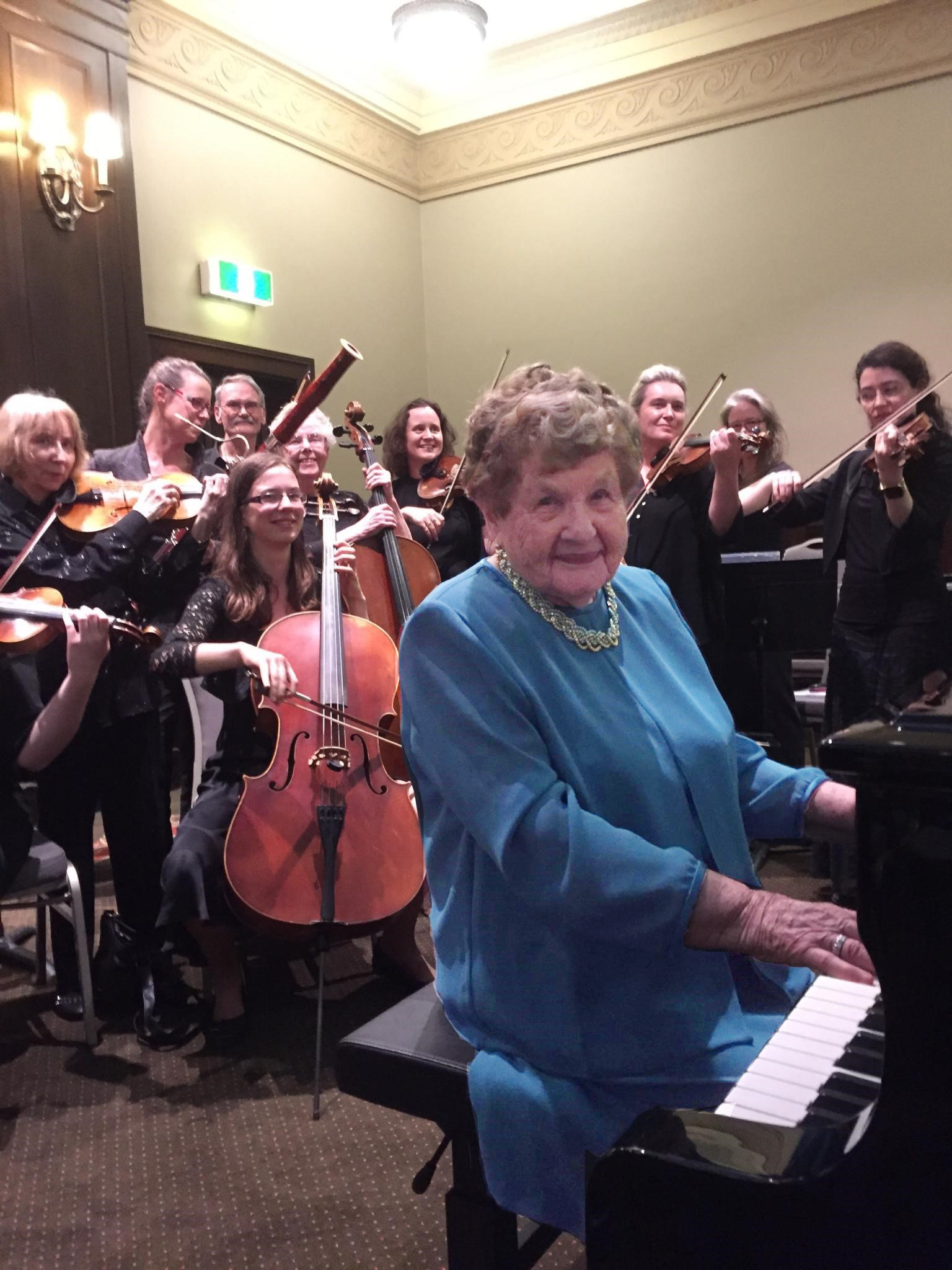
Hall with the Gippsland Symphony Orchestra at her Melbourne Town Hall performance in 2019

=== Performances ===
On 14 November 1996, at age 74, Hall performed Ludwig van Beethoven's Piano Concerto No. 3 with the Latrobe Orchestra at the Latrobe Regional Gallery in Morwell.

In 2012, a concert was hosted on the occasion of Hall's 90th birthday at the Gippsland Christian Church in Moe featuring herself, many of her past students and family. The concert lasted four and a half hours.

On 10 April 2015, Hall again performed Beethoven's Piano Concerto No. 3, however, this time the first movement was omitted. The performance took place at the Wesley of Warragul.

In 2018, at age 96, Hall performed the 2nd movement, Larghetto, from Frédéric Chopin's Piano Concerto No. 2 a number of times. On April 29, she performed it in Sale, in May she performed it in Warragul and on November 18 she fulfilled her childhood dream of performing in the Melbourne Town Hall.

On 8 February 2019, Hall performed at a Gala Concert hosted by the Melbourne Recital Centre in celebration of their 10th anniversary. She performed alongside her previous students Timothy Young and Alexander Waite in an arrangement of Franz Liszt's Hungarian Rhapsody No. 2 for two pianos and six hands.

Hall began gaining public acclaim at the time of her Melbourne Town Hall appearance. She was interviewed by a number of local and national newspapers and television news stations. Well documented during this publicity was her continuing ability to teach, perform and have a desire to learn new technique and repertoire in her mid-late 90s.

Hall turned 100 on 2 July 2022.

== Awards ==
On 11 June 1996, Hall was awarded the Medal of the Order of Australia for her service to music education in the Latrobe Valley during the previous 50 years.

In 2011, Hall was the recipient of the Distinguished Teachers Award by the Victorian Music Teachers' Association (VMTA).

In 2019, Hall was recognised by the VMTA with Life Membership of the Victoria Music Teachers' Association.

== Notable students ==
- Dr Paul Rickard-Ford – Senior lecturer of piano and faculty member at the Sydney Conservatorium of Music.
- Timothy Young – Head of Piano at the Australian National Academy of Music and a founding member of Ensemble Liaison.
- Dr Pamela Burnard – Professor of Arts, Creativities and Educations at the University of Cambridge.
- Paul Fitzsimon – Chorus master at Opera Australia.
- Vanessa Scammell – Conductor for Opera Australia and The Australian Ballet.
- Alexander Waite – Licentiate in Music Australia.
