= Sulara Nanayakkara =

Sri Lankan violinist

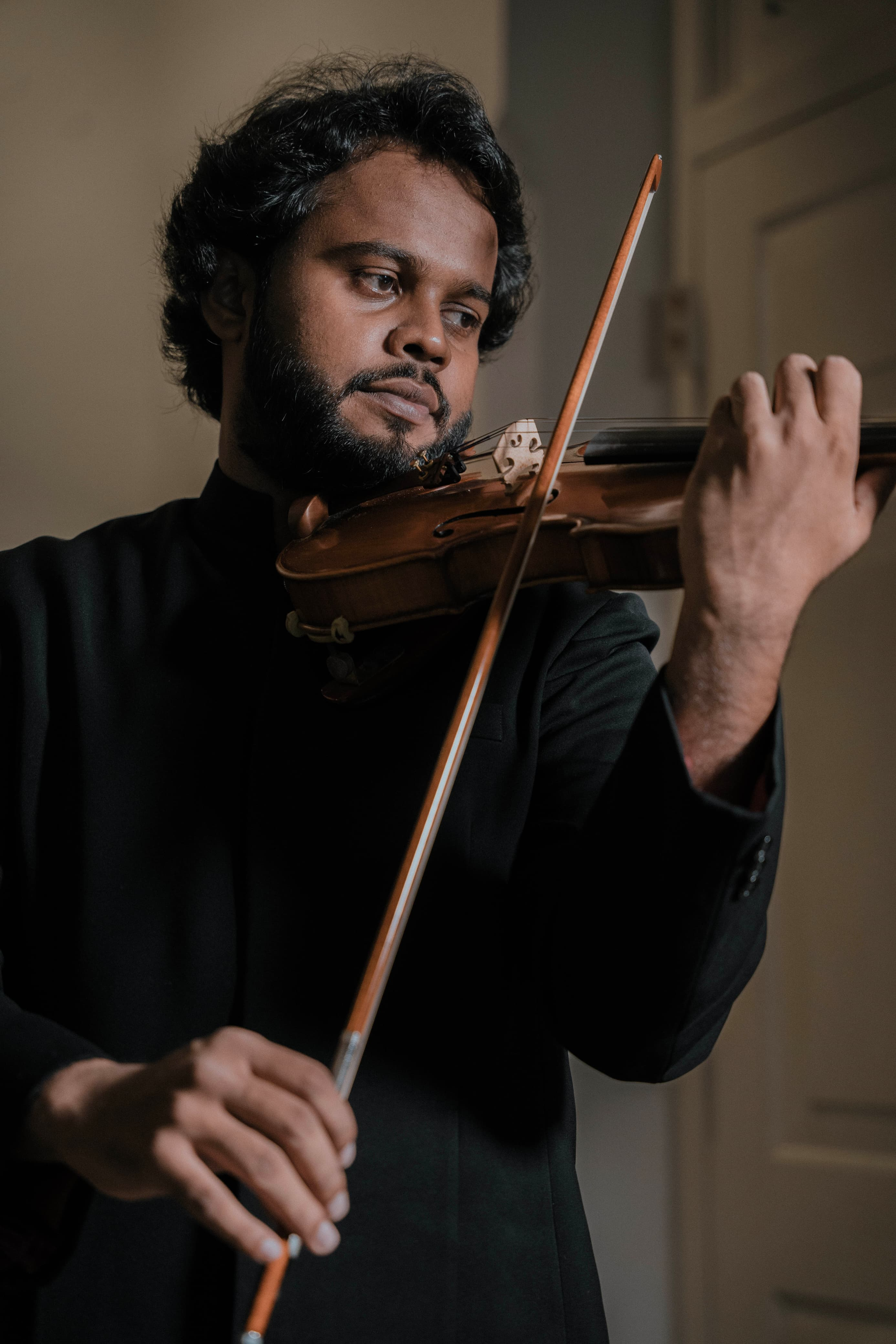
- Education: Temple University (MMus in Violin Performance)
- Occupation: Violinist

Sulara Ferdinand Nanayakkara is a Sri Lankan violinist and music educator. He has performed internationally and is noted for his classical music collaborations. Sulara is also active in music outreach and education in Sri Lanka. He is the Principal Second Violinist of the Chamber Music Society of Colombo.

== Early life and education ==
Sulara began studying the violin at the age of five under Lal Perera and subsequently with Lakshman Joseph de Saram, and Ananda Dabare. At eight years old, he won the Gold Medal and overall title at the Sri Lanka Festival of Music, Dance, and Speech conducted by the British and International Federation for Music—a distinction he maintained for ten consecutive years.

In 2012, Sulara was chosen by the Symphony Orchestra of Sri Lanka as the youngest member to go on a musical study tour to the United Kingdom. There he performed in the Sidcup Orchestra.

Sulara holds a Master of Music in Violin Performance from the Boyer College of Music and Dance at Temple University, Philadelphia, where he studied violin performance under Meichen Liao-Barnes and Eduard Schmieder, and violin pedagogy, performance and chamber music with Lambert Orkis.

== Career ==
=== Performance ===
Sulara has performed in notable venues such as Verizon Hall at the Kimmel Center for the Performing Arts and Rock Hall Recital Auditorium in Philadelphia, and Alice Tully Hall at Lincoln Center for the Performing Arts, New York City. For Sulara's final Master's violin recital in the USA, he collaborated with Mark Livshits, a Grammy-nominated concert pianist and acclaimed chamber musician.

In 2022, Sulara collaborated with Olga Šroubková, the 2nd prize recipient of the 2018 Isaac Stern International Violin Competition and former 1st Concertmaster of the Czech Philharmonic Orchestra, to perform Bach's double violin concerto with the Chamber Music Society of Colombo, led by its artistic director, Lakshman Joseph de Saram.

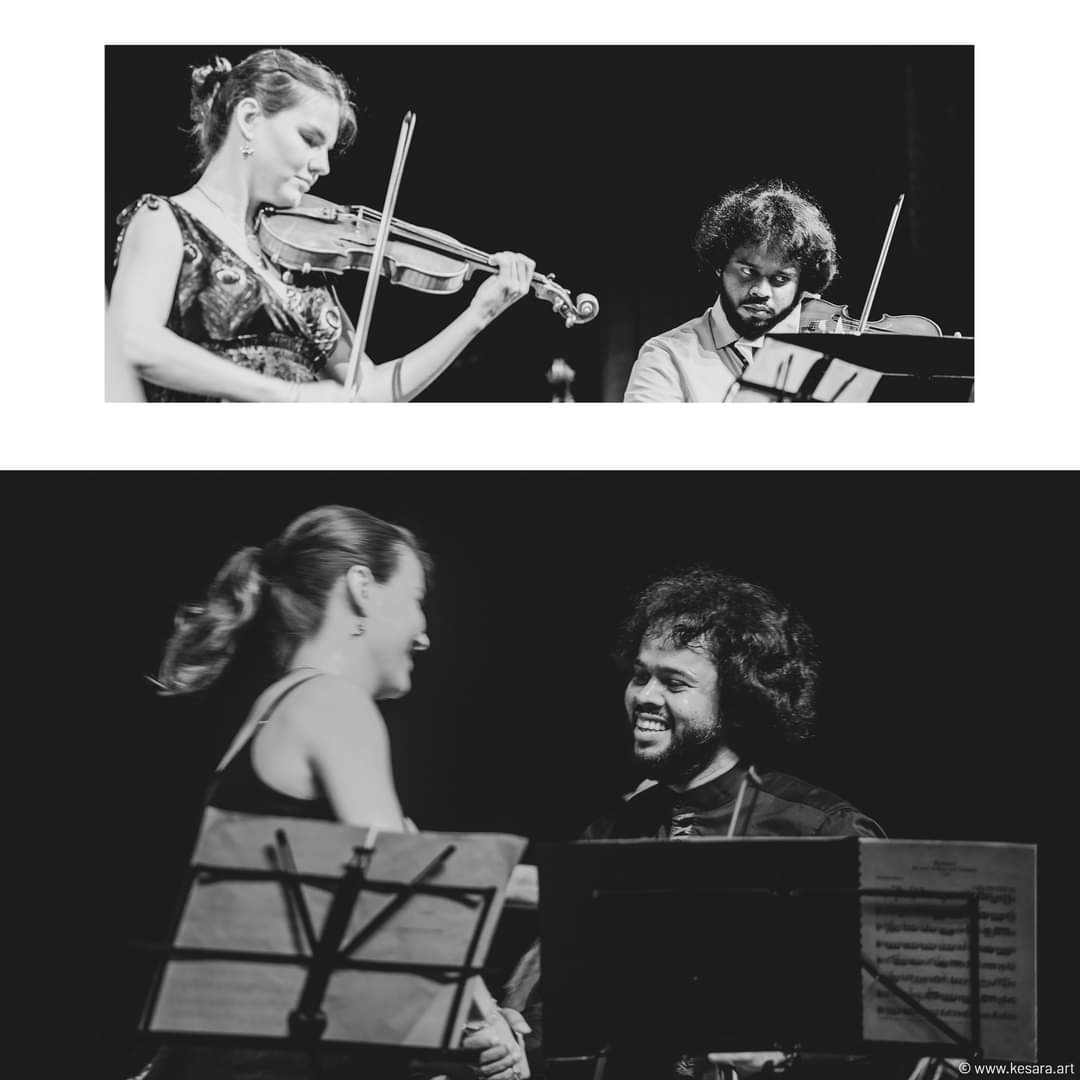
Sulara performing with Olga Šroubková

In 2023, Sulara presented the Sri Lankan premiere of Felix Mendelssohn’s rarely performed Violin Concerto in D minor with the Chamber Music Society of Colombo. Sulara's notable collaborative performances encompass a 2015 London engagement with British-Sri Lankan cellist Rohan de Saram, a 2024 performance in Sri Lanka with Steinway Artist and Sri Lankan-American pianist Sujeeva Hapugalle, and a 2024 violin and piano duo recital at the Lionel Wendt Theatre with Johann Peiris, a prominent Sri Lankan collaborative pianist.

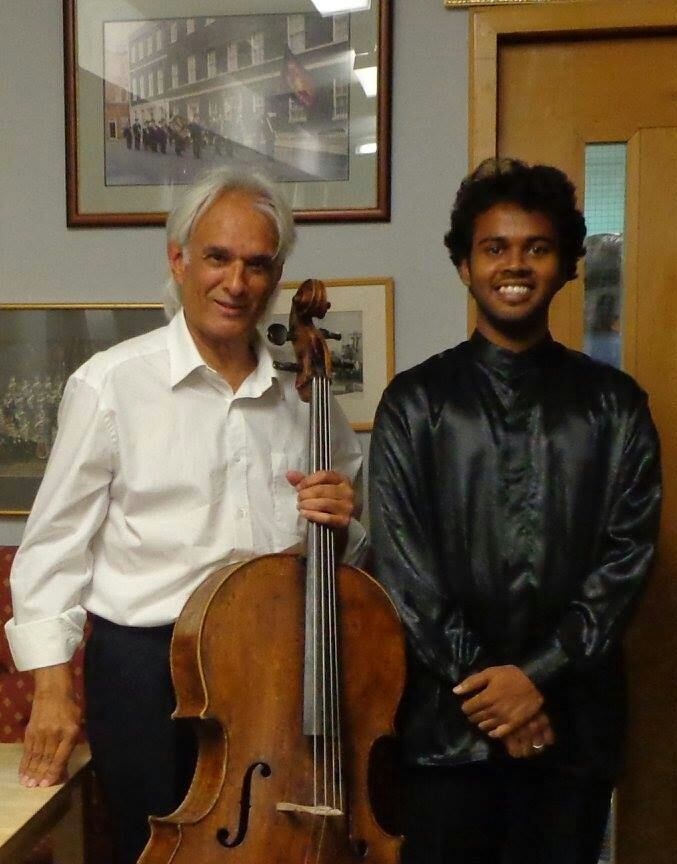
Sulara with Rohan de Saram in 2015

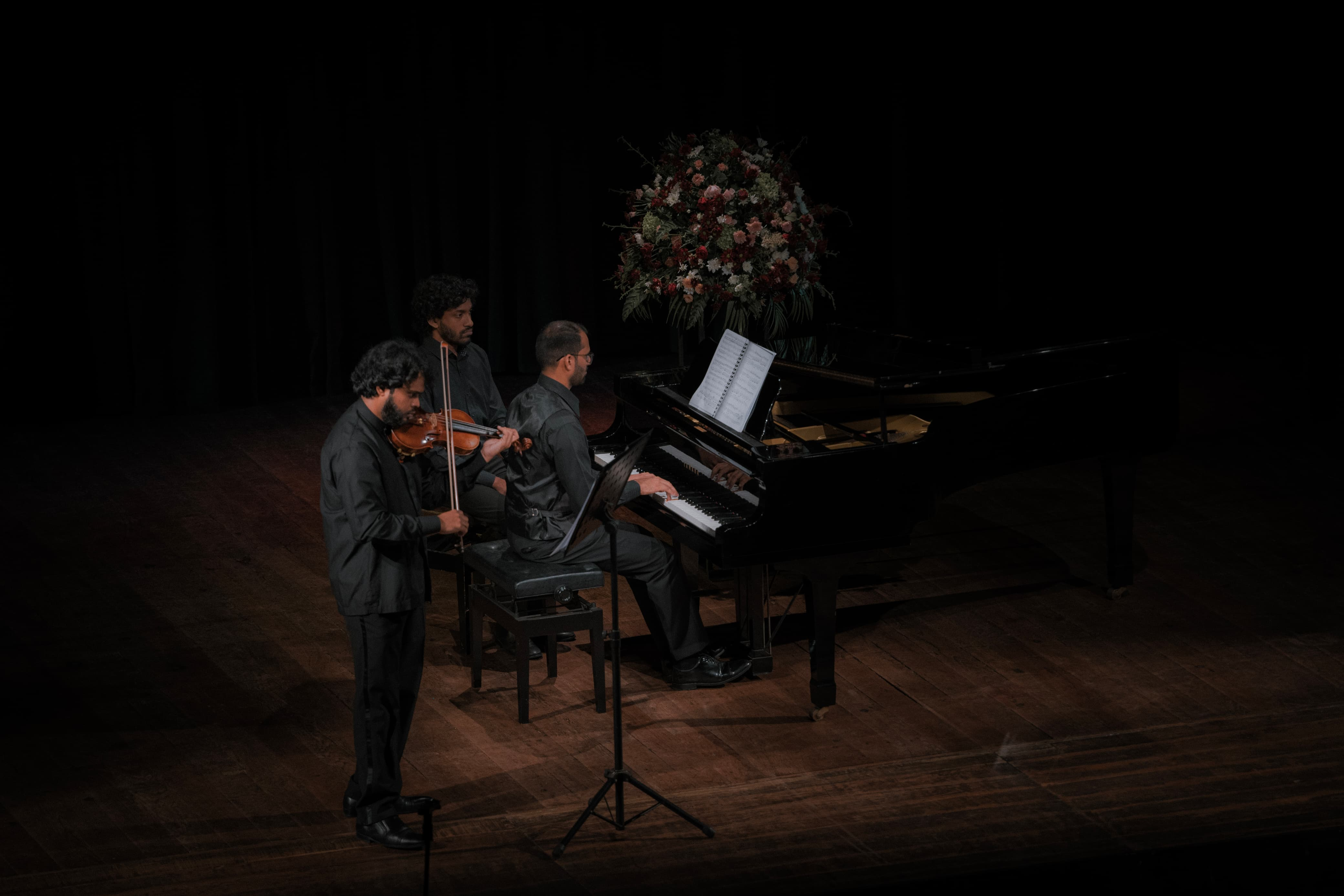
Sulara Performing with Johann Pieiris at the Lionel Wendt Theater in 2024

He is currently the Principal Second Violinist of the Chamber Music Society of Colombo and was one of the former co-leaders of the Symphony Orchestra of Sri Lanka.

In the realm of film and television music, Sulara was the youngest violinist to perform under Premasiri Khemadasa, contributing to numerous Sri Lankan soundtracks. In 2007 Sulara performed in the orchestra of Agni, Khemadasa's final opera.

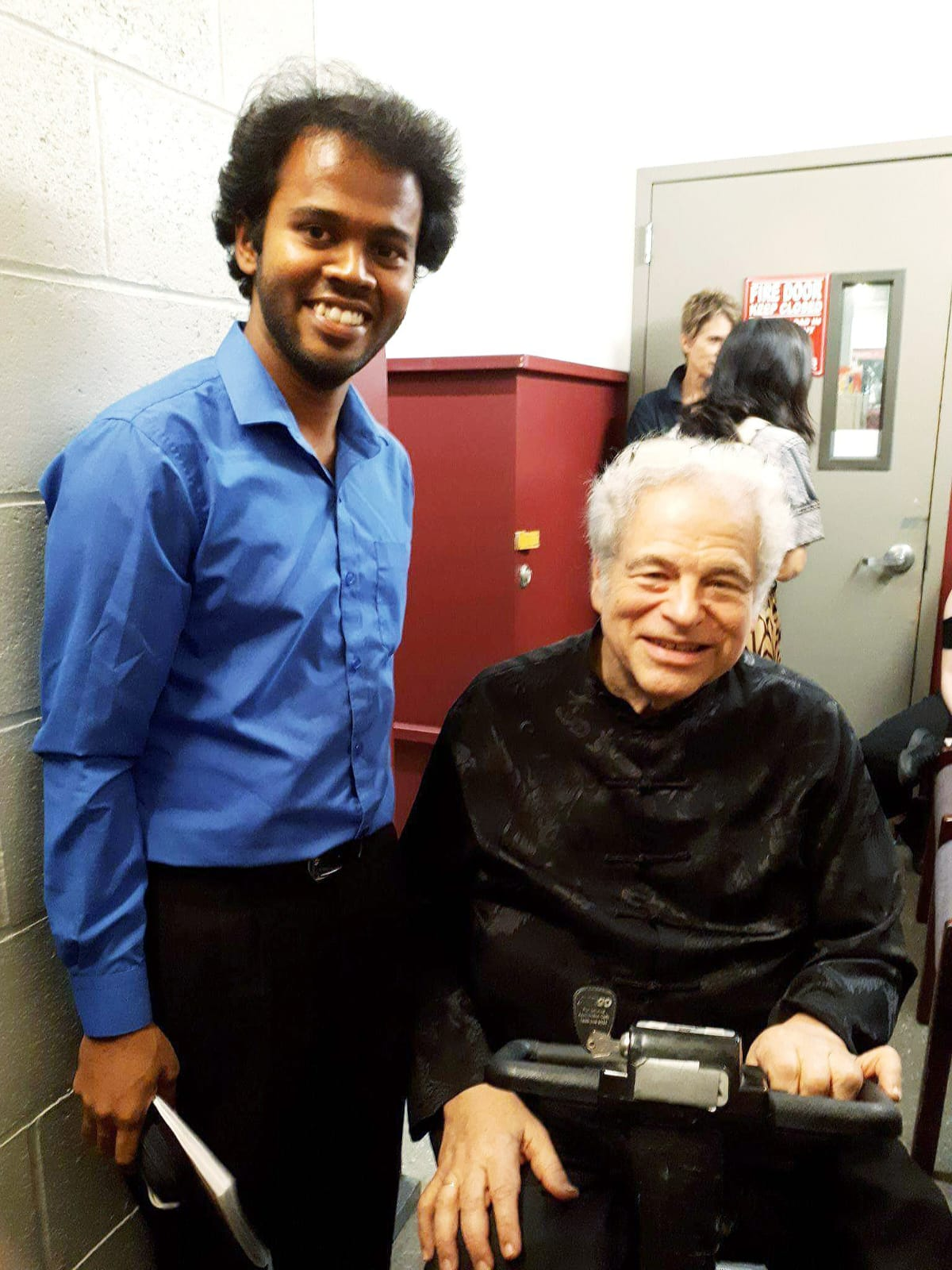
Sulara with Itzhak Perlman

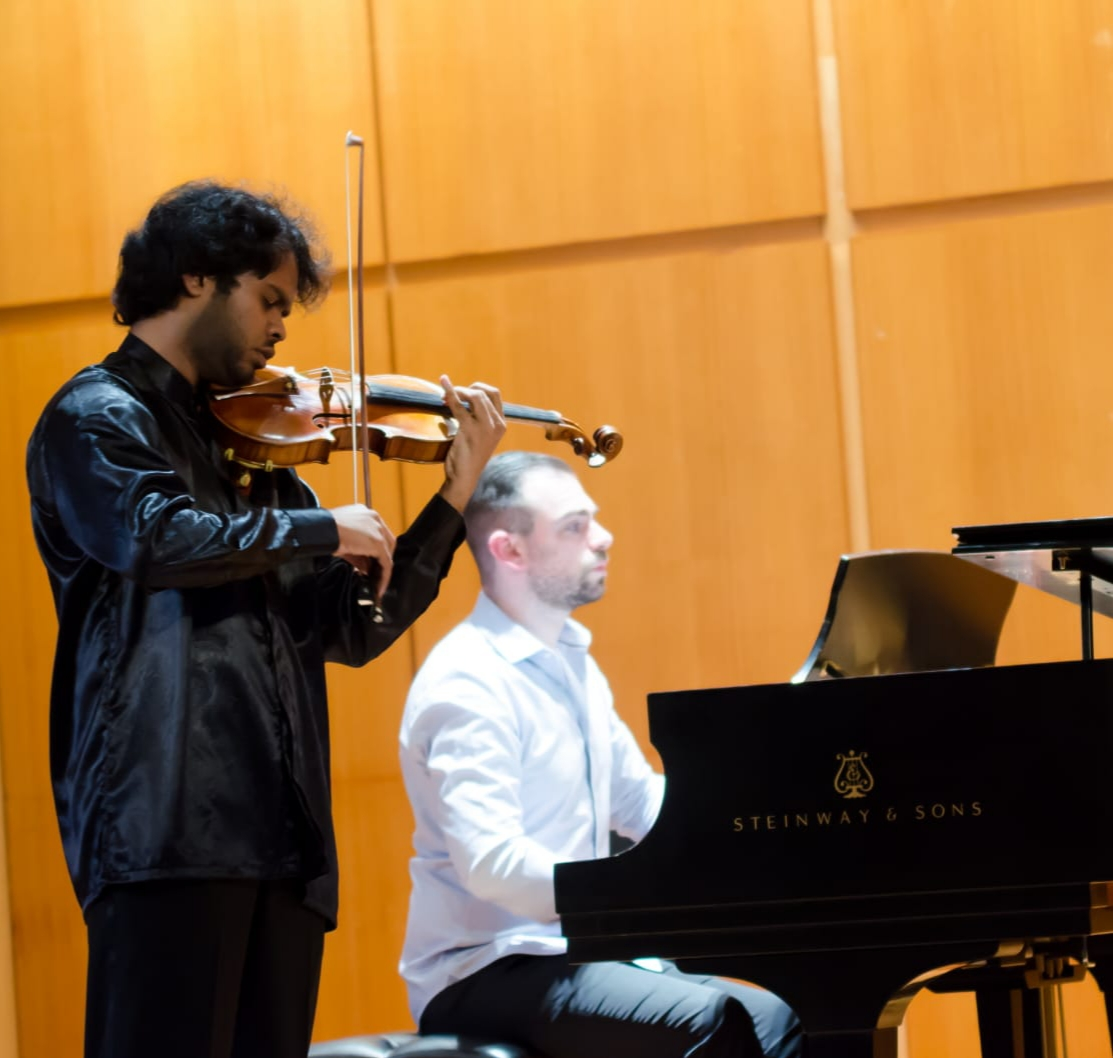
Sulara collaborating with Grammy-nominated pianist Dr. Mark Livshits

=== Awards and recognition ===
According to the Sunday Times and Daily Mirror, Sulara performed as first violinist with the Temple University Symphony Orchestra on the recording of Constant Renaissance, which was nominated for two Grammy Awards (Best Instrumental Composition; Best Arrangement, Instrumental or A Cappella) in 2019.

Sulara was awarded the Fulbright Scholarship to pursue postgraduate studies in the United States and was also named an honorary fellow of the Australian Guild of Music.

=== Teaching and mentorship ===
Sulara has served as a visiting lecturer in violin at the University of the Visual and Performing Arts, Sri Lanka. He maintains a private violin studio in Sri Lanka. In 2023, he was invited to serve as a jury member for the 13th annual Con Brio Violin Competition, held at the National Centre for the Performing Arts (NCPA) in Mumbai, India.
