= Intensive Care Foundation =

Australian medical charity

The Australian and New Zealand Intensive Care Foundation (ICF) is a charitable organisation established in 1990, dedicated to improving the care, treatment, and quality of life for critically ill patients in Australia and New Zealand. Its ultimate aim is to enhance both the number and quality of lives saved in intensive care units (ICUs).

== History ==
The modern specialty of intensive care began in 1952-53, stimulated by the polio epidemic in Denmark, which led to research into mechanical ventilation. The first recognisable ICU in Australasia was founded in Auckland Hospital New Zealand in 1958 followed by the first general ICU in Australia at St Vincent’s Melbourne in 1961. The Australian and New Zealand Intensive Care Society (ANZICS) was formed in 1974 and intensive care was recognised as a subspecialty of medicine and anaesthesia in 1980. The Intensive Care Foundation was officially formed in 1990 by ANZICS, the College of Intensive Care Medicine (CICM), and the Australian College of Critical Care Nurses (ACCCN).

== Activities and impact ==
The ICF funds research and education projects focused on improving patient care in ICUs, with an emphasis on increasing survival rates and enhancing recovery outcomes. It provides "seed funding" for pilot studies and pre-clinical trials, which are often difficult to obtain elsewhere, helping young investigators establish their profiles. Many of these pilot studies have successfully attracted significant government and philanthropic funding.

Since its inception, the ICF has funded over 140 research projects, contributing almost $5 million in grants to the intensive care community across Australia and New Zealand. These grants support researchers and educators from various fields, including nursing, medicine, physiotherapy, dietetics, pharmacy, social work, and other allied health disciplines.

Australia and New Zealand are recognized as global leaders in intensive care, boasting impressive patient outcomes. In 2023, survival rates for adult ICU patients exceeded 90%, while children's ICU survival rates reached 97%. These figures contribute to significantly lower mortality rates in Australia (8%) and New Zealand (10%) compared to the global average of 13%. This progress has resulted in approximately 10,000 additional lives saved annually in Australia alone since the 1990s.

== Governance and structure ==
The Intensive Care Foundation is a legally independent charity with tax-exempt status in both Australia and New Zealand. It is registered with the Australian Charities and Not-for-profits Commission (ACNC) and holds Deductible Gift Recipient (DGR) status in Australia (ABN: 80130947581). In New Zealand, it is a registered charity with the New Zealand Charities Service (Registration number: CC22943, NZBN: 9429048306966).

The ICF is overseen by a Board of Directors composed of senior intensive care practitioners and corporate professionals who serve pro bono. The Board is supported by independent Scientific Review Committees which rigorously assess grant applications, and a Fundraising Committee. Key stakeholders include its three founding organizations: the Australian and New Zealand Intensive Care Society (ANZICS), the College of Intensive Care Medicine (CICM), and the Australian College of Critical Care Nurses (ACCCN).

== Funding ==
The ICF is a self-funded organisation with no government funding. Its administrative and operational costs are covered by its three partner organizations (ANZICS, CICM, and ACCCN), while the grants awarded are funded entirely by donor contributions.

In 2024, the ICF launched a goal to raise $10 million by 2029. This goal is supported by the establishment of the Intensive Care Future Fund, a protected investment fund where only the earnings are used for research and education grants, ensuring sustainable funding. Another key strategy is the ICF Corporate Co-operative, which brings together medical companies making multi-year pledges to support the Foundation's work and cover administrative costs related to expanding fundraising efforts.

The Intensive Care Foundation funds research and educational initiatives to advance patient care and outcomes in intensive care units across Australia and New Zealand. The Foundation helps shape the future of critical care, ensuring more lives are saved and patients experience improved recovery.
