= Judy Hall =

Judy Hall may refer to:

- Judith Goslin Hall (born 1939), American and Canadian pediatrician, clinical geneticist and dysmorphologist
- Judy Hall (pianist) (born 1922), Australian pianist and musician
