= Australian order of wearing of honours awarded prior to 6 October 1992 =

Australia Imperial honours order

The Order of Wearing of Australian honours includes Imperial honours (those of the British Empire/United Kingdom) if they were awarded prior to 6 October 1992. Imperial honours awarded after 5 October 1992 are considered foreign.

For the Order of Wearing of Australian honours excluding Imperial honours, see Australian Honours Order of Wearing.

== Order of Wearing ==
Honours and Awards listed in bold print are:

- those within the Australian System of Honours and Awards;
- those conferred by The Sovereign in exercise of the Royal Prerogative;
- those within the Order of St John; and
- foreign awards, the acceptance and wearing of which have been authorised by the Governor-General.

Honours and Awards listed in unbolded print and marked with * are Imperial awards and are considered Australian if conferred prior to 6 October 1992. If conferred after 5 October 1992, Imperial awards are foreign and should be worn accordingly.

1. Victoria Cross/**Victoria Cross for Australia** VC
2. George Cross* GC
3. **Cross of Valour** CV
4. **Knight/Lady Companion of the Order of the Garter** KG/LG
5. **Knight/Lady of the Order of the Thistle** KT/LT
6. Knight/Dame Grand Cross of the Order of the Bath* GCB
7. **Member of the Order of Merit** OM (Civil Division and Military Division)
8. **Knight/Dame of the Order of Australia** AK/AD
9. Knight/Dame Grand Cross of the Order of St Michael and St George* GCMG
10. **Knight/Dame Grand Cross of the Royal Victorian Order** GCVO
11. Knight/Dame Grand Cross of the Order of the British Empire (Civil Division)* GBE (Military Division)*
12. **Companion of the Order of Australia** (General Division) AC (Military Division)
13. Member of the Order of the Companions of Honour* CH
14. Knight/Dame Commander of the Order of the Bath* KCB/DCB
15. Knight/Dame Commander of the Order of St Michael and St George* KCMG/DCMG
16. **Knight/Dame Commander of the Royal Victorian Order** KCVO/DCVO
17. Knight/Dame Commander of the Order of the British Empire* KBE/DBE (Military Division)*
18. Knight Bachelor* (Confers the title of "Sir" with no postnominals.)
19. **Officer of the Order of Australia** (General Division) AO (Military Division)
20. Companion of the Order of the Bath* CB
21. Companion of the Order of St Michael and St George* CMG
22. **Commander of the Royal Victorian Order** CVO
23. Commander of the Order of the British Empire* CBE (Military Division)*
24. **Star of Gallantry** SG
25. **Star of Courage** SC
26. Companion of the Distinguished Service Order* DSO
27. **Distinguished Service Cross** DSC
28. **Member of the Order of Australia** (General Division) AM (Military Division)
29. **Lieutenant of the Royal Victorian Order** LVO
30. Officer of the Order of the British Empire* OBE (Military Division)*
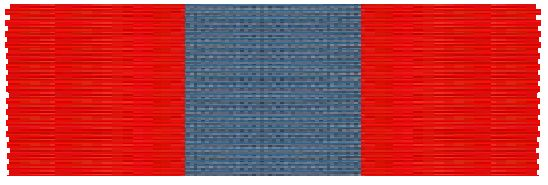
31. Companion of the Imperial Service Order* ISO
32. **Member of the Royal Victorian Order** MVO
33. Member of the Order of the British Empire* MBE (Military Division)*
34. **Conspicuous Service Cross** CSC
35. **Nursing Service Cross** NSC
36. Royal Red Cross (1st Class – Member)* RRC
37. Distinguished Service Cross* DSC (Imperial)
38. Military Cross* MC
39. Distinguished Flying Cross* DFC
40. Air Force Cross* AFC
41. Royal Red Cross (2nd Class – Associate)* ARRC
42. **Medal for Gallantry** MG
43. **Bravery Medal** BM
44. **Distinguished Service Medal** DSM
45. **Public Service Medal** PSM
46. **Australian Police Medal** APM
47. **Australian Fire Service Medal** AFSM
48. **Ambulance Service Medal** ASM
49. **Emergency Services Medal** ESM
50. **Australian Corrections Medal** ACM
51. **Medal of the Order of Australia** (General Division) OAM (Military Division)
52. **Order of St John**
53. Distinguished Conduct Medal* DCM
54. Conspicuous Gallantry Medal* CGM
55. George Medal* GM
56. **Conspicuous Service Medal** CSM
57. **Australian Antarctic Medal** AAM
58. King’s Police Medal for Gallantry* KPM
59. King’s Fire Service Medal for Gallantry* KFSM
60. Distinguished Service Medal* DSM (Imperial)
61. Military Medal* MM
62. Distinguished Flying Medal* DFM
63. Air Force Medal* AFM
64. Sea Gallantry Medal* SGM
65. Queen’s Gallantry Medal* QGM
66. **Royal Victorian Medal** RVM
67. British Empire Medal* BEM (Military Division)*
68. King’s Police Medal for Distinguished Service* KPM
69. King’s Fire Service Medal for Distinguished Service* KFSM
70. **Commendation for Gallantry**
71. **Commendation for Brave Conduct**
72. Queen’s Commendation for Brave Conduct*
73. **Commendation for Distinguished Service**
1. **War medals, campaign medals, active service medals and service medals (See Australian campaign medals)**
1. **Police Overseas Service Medal**
2. **Humanitarian Overseas Service Medal**
3. **National Emergency Medal**
4. **Civilian Service Medal 1939–1945**
5. **National Police Service Medal**
6. Polar Medal*
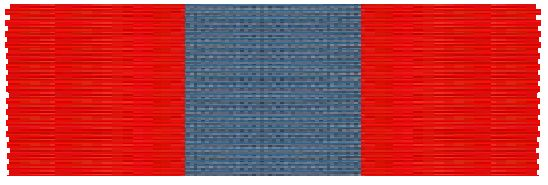
7. Imperial Service Medal*
8. **King Edward VII Coronation Medal** (1902)
9. **King George V Coronation Medal** (1911)
10. **King George V Silver Jubilee Medal** (1935)
11. **King George VI Coronation Medal** (1937)
12. **Queen Elizabeth II Coronation Medal** (1953)
13. **Queen Elizabeth II Silver Jubilee Medal** (1977)
14. **Queen Elizabeth II Golden Jubilee Medal** (2002)
15. **Queen Elizabeth II Diamond Jubilee Medal** (2012)
16. **Defence Force Service Medal**
17. **Reserve Force Decoration** RFD
18. **Reserve Force Medal**
19. **Defence Long Service Medal**
20. **National Medal**
21. **Australian Defence Medal**
22. **Australian Cadet Forces Service Medal**
23. **Champion Shots Medal**
24. **Long Service Medals** (Includes Imperial efficiency and long service awards.)
25. **Service Medal of the Order of St John**
26. **Anniversary of National Service 1951–1972 Medal**
27. Independence and Anniversary Medals* (in order of date of receipt)
28. **Foreign Awards** (in order of date of authorisation of their acceptance and wearing). (See Foreign Campaign Medals)

== See also ==
- Orders, decorations, and medals of Australia
- Post-nominal letters
- List of post-nominal letters (Australia)
- Australian Commendations
