= FRSM =

FRSM may refer to:

- Fellow of the Royal Society of Medicine.
- Fellow (or Fellowship) of the Associated Board of the Royal Schools of Music
