= Australia and New Zealand Academy of Management =

Founded in 1985, the Australian and New Zealand Academy of Management (ANZAM) is a professional body representing management educators, practitioners, and researchers in Australia and New Zealand (ANZ).

== Membership ==
Membership is open to individuals from ANZ and overseas, and institutions (most ANZ universities are members). Individual membership is recognized in five levels, with recognized Australian post-nominal letters:

1. ANZAM Life Fellow (ANZAM-L)
2. ANZAM Fellow (ANZAM-F)
3. ANZAM Professional Member (ANZAM-M)
4. ANZAM Retired Member (ANZAM-R)
5. ANZAM Associate Member ANZAM-A)

== Journal ==
Journal of Management and Organization (JMO), which is listed in the Social Sciences Citation Index.

== Annual conference ==
ANZAM Conducts an annual conference, normally in major cities in either Australia or New Zealand.

== International affiliation ==
ANZAM is affiliated with the (US-Based) Academy of Management.

== Presidents ==
- 2025-2026 - Ruth McPhail, Professor, Dean Engagement, Griffith University
- 2027-2028 - Sara Walton, Professor, Head of Department, Otago University
