= Music examination =

Assessment of musical instrument proficiency

Music examinations are a method of formally assessing the accomplishments of pupils learning musical instruments.

Trinity College London was the first organization to offer examinations in music to external students in 1877. Trinity College London conducts around 850,000 assessments per year worldwide. The Associated Board of the Royal Schools of Music conducts around 650,000 assessments per year in 93 countries.

== Eligibility ==
Many students who enter the music exams have taken a course of music lessons with a private tutor, although some are self-taught. Often this is a way for children to receive music training over and above what is provided at their usual place of learning, although private lessons are also popular with adults who turn to music later in life.

Although there are music examinations available to school and university students alongside other regular qualifications and assessments, there are also a number of independent bodies who solely provide assessments which are open to all.

== Content and structure ==
Music exams are set in both theory and practical aspects. The theory examinations are taken by pupils of all instruments and typically cover areas such as musical notation, harmony and composition. The practical exams concentrate on a particular instrument (i.e., piano, guitar, flute) and style of music (i.e., classical, jazz, popular). They cover elements such as playing set pieces, technical work including scales, sight reading, aural, musical knowledge and improvisation.

In the United Kingdom, graded music exams are offered at grades 1 to 8, with Grade 1 being the entry level, and Grade 8 being the standard required for entry to higher study in a music college. Some exam boards offer additional levels, before Grade 1 and/or after Grade 8. Different music exam boards may have different grade levels for instruments and music theory.

There are also music exams which do not follow the graded system, but have other designations. For instance, the Royal School of Church Music's Voice for Life training scheme designates levels by color (White, Light Blue, Dark Blue, Red, Silver, Gold) and awards by metal (Bronze Award, Silver Award, Gold Award).

== Recognition ==
Some qualifications are recognised by regulatory bodies, such as Ofqual, whereas others are not.

Some qualifications are recognised, in the admissions process for colleges and universities, as demonstrating the musical ability of the student. The UCAS Tariff awards points for certain graded music exams.

Examination results or credits may or may not be transferable from one exam board to the other.

== Examination boards ==
Notable music examination boards include:

- ANZCA Music Examinations
- Associated Boards of the Royal Schools of Music
- Australian Guild of Music
- Australian Music Examinations Board
- London College of Music
- Music Teachers' Board
- Music Teachers National Association
- Music Teachers' Association of California
- New Zealand Music Examinations Board
- Rockschool Awards
- The Royal Conservatory of Music
- Royal Irish Academy of Music
- Royal School of Church Music
- St. Cecilia School of Music
- Trinity College London
- University of South Africa - Directorate Music
- Victoria College of Music and Drama

These examination boards offer exams in music theory as well as in musical performance.
