= Australian Guild of Music & Speech =

The Australian Guild of Music & Speech is a music examination board based in Upper Coomera, Queensland. The Guild provides graded and diploma examinations in a variety of instrumental disciplines both nationally and abroad. It was founded in 1969 following the discontinuation of examination by the London College of Music in Australia. The Guild was formerly attached to what is now known as the Australian Guild of Education, which is a tertiary education provider in North Melbourne, Victoria. They operated together as the Australian Guild of Music Education. The two institutions split in 2024.

The Guild is the publisher of Piano Odyssey, a series of pedagogical repertoire books. It is additionally a sponsor of numerous domestic pedagogical associations and conferences, such as the Queensland Music Teachers' Association.
