= Chamber Music Society of Colombo =

Sri Lankan musical group

- Formation: January 2007

The Chamber Music Society of Colombo (CMSC) was conceptualized in 1998 by a few musicians living in Sri Lanka. The Ensemble of the CMSC made its debut in January 2007 with a concert for the Sri Lankan President, Mahinda Rajapaksa.

== Artistic Director ==
The CMSC's Artistic Director Lakshman Joseph De Saram also writes music for films, and has won several awards including the International Signis Award for most outstanding original music.

== Activities ==
The 24-piece ensemble typically performs without a conductor. Its repertoire includes baroque, classical and contemporary.

The CMSC commissions new works from living composers that draw on Sri Lankan sources of inspiration. Works commissioned in this manner have led to three world premieres being performed by the ensemble: "Beyond the Horizon" by Premasiri Khemadasa, and "Paths in the Forest" and "Dawn of Kandula", both by Stephen Allen.

== Concerts ==
The Society started an "Emerging Artistes Program" in 2008, with a view to encouraging and educating gifted new artists. In March 2012, a collaboration with the Goethe Institute in Colombo began with an ongoing series entitled "Chamber Music Plus".

The 2009-2010 season was mostly dedicated to presenting concerts and workshops celebrating the significant birth and death anniversaries of Henry Purcell, George Frideric Handel, Joseph Haydn, and Felix Mendelssohn. Partnering the CMSC was the Goethe Institute – Colombo and the German Embassy in Sri Lanka. The Society frequently works with European diplomatic missions based in Colombo, including the Embassy of Norway and Rikskonsertene (Concerts Norway), to stage concerts relating to the music from those countries.

== Principal Sponsor ==
In 2013, the society signed a memorandum of understanding with Fairway Holdings, to be its Premier Sponsor for 3 years, through to the 2016 season.

== Legal Status ==
The CMSC is a non-profit limited liability company registered under Sri Lanka's Companies Act No. 7 of 2007. It has a Board of Patrons and a Council of Benefactors who offer both advisory and material support.

== See also ==
- Lakshman Joseph de Saram
- Sulara Nanayakkara
