= Financial Planning Association of Australia =

Professional organization

Financial Advice Association Australia
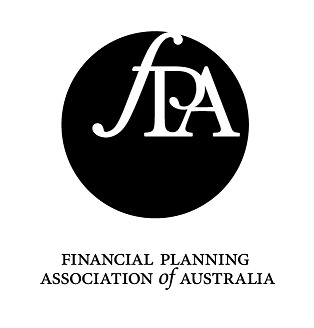
- Foundation: FUTURE2FOUNDATION

In 2023, the Financial Planning Association of Australia (FPA) merged with the Association of Financial Advisers (AFA) to form the Financial Advice Association Australia (FAAA). The association has around 11,000 members and affiliates, with over 4,000 CERTIFIED FINANCIAL PLANNER^{®},or CFP^{®} professionals. The FAAA offers different membership categories including CFP Professional, Practitioner member - AFP®, Affiliate, Retired, Academic and Student Affiliate members. In addition to running a program of local events across Australia, the FAAA also hosts an annual professionals Congress for members and non-members in the profession. The FAAA operates 30 Chapters across Australia which are supported by Chapter Chairs and Regional Chapter Chairs. Alongside its consumer-facing brand Money & Life the FAAA also runs regular campaigns to raise awareness of the value of financial advice amongst Australian consumers.

== Royal Commission & COVID-19 ==
The FPA published a media release in May 2020 responding to the deferral of Royal Commission recommendations due to COVID-19, saying that it believed the government should remain open to reviewing the timeline given the "current uncertain environment."

At the time, the FPA said whilst it broadly agreed with the draft legislation on the Royal Commission recommendations, it did have real concerns for both the profession and consumers who it is seeking to serve.

Back in 2018, an article published by Money and Life said that the FPA supports the phasing out of grandfathered commissions, provided the following five principles were met:

1. The change is in the clients’ best interest and no client will be worse off;

2. Commission payments are refunded to clients and not retained by the product provider;

3. Tax relief is provided for any adverse tax consequences;

4. Centrelink benefits are protected from any adverse consequences; and

5. Exit fees be banned in line with the Government's 2018/19 Budget proposal on both super and investment products”.

In the same article CEO of the FPA, Dante De Gori, said that the FPA's stance is after a three-year transition period the grandfathering of commissions should be subject to the FoFA (Future of Financial Advice) provisions.

== Exploring a merger ==
In 2022 it was announced that the Association of Financial Advisers (AFA) and FPA were entering into a period of member consultation to explore the potential of a merger. The boards of both associations agreed that a merger is in the best interests of the profession to create 'a united voice.' The merger will go to a member vote in 2023.

The FPA and AFA have achieved legal completion of their merger to form the FAAA. The Financial Planning Association of Australia (FPA) and the Association of Financial Advisers (AFA) have legally completed their merger to form the Financial Advice Association Australia (FAAA).'

== 2017 White Paper ==
In November 2017, the FPA published a report titled “Mapping Fintech to the Financial Planning Process: Why fintech is not a threat." 'The Fintech White Paper,' as it is commonly referred to, was introduced at the FPA Annual Professionals Congress 2017. The white paper was discussed by FinancialMappers to explore the challenges and opportunities that fintech products offer to the financial planning industry.

=== Fintech ===
The FPA's chief executive informed Money Management that fintech would assist financial planners with estimations regarding the possible costs they could incur when they offer financial assistance. The article also mentioned that fintech “would provide data to the FPA that it planned to use to help planners benchmark their business costs and efficiencies against their peers”.

==== FPA Four Pillars Policy ====
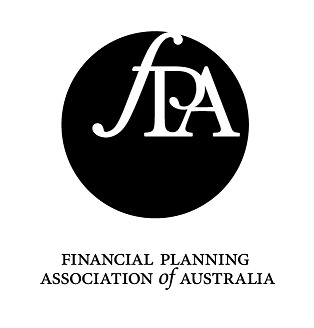
FPA logo

The FPA published a report titled “The Four Pillars Policy”. It is written in an interview style featuring the CEO of the FPA. According to the report, the key elements of the Four Pillars Policy are; 1. Public Interest, 2. Professional Practitioner, 3. Government and Regulatory and 4. Code of Professional Practice. FPA CEO, Dante De Gori, was quoted saying that The Four Policy Pillars process is a transparent framework whereby all member practitioners and key stakeholders can help shape existing and future FPA policy.

== FPA Congress 2018 ==
The FPA Congress 2018 placed attention on technology, the association also announced an app and launched the fintech buyers guide.

There were several topics discussed at the congress held in November 2018, these include:

=== Conflict of Interest of Advisers ===
A former ASIC senior investigator spoke at the congress saying that it is the advisers’ responsibility and not the institutions or the licensee’ responsibility to manage their conflicts of interest. He recommended ASIC Regulatory Guide 175 which according to him covers the "conflict priority rule”.

=== Find a Planner ===
During the Congress the FPA announced it planned to extend its Find a Planner service, promising to include personality and profiles when finding a suitable person for its members. Regarding the Find a Planner service it according to its reports “has proven very successful, with on average 6900 searches, 14,500 profile views and 40 direct messages per month.

=== CERTIFIED FINANCIAL PLANNER designation ===
The head of policy and standards at FPA mentioned that the CFP designation would be reviewed following the release of the Financial Advice Standards and Ethics Authority's proposed framework. According to an article by Professional Planner, Ben Marshan told attendees that “the initial focus for the FPA would be on producing submissions to FASEA’s consultation on the proposal and coming to an understanding of what the final standard were” before the FPA could proceed with CFP.

The FPA Congress 2018 was a three-day event from 21–23 November and was held at the International Convention Centre, in Sydney New South Wales.

== FPA Professionals Congress 2019 ==
The 2019 Financial Planning Association Congress was held on 27–29 November at the Melbourne Convention Exhibition Centre. The first speaker for the congress was announced to be Mitch Anthony who is the founder and president of Adviser Insights Inc.

== Financial Adviser Standards and Ethics Authority (FASEA) ==
The financial adviser standards and ethics authority was founded by the government of Australia after the then Financial Services Minister Kelly Dwyer revealed and informed the public of reforms intended to raise the standards required for financial advisers. The purpose of the financial adviser standards and ethics authority according to an article by Professional Planner is to be “a body that would be responsible for determining exactly what a professional adviser looks like”. Its board members were picked based on their academia, ethics and advice. In an article written by Professional Planner, the FPA released a white paper in response to the formation of FASEA, within the white paper they recommended that a 100-point system be adopted to help differentiate between degrees that are required and those that are irrelevant.

At the FPA professionals congress in November 2018, an article published by Money Management reported that the Financial Planning Association of Australia's head of policy and standards Ben Marshan announced that the association will assist FASEA when it concerns the transitional standards that they are to impose. In the article by Money Management it was also revealed that the Financial Adviser Standards and Ethics Authority chief executive Stephen Glenfield had during the professional congress mentioned that “he believed there were 150 programs provided for in the draft legislative instrument”.

== Relationship with other Associations ==
The Professional Planner published an article in December 2018, which discussed that the FPA had signed a co-operation agreement with the Association of Financial Advisers (AFA), Boutique Financial Planners (BFA), the Financial Services Institute of Australasia (FINISA), the Self-managed Superannuation Fund Association (SMSF Association) and the Stockbrokers and Financial Advisers Association (SAFAA). SAFAA chief executive was quoted in the article saying that the alliance “provides [advisers] with the lowest unit-cost solution… while giving clients the best possible protection”, and the FPA's chief executive said that “the co-operation agreement would allow the profession to gain control of the process.”

=== Life Insurance task force ===
Money Management published that the FPA and AFA (Association of Financial Advisers) confirmed their establishment of a Life Insurance task force. According to the article, the aim of this task force is to “provide a single voice to the Government on what the advice industry believes should happen when the Life Insurance Framework runs its course and is reviewed by the Australian Securities and Investments Commission in 2021”.

=== Insurance dilemma with AFCA ===
The FPA issued a warning to the AFCA (Australian Financial Complaints Authority) regarding its dealings with cases from as early as 2008. Money Management stated that “The FPA is concerned about whether professional indemnity (PI) policies put in place around 2008, will cover a potential legacy complaint…. and the FPA was also concerned about the impact of potential legacy claims on financial planners and the future PI insurance market”. The chief executive of the FPA informed the AFCA in a written submission that the professional indemnity issue required further attention by the complaints authority alongside also the professional indemnity insurance industry, this was published by the website IFA in April 2019.
