= Music Medals =

Music Medals are QCA-accredited music assessments and teaching resources offered by the Associated Board of the Royal Schools of Music and aimed at younger learners. They are available to all schools and Music Services that register as Music Medals Partners.

There are five progressive levels available - Copper, Bronze, Silver, Gold and Platinum.

Music Medals are distinct from Graded Music Exams in that there are no external examiners involved and the initial assessment is made by the teacher. All assessments are video recorded and submitted to the Associated Board of the Royal Schools of Music for moderation.

== Assessment ==
A Music Medals assessment is divided into three sections which are performed consecutively by the candidate. Each component of the assessment focuses on different aspects of the candidate's skills.

=== Components ===
- Ensemble. The candidate plays an individual line in an ensemble piece for two, three or four players. Ensemble playing provides experience of the skills of leading, interaction, listening and blending with others.
- Solo. The candidate plays one piece from the solo repertoire list for his or her instrument and Medal.
- Option. The candidate selects and undertakes one Option test from a choice of four (Call & Response, Make a Tune, Question & Answer or Sight-Reading). The tests are aimed at helping candidates develop sound musicianship skills.

Candidates are awarded one of three attainment categories - Excellent, Pass or Working Towards - depending on the quality of their performances across all three Music Medal components.

== Publications ==
The Music Medals scheme is supported by specifically commissioned ensemble repertoire and group-teaching publications.
