= Vanessa Scammell =

Australian pianist and conductor

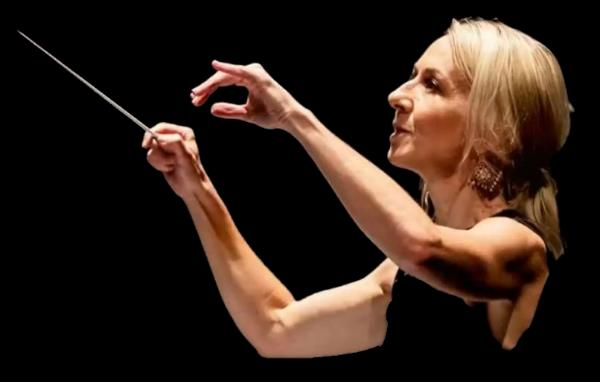
Vanessa Scammell, 2018

Vanessa Scammell is an Australian pianist and conductor in the field of ballet, musical theatre, concert, and opera.

== Career ==
After growing up in Gippsland, Victoria, where she was taught by Judy Hall, Scammell graduated in 1992 from the Melbourne Conservatorium with Bachelor of Music degree (Honours in Piano Performance) and a Bachelor of Music Education. She then continued her studies at the Sydney Conservatorium gaining a Graduate Diploma of Music – Opera Répétiteur, and worked as rehearsal pianist for the Victoria State Opera, Opera Australia, and other companies.

Scammell gained a master's degree in conducting studying under Vladimir Vais and Imre Palló. She was the musical director for the Australian 2007 tour of The Phantom of the Opera with Anthony Warlow. She has been the recipient of the Robert and Elizabeth Albert Conducting Fellowship for the Australian Ballet and in 2008 she received the Brian Stacey Conducting Award. Scammell was the music director the ABC's TV opera The Divorce, of the Helpmann Awards for 12 years, for the production of From Broadway to La Scala which toured Australia and New Zealand in 2017 and 2019 with David Hobson, Teddy Tahu Rhodes, Greta Bradman, Emma Matthews, Caroline O'Connor and others; and for the show Peter & Jack with Greta Bradman, Teddy Tahu Rhodes and The Idea of North at the 2015 Adelaide Festival, presented by Barry Humphries. In 2018 she was appointed guest conductor of the Hubei Symphony Orchestra with whom she conducted the 1958 opera Lake Honghu at the Sydney Opera House and in the Melbourne Recital Centre. Scammell has regularly conducted the Melbourne, Sydney, Queensland, Adelaide, West Australian, and Christchurch symphony orchestras.

Scammell conducted La traviata in 2011 for Opera Australia's Oz Opera touring production. For Opera Australia, Opera Queensland and the West Australian Opera, Scammell conducted Graeme Murphy's production of The Merry Widow in 2017/2018.

== Personal life ==
Scammell is the partner of actor Craig McLachlan.
