= Lakshman Joseph de Saram =

Sri Lankan composer

Lakshman Joseph de Saram is a film composer and classical musician. Born in Colombo, Sri Lanka and educated at the Royal College, Colombo, the High School of Performing Arts, Manhattan School of Music and Juilliard Pre-College in New York City, Joseph de Saram is influential in the music of South Asian art cinema, having scored many international award-winning films like 'Between Two Worlds' and 'Akasa Kusum.' His best-known score is to the 2012 film Bel Ami. Joseph de Saram is also artistic director of The Chamber Music Society of Colombo.

Joseph de Saram has been awarded with four Signis Awards for outstanding original score for a feature film, for Mille Soya in 2005, Machan in 2008, "Matha" in 2013, and "Sulanga Gini Aran" in 2018.
