= Nursing Service Cross =

Australian military nursing decoration

- Medal and ribbon
- Type: Medal (Decoration)
- Awarded for: Outstanding devotion and competency in the performance of nursing duties, or for an act of exceptional dedication in the performance of such duties
- Description: Four stepped sterling silver cross, with transparent red enamel cross insert, ensigned by Crown of Saint Edward, surmounted by a plain sterling silver suspender bar, and suspended on a gold edged white ribbon with deep red central bar
- Presented by: Australia
- Eligibility: Members of the Australian Defence Force
- Post-nominals: NSC
- Status: Active (but nominations presently closed)
- Established: 18 October 1989
- First award: 8 June 1992
- Final award: 11 June 2007

Highlights
- Total: 29
- Total recipients: 28

Order of Wear
- Next (higher): Conspicuous Service Cross (CSC)
- Next (lower): Medal for Gallantry (MG)
- Related: Royal Red Cross (RRC)

The Nursing Service Cross (NSC) is a conspicuous service decoration (Note: A decoration is an award made for valour, gallantry, bravery, distinguished or conspicuous service, and is distinct from an honour in that it is not an appointment made to an order, like the Order of Australia.) of the Australian honours and awards system, instituted by Letters Patent (Note: In Australia, Letters Patent are an official prerogative instrument of law making, made under the royal prerogative (which is that power of the Crown still existing and not superseded by parliamentary legislation), enabled by section 61 of the Australian Constitution. As the Sovereign has remained the font of "all honour and dignity" in Australia, the practice of instituting Australian honours and awards via Letters Patent continues, although in practice the role of the Sovereign is very limited, as Letters Patent are drafted by the government of the day and by convention the Sovereign is guided by the advice of that government to sign them, making the role taken by the Sovereign overwhelmingly symbolic.) on 18 October 1989.

The Nursing Service Cross is awarded to medics (enrolled nurses) and nurses (registered nurses) of the Australian Defence Force for outstanding devotion and competency in the performance of nursing duties, (Note: Nomination criteria excludes recognising immediate or short term paramedic and first aid care alone.) or for an act of exceptional dedication in the performance of such duties, in warlike or non-warlike conditions.

There have been 28 recipients, and 29 awards, since the Nursing Service Cross was instituted on 18 October 1989. Jonathan Aharon Walter is the sole awardee to have received the Nursing Service Cross more than once, first in 2004, and then again in 2007 (when he was awarded a Bar to his existing Nursing Service Cross).

The former Regimental Sergeant Major of the Army, Kim Felmingham, is also a Nursing Service Cross recipient. As of March 2010, nominations for the award of the Nursing Service Cross were suspended by determination of the Chief of Defence Force.

== Design ==
The Nursing Service Cross is a four-stepped sterling silver equidistant straight armed cross, ensigned with the Crown of Saint Edward, surmounted by a plain sterling silver suspender bar. The obverse (front of the medal) has a transparent red enamel cross insert, overlaid on a flecked pattern radiating from the centre of the cross.

Reverse of Nursing Service Cross

The reverse (rear) of the Nursing Service Cross has a horizontal panel that displays the recipient's details, superimposed on a design of fluted rays of varying lengths.

The Nursing Service Cross is suspended on a 32 mm ribbon, (Note: Formally known as the riband.) that has a central deep red band 12 mm wide, flanked by two white vertical bands 8 mm wide, and is edged in gold bands 2 mm wide. The symbolism of the colours used on the ribbon for the Nursing Service Cross is that the gold represents the colour of sand, white represents purity, and the deep red colour used (which is the colour of a native sedge flower) is a link between a natural Australian colour and the red cross.

Second and subsequent awards of the Nursing Service Cross are recognised by a sterling silver bar with a superimposed central 6mm wide red enamel cross insert, worn on the ribbon above the medal (and an 8 mm wide cross of red enamel worn centrally on the ribbon bar, and a half sized bar on the ribbon of the miniature cross).

The miniature of the Nursing Service Cross is a half-sized replica of the cross, suspended from a miniature of the ribbon that is 16 mm wide.

A lapel badge, being a 10 mm wide replica of the cross, is also provided to awardees.

== History ==
The award of medals for conspicuous conduct can be traced back to 1643 (potentially even earlier). Before 18 October 1989, eligible Australian Defence Force (ADF) members could be awarded the Royal Red Cross under the Imperial honours system. About 250 Australian nurses received one of the two classes of the Royal Red Cross between the Boer War and the Vietnam War. The last time the Royal Red Cross was awarded in Australia, (Note: The last military nurses to be awarded the Royal Red Cross in Australia were Jane Greenslade (Navy), Pegeen Mallon (Air Force), Carol Ann O’Connor (Air Force), and Pamela Joy Wright (Army) on 31 December 1981.) which had never been intended as a specific award for Australian military nurses, was on 31 December 1981.

=== Origin ===
When Australian Prime Minister Bob Hawke came to power in 1983, he declared his government would no longer be making any recommendations for Imperial honours and awards. On 26 January 1986, Hawke announced the intention to seek Letters Patent for a new military award to recognise outstanding operational and non-operational service by Australian Defence Force nurses, to be called the Australian Nursing Service Cross. On 17 July 1986, the Australian Government announced a competition to design the Nursing Service Cross. On 12 December 1986, the competition winners had their design concepts and ideas forwarded to qualified designers, sculptors and engravers for finalisation.

On 18 October 1989, the Queen of Australia, Elizabeth II, issued Letters Patent instituting the Nursing Service Cross decoration.

=== Suspension of new nominations ===
On 3 March 2010, the Nursing Service Cross (while it is still active as an award in the Australian honours and awards scheme) was closed to new nominations by determination of the Chief of Defence Force. Awards to eligible defence members for outstanding devotion or exceptional dedication to nursing duties are now considered under the Order of Australia, Distinguished Service and Conspicuous Service awards criteria, as applicable.

=== 2017 commemorative coin ===
In 2017, the Royal Australian Mint produced for News Corp Australia a 20 cent non-circulating legal tender coin and card (241,744 produced) to commemorate the Nursing Service Cross, that was available from participating newsagents in April 2017. The nickel plated copper coin had the following features:

- Reverse – A representation of the Nursing Service Cross decoration, including suspender bar and ribbon. Positioned in the centre of a wreath at the bottom of the coin face is a representation of the St Edward's Crown. The design included the number '20' and the inscription 'NURSING SERVICE CROSS'.
- Obverse – An effigy of Her Majesty Queen Elizabeth II, together with the inscriptions 'ELIZABETH II', 'AUSTRALIA' and the inscription, in numerals, of the year 2017, as well as the initials of the coin's designer Ian Rank-Broadley 'IRB'.

== List of recipients ==
There have been 28 recipients, and 29 awards, since the Nursing Service Cross was established on 18 October 1989. Jonathan Aharon Walter is the sole awardee to have received the Nursing Service Cross twice, first in 2004, and then again in 2007 (when he was awarded a Bar to his existing Nursing Service Cross).

| Rank (at time of award) | Name | Post-nominals | Service | Date awarded | Citation | Notes |
|---|---|---|---|---|---|---|
| FLTLT | Amanda Banks | NSC | RAAF | 26 January 2006 | For outstanding devotion and competency in the performance of nursing duties as the critical care Nursing Officer on Operation CATALYST within the USAF Theatre Hospital, 332nd Expeditionary Health Group, Balad, Iraq. | |
| CAPT | Anne Frances Blundell | NSC | Army | 26 January 1994 | For outstanding devotion and competency in the performance of nursing duties with the United Nations Transitional Authority in Cambodia. | |
| CAPT | Gregory Richard Brown | CSC, NSC | Army | 12 June 2006 | For outstanding devotion and competency in the performance of nursing duties as the Second-in-Command of the Army Parachute Surgical Team and Officer Commanding Holding Company of the ANZAC Field Hospital deployed in support of Operation SUMATRA ASSIST. | |
| SGT | Geoffrey Ian Cox | NSC | Army | 11 June 2007 | For an act of exceptional dedication in the performance of nursing duties as a member of the Royal Australian Army Medical Corps, Defence Co-operation Program – East Timor. | |
| FLTLT | Stephen Michael Crimston | NSC | RAAF | 17 October 2003 | For outstanding devotion to duty and tireless work in the delivery of lifesaving care to the injured, and solace to their friends and relatives as a member of the Operation BALI ASSIST Aeromedical Evacuation Team, October 2002. | |
| CPL | Daniel Troy Davidson | NSC | Army | 26 January 2007 | For acts of exceptional dedication in the performance of nursing duties as a member of Special Operations Task Unit 637.1 during Operation SLIPPER, Afghanistan 2005. | |
| SSGT | Kim Felmingham | NSC, OAM | Army | 25 March 2000 | For outstanding devotion and competency in providing medical treatment to vehicle accident casualties on 14 January 2000 while on Operation STABILISE in East Timor. | |
| SQNLDR | Ann Teresa Harrison | NSC | RAAF | 8 June 1992 | For outstanding performance of nursing duties at No 3 RAAF Hospital. | |
| CPL | Timothy John Hayden | NSC | Army | 26 January 1995 | For exceptional dedication and devotion to duty to the Australian Army, particularly following a motor vehicle accident near Paluda Camp in Malaysia on 23 September 1993. | |
| FLTLT | Anna-Lisa Hernan | NSC | RAAF | 12 June 2006 | For outstanding devotion and competency in the performance of nursing duties with the Royal Australian Air Force aeromedical evacuation team during Operation SUMATRA ASSIST. | |
| WGCDR | Margaret Joy Hine | AM, NSC | RAAF | 26 January 2003 | For outstanding achievement as the Commanding Officer of Number 6 Royal Australian Air Force Hospital, Royal Australian Air Force Williams, and as the Commanding Officer of the United Nations Military Hospital, Dili, East Timor. | |
| SQNLDR | Elizabeth Anne Howell | NSC | RAAF | 26 January 1998 | For outstanding devotion and competency in the performance of nursing duties as the Nursing Administrator at the No 3 Royal Australian Air Force Hospital, Richmond NSW. | |
| PO | Adrian Leslie Leach | NSC | RAN | 26 January 1997 | For outstanding professionalism, expertise and devotion to duty while on board HMAS SWAN. | |
| CPL | Sarah Ann Longshaw | NSC | Army | 29 October 2004 | For outstanding devotion and competency in the performance of nursing duties as the Medical Assistant on Operation CATALYST with the Australian Army Training Team in Northern Iraq. | |
| WO2 | Alastair George Mackenzie | NSC | Army | 11 June 2007 | For an act of exceptional dedication in the performance of nursing duties as a member of the Royal Australian Army Medical Corps, Defence Co-operation Program – East Timor. | |
| CAPT | Lewis Ritchie MacLeod | NSC | Army | 25 November 1996 | For outstanding devotion and competency in the performance of nursing duties as the Operating Theatre Nursing Officer while serving with the Australian Medical Support Force in Rwanda. | |
| CAPT | Jane Anne Mateer | NSC | Army | 11 June 2007 | For outstanding devotion and competency in nursing duties on Operation CATALYST at the United States Air Force Theatre Hospital, Balad, Iraq. | |
| FLTLT | Helena Mary McDonnell | NSC | RAAF | 14 June 1993 | For conspicuous nursing service to the Royal Australian Air Force at No 3 RAAF Hospital. | |
| CPL | Wayne Bradley McKenna | NSC | Army | 25 March 2000 | For outstanding devotion and competency in the performance of medical duties with the 1st Combat Service Support Team in East Timor. | |
| CPO | Neil Michael Perrin | NSC | RAN | 10 June 1996 | For outstanding devotion to duty and competency as the senior health services member in HMAS HOBART. | |
| CPL | Warren Mark Purse | NSC | Army | 13 June 1994 | For outstanding devotion and competency in the performance of nursing duties while serving as a medical assistant with the United Nations Transitional Authority in Cambodia. | |
| CPL | McQuilty Quirke | NSC | Army | 26 January 2007 | For exceptional dedication in the performance of nursing duties as the Regimental Aid Post Corporal Medic, B Squadron, the 3rd/4th Cavalry Regiment. | |
| FLGOFF | Catherine Anne Rafter | NSC | RAAF | 26 January 1996 | For outstanding devotion and competency in the performance of nursing duties with the Australian Medical Support Force, Australian Contingent, United Nations Mission Assistance in Rwanda. | |
| SQNLDR | Geoffrey Dean Robinson | NSC | RAAF | 10 June 1996 | For exceptional dedication to the RAAF in the field of nursing education | |
| CAPT | Lorna Maria Todd | NSC | Army | 26 January 1996 | For outstanding devotion and competency in the performance of nursing duties with the Australian Medical Support Force, Australian Contingent, United Nations Mission Assistance in Rwanda. | |
| SGT | Lloyd Charles Tonkin | NSC | RAAF | 14 June 1999 | For outstanding devotion and competency in the performance of nursing duties as a Senior Non-Commissioned Officer Medical Assistant at the Health Services Flight, No 304 Air Base Wing, Edinburgh | |
| PTE | Jonathan Aharon Walter | NSC | Army | 14 June 2004 | For outstanding devotion and competency in the performance of nursing duties in warlike operations as the Medical Assistant/Nurse for Delta Company, AUSBATT VIII, whilst deployed on Operation CITADEL. | |
| CPL | Jonathan Aharon Walter | NSC and Bar | Army | 26 January 2007 | For exceptional dedication in the performance of nursing duties as a member of Special Operations Task Unit 637.1 during Operation SLIPPER, Afghanistan 2005. | |
| CPL | Marcus Wilson | NSC, BM | Army | 14 June 1999 | For outstanding devotion and competency in the performance of nursing duties as the Medical Assistant for the Peace Monitoring Team Arawa during Operation BEL ISI, Bougainville. | |

== See also ==
- Australian honours and awards system
- Australian Honours Order of Wearing
- Post-nominal letters (Australia)
