= Client (business) =

Person who receives advice or services from a professional

In business, commerce, and economics, a client is a person who receives advice or services from a professional, such as a lawyer or a health care provider. Clients differ from customers in that customers are thought of as "one-time buyers" while clients can be seen as "long-term recipients", and customers buy goods as well as services.

== Etymology ==
The term client is derived from Latin clientem or clinare meaning "to incline" or "to bend", the same root as many other similar words such as climate and incline.

== By field ==
=== Health and social care ===
Clients of health care providers are generally called patients, though it is not uncommon for therapists to use the word client. In a social care context, recipients of services are often referred to as "service users".

Therapeutic relationships are subject to requirements of confidentiality, meaning that therapists are not to disclose information shared by their clients during sessions, and to those not involved in the session. However, there are a number of exceptions in which a therapist can and must "break" the confidentiality, such as when the information suggests that the client poses an immediate threat to themselves or to others.

=== Law ===
Lawyers and attorneys also have clients, although the UK's Solicitors Regulation Authority refers to those who use legal services as "customers". An important aspect of a lawyer's job is developing and managing relationships with clients or, if the lawyer works for a government agency or corporation, the client's employees. Lawyers give legal advice to their clients as part of the legal process.
