= Licentiate in Music, Australia =

The Licentiate in Music, Australia (LMusA) is a very prestigious diploma awarded by the Australian Music Examinations Board (AMEB). It is awarded to exemplary candidates in the fields of musical performance, music theory and musicianship through a recital performance or a exam (for theory subjects). It is considered a professional accreditation for music.

AMEB is the main music examination board in Australia, and its Licentiate diploma has a national success rate of around 10% of their candidates. Typically, a candidate will have already completed AMEB exams up to the Associate diploma level prior to attempting the LMusA, although there is no requirement for this. Above the LMusA is the most prestigious but extremely rare Fellowship in Music, Australia (FMusA).

Other music examination boards in Australia do have a Licentiate level diploma under other names, including Australian and New Zealand Cultural Arts (ANZCA) Music Examinations Licentiate Performer Diploma ANZCA (L.Dip.A). There are equivalent diplomas awarded by Trinity College London and the Associated Board of the Royal Schools of Music.

An LMusA practical examination is conducted by two examiners: one federal examiner who maintains consistency in the national standard, and one state examiner who is a specialist in the instrument being examined. Candidates must present a repertoire from the prescribed lists of pieces that is 35 minutes, but no more than 50 minutes in length, with a further ten minutes testing musical general knowledge of the pieces presented. Candidates receive one of three grades at diploma level: "no award", "award", or the exceptional "award with distinction" (very rarely awarded).

== Categories ==
The LMusA is awarded in these categories:

Theory

- Theory of Music in Musicology, Harmony & Counterpoint or Orchestration & Arrangement.
- Musicianship (Aural & Written Analysis component)

Keyboard

- Piano
- Organ
- Accordion
- Electronic Organ

Strings

- Violin
- Viola
- Cello
- Double Bass
- Classical Guitar
- Harp

Woodwind

- Recorder
- Flute
- Oboe
- Clarinet
- Bassoon
- Saxophone

Orchestral Brass

- Horn
- Trumpet
- Trombone
- Tuba
- Euphonium

Brass Band

- Instruments in B flat, E flat and C

Singing

- Singing
- Musical Theatre

Ensemble Performance

- Woodwind
- Brass
- Percussion
- Strings
- Mixed Ensemble
