= Associate in Music, Australia =

Diploma awarded by the Australian Music Examinations Board

The Associate in Music, Australia (AMusA) is a diploma awarded by the Australian Music Examinations Board (AMEB). It is awarded by examination to outstanding candidates in the fields of musical performance, music theory and musicianship. It is considered to be equivalent to achieving an associate undergraduate degree in Music.

Other music examination boards outside of Australia also have an Associate level diploma under other names, such as Trinity College London and the Associated Board of the Royal Schools of Music.

== Description ==
Typically, a candidate will have already completed the AMEB Grade system by passing exams up to Grade 8 with credit or higher or the Certificate of Performance with a pass or higher prior to attempting the AMusA, as recommended by AMEB. The prequiresite to be successfully awarded the associate diploma is also to have successfully completed a Grade 5 theory examination for a practical AMusA, and a Grade 5 practical examination for a theory AMusA as an additional requirement.

Above the AMusA is the Licentiate in Music, Australia (LMusA) and their highest diploma Fellowship in Music, Australia (FMusA).

An AMusA practical examination is conducted by two examiners. Candidates must present a repertoire from the prescribed lists of pieces that is 25–40 minutes in length, with a further ten minutes testing musical general knowledge of the pieces presented. Candidates receive one of three grades at diploma level: "no award", "award", and the exceptional "award with distinction". As the AMEB is considered the benchmark of music examination boards in Australia, achieving this award is seen as prestigious, and signifies a high performance standard.

== Categories ==
The AMusA is awarded in these categories:

Theory:

- Theory of Music in Musicology, Harmony & Counterpoint or Orchestration & Arrangement.
- Musicianship

Keyboard:

- Piano
- Organ
- Accordion
- Electronic Organ
- Percussion

Strings

- Violin
- Viola
- Cello
- Double Bass
- Classical Guitar
- Harp

Woodwind

- Recorder
- Flute
- Oboe
- Clarinet
- Bassoon
- Saxophone

Orchestral Brass

- Horn
- Trumpet
- Trombone
- Tuba
- Euphonium

Brass Band

- Instruments in B flat, E flat and C

Singing

- Singing
- Musical Theatre

Ensemble Performance

- Woodwind
- Brass
- Percussion
- Strings
- Mixed Ensemble

== Sources ==
2012 Manual of Syllabuses. Australian Music Examinations Board. Victoria, 2011. ISSN 0729-3569
