= Australian Music Examinations Board =

Examination board for music, speech and drama in Australia

- Abbreviation: AMEB
- Established: 1887
- Legal status: Charity
- Headquarters: Melbourne, Australia
- Owners: University of Melbourne; New South Wales Government; University of Western Australia; University of Adelaide; Queensland Government; Tasmanian Government
- Website: https://ameb.edu.au

The Australian Music Examinations Board (AMEB) is a federated, privately funded charity which provides the most extensive and recognised program of examinations for music, speech and drama in Australia.

== Purpose ==
The Board has its origins in the Melbourne Conservatorium of Music where a system of public music examinations was established in 1887. Further work culminated in the formal creation of the nationwide Australian Music Examinations Board in 1918.

The AMEB develops and delivers examinations for music, theory, speech, drama and dance.

The organisation consists of a federation of branches in Victoria, New South Wales, Queensland, Western Australia, South Australia, the Northern Territory and Tasmania. There is a national office whose board consists of a representative from each state board.

Examinations cover a large range of skill levels from a "preliminary" grade suitable for very young children through to academic degree-level diplomas, including the Associate in Music (AMusA), the Licentiate in Music (LMusA), and ultimately the Fellowship in Music (FMusA), a diploma that is often conferred on an honorary basis to musical luminaries.

== History ==
With the advent of television in Australia through the 1960s, the AMEB pioneered a series of televised lectures by composer and pianist Frank Hutchens beginning in 1963.

In 2016 the AMEB introduced its first syllabus in musical theatre.

The Board celebrated its centenary in 2018. In the same year it began operating internationally in 2018 when it reached an agreement with the Vietnam National Academy of Music. This program resulted in Australian teachers and examiners travelling to Vietnam to train staff on the AMEB teaching and assessment model.

In the 2020s the AMEB expanded its use of 'generalist' examiners to assess and grade students to more senior levels, rather than employing players of the instrument being examined. Some music teachers and professionals objected to these changes.
