= Fellowship in Music, Australia =

Australian music qualification

The Fellowship in Music, Australia (FMusA) is the highest qualification attainable by the Australian Music Examinations Board (AMEB). It is an examinable qualification, founded in 1992, although for the years 2018 and 2019 it was awarded only on an honorary basis.

The AMEB is a federated body which administers music examinations in Australia, and its Fellowship is considered a very prestigious award. To have presented for examination at this level, a candidate must have previously obtained the diploma of Licentiate in Music, Australia (LMusA) in the same subject.

== Examinable qualification ==
=== Before 2017 ===
An FMusA practical examination took the form of a public recital, and was assessed by three examiners. Candidates had to present a repertoire that was 80 minutes in length, and presentation from memory was encouraged (and required for some subjects). An interval between pieces was allowed. Candidates received one of two grades at this level: "qualified" or "not qualified".

=== After November 1, 2019 ===
As of November 1, 2019, The AMEB has announced the return of the FMusA as an examinable qualification with a new syllabus.
