= Australian Guild of Music =

Education Provider

Australian Guild of Education
- Former name: Australian Guild of Music Education
- Type: Charity
- Established: 1969; 57 years ago
- Founder: Gordon Blake
- Parent institution: London College of Music
- Students: 1,800 (2019)
- Location: 451 Glenferrie Rd, Kooyong, Melbourne, Australia
- Campus: Online International
- Website: www.guildmusic.edu.au

The Australian Guild of Education (also known formerly as the Australian Guild of Music Education) is a tertiary education provider and registered charity. It is based in Melbourne, Victoria and operates in Australia, Malaysia, Singapore and worldwide through online education.

The Guild was founded in 1969 as the Australian Guild of Music and Speech, when its parent organisation, the London College of Music Examinations ceased operating in Australia. The Australian Guild of Music and Speech is now a separate entity, operating from Queensland as an examinations board.

The Australian Guild of Education offers diploma qualifications (up to postgraduate level) and a Bachelor of Music Degree accredited internationally by the Tertiary Education Quality and Standards Agency, (TEQSA) and Vocational Certifications accredited by the Australian Skills Quality Authority.
