= College of Intensive Care Medicine =

The College of Intensive Care Medicine of Australia and New Zealand
- Abbreviation: CICM
- Formation: 2008
- Purpose: Intensive Care Medicine
- Headquarters: Melbourne, Australia
- Location: Australia
- Coordinates: 37.851°S 145°E
- Region served: Australia & New Zealand
- Official language: English
- President: Mary Pinder
- Website: https://www.cicm.org.au

The College of Intensive Care Medicine (CICM), also known by its longer and more complete name, the College of Intensive Care Medicine of Australia and New Zealand, is the medical specialty college statutorily responsible for the training and accreditation of intensive care medical specialists (called "intensivists") in Australia and New Zealand.

== History ==
The first intensive care unit (ICU) in the Australasian continent was formed in Auckland, New Zealand in 1958 at the Auckland Hospital. The first ICU in Australia was formed in 1961 in St. Vincent's Hospital in Melbourne.

Since those early beginnings, the specialty of intensive care medicine quickly grew, culminating in the formation of the Australian and New Zealand Intensive Care Society in 1975, and the subsequent negotiations in setting up formal training and accreditation of intensivists as a medical specialty. The latter efforts eventually bore fruit in 1976 with the establishment of two training pathways for intensivists administered separately by the Royal Australasian College of Physicians (RACP) and what was then-known as the Faculty of Anaesthetists of the Royal Australasian College of Surgeons (RACS) (the Faculty of Anaesthetists will eventually become the Australian and New Zealand College of Anaesthetists or ANZCA in 1992).

The National Specialist Qualification Advisory Committee formally recognised intensive care as a primary medical specialty in 1980. This recognition has been updated with the present-day Australian Medical Council.

The development of intensivist training took a further step in 2001, with the establishment of the Joint Faculty of Intensive Care Medicine (JFICM). This was an amalgamation of the RACP and ANZCA intensivist training pathways, with administration of the new Joint Faculty provided by ANZCA.

CICM came into being in 2008, after further work on creating an independent medical specialty college. The JFICM was broken off from ANZCA and received statutory recognition as a medical specialty college in its own right in 2008.
