= ABRSM =

UK music examinations board (est. 1889)

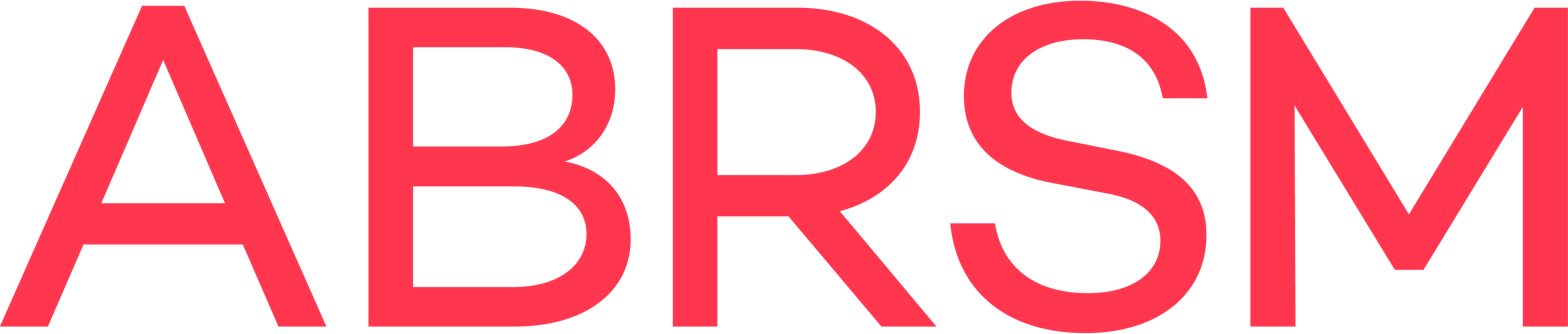
- Type: Charity
- Industry: Music education
- Founded: 1 October 1889
- Founder: Sir George Grove; Sir Alexander Mackenzie; Sir Arthur Sullivan; Sir Charles Stanford; Sir Walter Parratt; Sir Hubert Parry; Sir John Stainer
- Headquarters: 4 London Wall Place; London; EC2Y 5AU, United Kingdom
- Area served: 93 countries worldwide
- Key people: Chris Cobb (Chief Executive); Colette Bowe (Chairman); Mervyn Cousins (Chief Examiner)
- Products: Music exams Sheet music publications Digital music applications Music education courses and events
- Revenue: 23,397,000 pound sterling (2021)
- Net income: £45.5 million (2023)
- Number of employees: 182 (2023)
- Website: abrsm.org

The ABRSM (the Associated Board of the Royal Schools of Music) is an examination board and registered charity based in the UK. ABRSM is one of five examination boards accredited by Ofqual to award graded exams and diploma qualifications in music within the UK's National Qualifications Framework (along with the London College of Music, RSL Awards (Rockschool Ltd), Trinity College London, and the Music Teachers' Board). 'The Associated Board of the Royal Schools of Music' was established in 1889 and rebranded as ABRSM in 2009. The clarifying strapline "the exam board of the Royal Schools of Music" was introduced in 2012.

More than 600,000 candidates take ABRSM exams each year in over 90 countries. ABRSM also provides a publishing house for music which produces syllabus booklets, sheet music and exam papers and runs professional development courses and seminars for teachers.

ABRSM is one of the UK's 200 largest charitable organisations ranked by annual expenditure.

== History ==
The Associated Board of the Royal Schools of Music was founded in 1889 when Alexander Mackenzie, then the Principal of the Royal Academy of Music, and George Grove, founding Director of the Royal College of Music, decided that the two institutions should combine to form an associated examining board to run joint local exams. The first syllabi were published in 1890 for Piano, Organ, Violin, Cello and Harp, with Viola, Double Bass and woodwind instruments added the following year. Originally, the ABRSM had only two grades and were the equivalent of the current grades 6 and 7. Due to the demand for beginner grades, the present structure (grades 1–8) was introduced in 1933. In 1947, the Royal Manchester College of Music (merged to form the present Royal Northern College of Music) and Royal Scottish Academy of Music (now the Royal Conservatoire of Scotland) joined ABRSM. Specifically, the Royal Schools referred to in ABRSM's title are the Royal Academy of Music, the Royal College of Music, the Royal Conservatoire of Scotland and the Royal Northern College of Music.

Since the post-World War II years, the ABRSM saw an increase in overseas exam applications. The curriculum also expanded, with the addition of Guitar, Harpsichord, Voice, (with the option of both classical singing and singing for musical theatre), percussion, Recorder and all brass instruments.

The 1990s saw percussion and jazz added to the syllabus. For Diplomas, LRSM was the one that was always available. The DipABRSM and FRSM were introduced much later in the year 2000 as well as similar exams for instructors and teachers. The ARSM was introduced in the year 2016–2017 to serve as a bridge between the Grade 8 and DipABRSM exams.

In 2023 ABRSM announced major revisions to their diploma syllabuses. The DipABRSM diplomas will be withdrawn and replaced by new ARSM Diplomas in teaching and directing, alongside the ARSM performance option currently offered. Additionally, the ARSM, LRSM, and FRSM syllabuses will be revised. The DipABRSM was withdrawn due to being at the same Regulated Qualifications Framework (RQF) level as ARSM and having the same learning outcomes in essence as Ali Bowen-Davies observes.

In 2024, Now the Diploma system is in 3 levels-ARSM, LRSM and FRSM. The Prerequisites for ARSM, LRSM and FRSM Performance are Grade 8 in the instrument. For ARSM in Directing and Teaching, there are no entry requirements. For LRSM in Teaching, you need ARSM Teaching or Grade 8 in the instrument. For LRSM Directing, you need ARSM Directing or Grade 8 in the instrument or Theory. For FRSM Directing, you need LRSM Directing. For FRSM Education, you need LRSM Teaching or ARSM Performance. There are substitutions for Grade 8, but there are no substitutions when it comes to ARSM and LRSM Diplomas as entry requirements for LRSM/FRSM. For example, someone holding a ATCL/AMusA/ARCT cannot substitute ARSM Performance to enter FRSM Education.

For marks, ARSM is 34/50 for Pass, 40/50 for Merit and 45/50 for distinction. LRSM and FRSM are 50/75 for Pass, 60/75 for Merit and 68/75 for Distinction.

In Performance, ARSM candidates must present a 30 minute programme with at least 20 minutes selected from the ARSM List and up to 10 minutes of own choice repertoire of pieces at around Grade 8 standard or above. For LRSM, candidates have to play a 45 minute programme of at least 50% of repertoire from the LRSM List and up to 50% can be own choice of pieces of around ARSM Standard or above, and write a 2,000 word essay for Performance in Context having four topics to choose from. For FRSM, candidates must present a 55 minute recital which at least 50% of repertoire must be from the FRSM List and up to 50% can be own choice repertoire of pieces around LRSM Standard or above. You also must write a 3,500 word essay on Research and Reflection having four topics to choose from. You do not have to pass each section to pass the overall diploma.

== Music Medals ==
Music Medals are QCA–accredited music assessments and teaching resources aimed at younger, group-taught learners. Music Medals are distinct from graded music exams in that no external examiners are involved and the initial assessment is made by the teacher.

== Qualifications ==
Ofqual is the regulator for ABRSM's qualifications of Grades and the Diplomas. The Qualifications sit on the RQF Levels Framework and make people understand the equivalent level of each qualification of ABRSM and the difficulty. The TQT and credits indicates the Size of the Qualification and tell people how long a typical learner would take to complete the qualification. For TQT you just have to multiply the credits by 10. For example in Grade 8 Performance/Practical Grades the TQT is 32 times 10= 320 hours.

RQF Level	ABRSM Qualification	Equivalent Qualification/Level	Credits for Practical Performance Grades and Performance Diplomas	Credits for Theory Grades and Teaching/Directing Diplomas
8		Doctoral Degree/PhD		
7	FRSM	Masters Degree/PostGraduate Level	225	240
6	LRSM	Bachelors Degree	180	200
5		Higher National Diploma, Diploma of Higher Education, Foundation Degrees, 2nd Year of Bachelors Degree		
4	ARSM/OLD DipABRSM	Certificate of Higher Education, Higher National Certificate, 1st Year of Bachelors Degree	90	100
3	Grade 6-8	As Level/A Level/IB Diploma	22-Grade 6, 27-Grade 7-Grade 8-32	13-Grade 6, 17-Grade 7, 21-Grade 8
2	Grade 4-5	IGCSE Grade A* to C	15-Grade 4, 18-Grade 5	7-Grade 4, 9-Grade 5
1	Grade 1-3	IGCSE Grade D to G	6-Grade 1, 9-Grade 2, 12-Grade 3	2-Grade 1, 3-Grade 2, 5-Grade 3
Entry	Initial Grade		4	

== Publications ==
ABRSM published its first books in 1918 and its publishing department was first set up in 1921 and was designed to provide suitable music for examinations, performance editions of popular works and new instructional compositions. One of the original editors was Sir Donald Tovey, who wrote informative notes on the music which are still highly regarded today. ABRSM (Publishing) Ltd. was established as a separate company in 1985.

== Audio logo ==
In November 2025, ABRSM introduced an official audio logo as part of its visual and sonic brand identity. The five-note motif was derived from the winning entry in an international Audio Logo Competition, which invited members of the public to submit original musical ideas. The winning motif, composed by Dennis Cheng of the United States, was orchestrated by composer Christopher Hussey and recorded by the Prague Metropolitan Orchestra under the direction of Alastair King at Smečky Music Studios. The audio logo is used across ABRSM's digital platforms and audiovisual content.

== Digital resources ==
Since 2009 ABRSM has produced several practice applications to support teachers and students:

- Melody Writer – a tool designed to help improve melody writing and music theory knowledge and understanding
- Aural Trainer – an iPhone app that helps students practice their aural skills
- Speedshifter – a practice tool that allows students to vary the speed of audio without altering the pitch
- Piano Practice Partner – an app for iOS and Android devices that helps students practice exam pieces for piano at Grades 1 to 3. Piano Practice Partner plays one hand so that students can play the other as they learn.
