= Tim McOwan =

Australian Army officer

Timothy Joseph McOwan
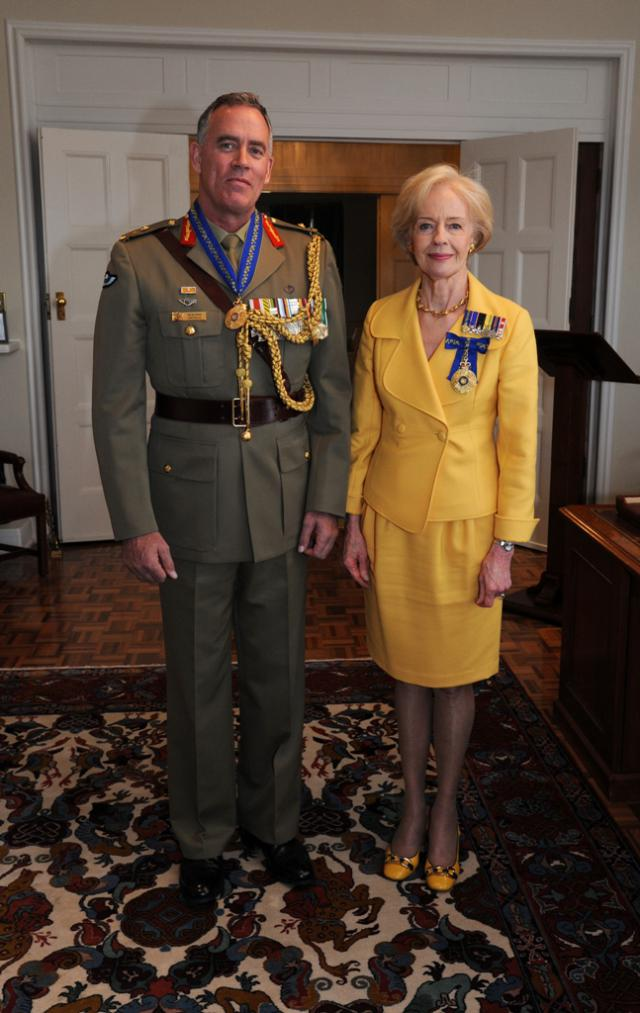
- Governor-General Quentin Bryce presents McOwan with the Officer of the Order of Australia in 2013
- Born: Ararat, Victoria
- Military career
- Allegiance: Australia
- Branch: Australian Army
- Service years: 1976–2014
- Rank: Major general
- Commands: Special Operations Command Australia (2008–11); Special Air Service Regiment (1999–01)
- Conflicts: Operation Mazurka; Operation Pollard; Operation Gold; International Force East Timor; War in Afghanistan; Iraq War
- Awards: Officer of the Order of Australia; Distinguished Service Cross; Conspicuous Service Medal; Army Commendation Medal (United States)

Major General Timothy Joseph McOwan, AO, DSC, CSM is a retired senior officer of the Australian Army. He served as Special Operations Commander Australia from February 2008 until January 2011, and the Australian Defence Attaché and Head Australian Defence Staff in Washington, D.C. He retired from the army in 2014.

== Military career ==
McOwan enlisted in the Australian Army in 1976, and gained his commission via the Royal Military College, Duntroon in 1980.

McOwan served in regimental appointments with the 1st Battalion, Royal Australian Regiment (1RAR) and the Special Air Service Regiment (SASR). His service with 1RAR included an attachment to the Rifle Company Butterworth, in Malaysia while his service with the SAS included a two-year secondment to the headquarters commanding the British Special Air Service and the Special Boat Service.

Whilst in SASR he served as a vehicle mounted troop commander, a counter terrorist troop commander, an operations officer and adjutant. He also commanded SAS Operations Support Squadron, between 1990 and 1991. In 1992 McOwan attended the Army Command and Staff College at Fort Queenscliff, following which he served in staff appointments within the Directorate of Operational Support in Army Headquarters.

In 1994 he was then appointed as Commander Australian Service Contingent Operation Mazurka, with the Multinational Force and Observers, Sinai, Egypt where he served as the force assistant chief of staff.

In 1998 McOwan attended the Joint Services Command and Staff College in the United Kingdom, before being deployed to the Persian Gulf on Operation Pollard as a member of the United States Central Command-led Coalition Headquarters.

McOwan assumed command of the SASR in 1999, holding that position until 2001. During his time as commanding officer, McOwan commanded Joint Task Force 504 during Operation Spitfire, the Special Operations Component of International Force for East Timor during Operation Warden, and Joint Task Force 643 during Operation Gold, the ADF Counter Terrorism support to the Sydney Olympics. For the former deployment, McOwan was awarded the Distinguished Service Cross, while 3 Squadron SASR was granted the Meritorious Unit Citation.

During 2001 McOwan was appointed the chief staff officer plans in Joint Operations Command. In this capacity he was responsible for operational planning for Australia’s commitment to the war on terror, Operation Slipper in Afghanistan and Operation Falconer in Iraq, as well as numerous other ADF operations.

In 2004 he became the director strategy and international engagement in Army Headquarters, before assuming the appointment of deputy special operations commander, Australia.

In January 2006 he was appointed the chief of defence force liaison officer to the Chairman of the Joint Chiefs of Staff in The Pentagon, Washington, D.C. This appointment saw him responsible to the Chief of the Defence Force for liaison between the US Defence Force and the Australian Defence Force in the areas of operations, strategic plans and intelligence.

McOwan assumed the appointment of Special Operations Commander Australia in February 2008; he relinquished this post in January 2011. He then served as Australian Defence attaché and head Australian Defence Staff in Washington, D.C. In the 2012 Australia Day Honours, McOwan was appointed an Officer of the Order of Australia in recognition of his "substantial contribution to the capabilities, operational successes and international reputation of Australia’s Special Forces".

McOwan retired from the army in 2014. In March 2015 he was appointed a member of the Northern Territory Government's Strategic Defence Advisory Board, which provides advice on business opportunities related to the defence industry.

== Personal ==
McOwan's academic achievements include a Bachelor of Arts (military studies), a graduate diploma in management, a graduate diploma in defence studies, a Masters in Business Administration and a Master of Arts in strategic studies.

McOwan is married, and has two children.

Military offices
Preceded by Major General Mike Hindmarsh	Special Operations Commander; 2008–2011	Succeeded by Major General Gus Gilmore
