= Special Air Service Regiment =

Special forces unit of the Australian Army

- Cap badge of the Special Air Service Regiment
- Active: 25 July 1957 (as 1st SAS Coy); 20 August 1964 – present (as SASR)
- Country: Australia
- Branch: Australian Army
- Type: Special forces
- Role: Special operations; Counter-terrorism
- Size: One regiment
- Part of: Special Forces Group
- Garrison/HQ: Campbell Barracks, Swanbourne, Western Australia
- Nicknames: "Chicken stranglers"; "Snake eaters"
- Motto: Who Dares Wins
- March: Quick – The Happy Wanderer; Slow – Lili Marlene
- Engagements: Indonesian Confrontation; Vietnam War; Somali Civil War; 1999 East Timorese crisis; Afghanistan; 2003 invasion of Iraq; Military intervention against ISIL; 2006 East Timorese crisis
- Decorations: Unit Citation for Gallantry; Meritorious Unit Citation; Presidential Unit Citation

Commanders
- Notable commanders: Michael Jeffery (1976–77); Jim Wallace (1988–90); Duncan Lewis (1990–91); Mike Hindmarsh (1997–99); Tim McOwan (1999–2001); Gus Gilmore (2001–02); Rick Burr (2003–04)

Insignia
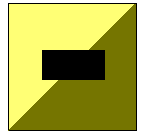
- Unit colour patch
- Abbreviation: SASR

The Special Air Service Regiment, officially abbreviated SASR and commonly known as the SAS, is a special forces unit of the Australian Army. Formed in 1957 as a company, it was modelled on the British SAS with which it shares the motto "Who Dares Wins". Expanded to a regiment in August 1964, it is based at Campbell Barracks, in Swanbourne, a suburb of Perth, Western Australia, and is a direct command unit of the Special Operations Command.

The regiment first saw active service in Borneo in 1965 and 1966 during the Indonesian Confrontation, mainly conducting reconnaissance patrols, including secret cross-border operations into Indonesian territory. The regiment's three squadrons were rotated through Vietnam, carrying out tasks included medium-range reconnaissance patrols, observation of enemy troop movements, and long-range offensive operations and ambushing in enemy dominated territory. They also served with US Army Special Forces, and conducted training missions. The SASR squadrons were highly successful, and were known to the Viet Cong as Ma Rung or "phantoms of the jungle" due to their stealth.

Following the Sydney Hilton bombing of February 1978, the regiment became responsible for developing a military counter-terrorism response force in August 1979, known as the Tactical Assault Group (TAG). SASR troops have also served in Somalia, East Timor, Iraq and Afghanistan, as well as many other peacekeeping missions. The SASR also provides a counter-terrorist capability, and has been involved in a number of domestic security operations. It has been alleged that some SASR personnel committed war crimes in Afghanistan.

== Role ==
=== Tasks and capabilities ===
A direct command unit of Special Operations Command, the SASR "is tasked to provide special-operations capabilities in support of the Australian Defence Force. This includes providing unique capabilities to support sensitive strategic operations, special recovery operations, training assistance, special reconnaissance, precision strike and direct action". The regiment is the Command's Special Missions Unit and the capability lead for special reconnaissance. The regiment is primarily structured to conduct covert, long range reconnaissance and surveillance in small teams in enemy-controlled territory. In addition to war-fighting in conventional conflicts, the SASR has also long maintained a specialist counter-terrorist capability. The regiment is also trained in counter-insurgency operations. Other capabilities include training local or indigenous forces, recovery of Australian citizens and humanitarian assistance.

=== Warfighting and special reconnaissance ===
In the long-range reconnaissance role, the SASR typically operates in small patrols of between five and six operators with the task of infiltrating enemy-held territory and providing intelligence on enemy activities and capabilities. During such tasks the SASR seeks to evade rather than confront the enemy. SASR soldiers also direct fire support including air strikes to destroy enemy installations and disrupt or kill enemy forces whenever possible. SASR reconnaissance patrols can be inserted by air (either by helicopter, parachute or high altitude parachute), land (on foot or by vehicle) or water (including by submarine, small boats, kayaks or diving) and have proved capable of covering long distances and staying concealed in jungle, desert and mountain terrain. SASR patrols may also conduct sabotage and short-duration raids on high-value targets, including headquarters, airfields and communications nodes.

=== Counter-terrorism and hostage rescue ===
One of the primary roles of the regiment is to provide a counter-terrorist capability, with an element of the SASR designated as the Tactical Assault Group (West) to respond to domestic incidents on the west coast of Australia and also for international operations. TAG (West) maintains a short-notice capability to conduct military operations beyond the scope of state/territory and federal Police Tactical Groups. Offensive counter-terrorist operations may include direct action and hostage recovery.

A capability to board ships at anchor, ships underway and off-shore gas and oil platforms is also maintained. TAG (West) is kept at high readiness for a period of 12 months, before being replaced by another squadron in this role. The 2nd Commando Regiment provides Tactical Assault Group (East) to respond to domestic incidents on the east coast of Australia.

== History ==
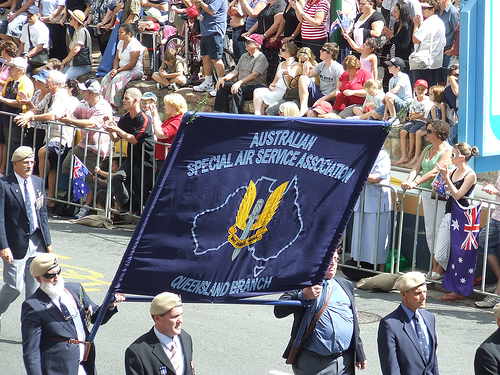
Members of the Queensland branch of the Australian Special Air Service association during the 2007 ANZAC Day march in Brisbane

=== Early years ===
The SASR draws on the experiences of Z Special Unit, M Special Unit, the Independent Companies and the Coastwatchers which operated in the South West Pacific Area against the Japanese during World War II. These units had been disbanded soon after the war as part of the demobilisation of the Australian military; however, after observing the operations of the British Special Air Service during the Malayan Emergency in the 1950s the Australian Army decided to raise its own SAS unit. The 1st Special Air Service Company was established on 25 July 1957 at Swanbourne, a suburb of Perth, Western Australia, with a strength of 16 officers and 144 other ranks.

In 1960, the company became part of the Royal Australian Regiment (RAR) and was given the responsibility for commando and special forces operations. As part of the pentropic organisation adopted by the Australian Army at the time, the regiment's primary wartime role was divisional-level reconnaissance. On 20 August 1964, the SAS gained regimental status and was expanded to two sabre squadrons and a headquarters, severing the link with the RAR. The raising of a third squadron was approved on 30 April 1965 as part of an overall expansion of the Australian Army.

=== Borneo ===
The SASR first saw action in 1965 as part of the British Commonwealth force stationed in North Borneo during the Indonesia–Malaysia confrontation. The SASR troopers operated alongside their British and New Zealand counterparts in operations aimed at stopping Indonesian infiltration into Malaysia, taking part in Operation Claret. 1 Squadron conducted reconnaissance patrols in Sarawak from February to July 1965, and cross-border operations between May and July. They suffered their first fatality on 2 June when a soldier was gored by an elephant. 1 Squadron completed operations on 1 August and returned to Australia.

2 Squadron arrived in Borneo in January 1966 for a four-month deployment, and despite the suspension of Claret operations it also conducted reconnaissance patrols and cross-border operations, undertaking a total of 45 patrols on both sides of the border. On 19 March two soldiers drowned during a river crossing. On 21 July, 2 Squadron was relieved by a British SAS squadron and returned to Australia in August. Despite often being deployed in the reconnaissance role, the SASR killed at least 20 Indonesian soldiers in a series of ambushes and contacts. Three SASR soldiers were killed. These operations mostly occurred in secret, and were never admitted during the war.

=== Vietnam ===
An SASR patrol during Operation Coburg, South Vietnam 1968.

Based in Nui Dat, the SASR was responsible for providing intelligence to both the 1st Australian Task Force (1 ATF) and US forces, operating throughout Phuoc Tuy Province as well as Bien Hoa, Long Khanh and Binh Tuy provinces. From 1966 SASR squadrons rotated through Vietnam on year-long deployments, with each of the three Sabre Squadrons completing two tours before the last squadron was withdrawn in 1971. Missions included medium range reconnaissance patrols, observation of enemy troop movements, and long range offensive operations and ambushing in enemy dominated territory.

Operating in small groups of four to six men they moved more slowly than conventional infantry through jungle or bushland and were heavily armed, employing a high rate of fire to simulate a larger force on contact and to support their withdrawal. The primary method of deployment was by helicopter, with the SASR working closely with No. 9 Squadron RAAF which regularly provided rapid and precise insertion and extraction of patrols into jungle landing zones at tree top height. On occasion, SASR patrols were also deployed by M-113 armored personnel carriers (APCs) with a method devised to deceive the Viet Cong as to their insertion and the location of their drop-off point despite the noise they made moving through the jungle. An operational parachute jump was also undertaken. (Note: 3 Squadron made an operational parachute jump 5 kilometres (3.1 mi) north west of Xuyen Moc on 15–16 December 1969, codenamed Operation Stirling.)

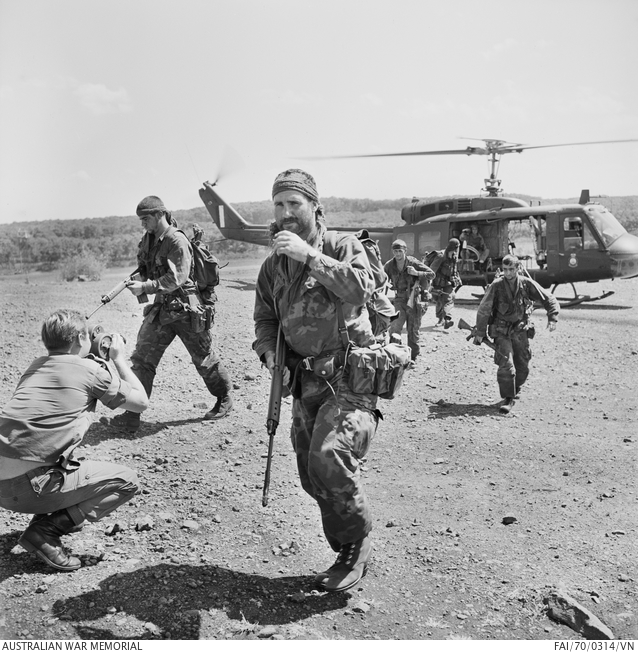
SASR soldiers returning to the main Australian base at Nui Dat after a patrol in May 1970

A fourth squadron was raised in mid-1966, but was later disbanded in April 1967. The SASR operated closely with the New Zealand SAS, with a troop being attached to each Australian squadron from late 1968. Completing its final tour in October 1971, 2 Squadron was disbanded on return to Australia, with Training Squadron raised in its place. During its time in Vietnam the SASR proved highly successful, with members of the regiment known to the Viet Cong as Ma Rung or "phantoms of the jungle" due to their stealth.

In a six-year period the Australian and New Zealand SAS in Vietnam conducted nearly 1,200 patrols and inflicted heavy casualties on the Viet Cong, including 492 killed, 106 possibly killed, 47 wounded, 10 possibly wounded and 11 prisoners captured. Their own losses totalled one killed in action, one died of wounds, three accidentally killed, one missing and one death from illness. Twenty-eight men were wounded. During the period of its deployment 580 men served in the SASR in Vietnam. The remains of the last Australian soldier who went missing in action in 1969 after falling into the jungle during a suspended rope extraction were found in August 2008. Australian SASR personnel also worked with US Army Special Forces in Vietnam, and provided instructors to the MACV Recondo School, and then to the LRRP Training Wing at the AATTV-operated Van Kiep Training Centre from 1967.

=== Defence of Australia and counter-terrorism ===
The Australian withdrawal from Vietnam brought to an end the doctrine of 'forward defence' through involvement in Southeast Asian wars. Instead, the Australian military's new focus was on the defence of continental Australia against external attack. In line with this change, the SASR took the lead in developing the Australian Army's capability to conduct patrol operations in Northern Australia. It was later recognised that this role required dedicated units with the Army forming three Regional Force Surveillance Units in the early 1980s trained by the SASR.

In July 1977 two SASR patrols were deployed to north Irian Jaya with the approval of Indonesian authorities to provide first aid to the survivors of an RAAF Iroquois helicopter which had crashed in the remote jungle during survey operations, and to secure the wreckage from possibly being captured by members of the OPM independence movement. During this time the SASR also continued to train overseas with other special forces units. On one such exercise in the Philippines, a US special forces C-130 Hercules crashed into the South China Sea shortly after take-off from Subic Bay on 26 February 1981, killing 23 passengers including three Australians from the SASR, as well as a number of Americans, Filipinos, and New Zealanders.

Meanwhile, following the Sydney Hilton bombing in February 1978, the SASR was assigned the responsibility of developing a military counter-terrorism response force in August 1979 with the unit to be designated as the Tactical Assault Group (TAG). In July 1980 the TAG was also tasked with developing a maritime capability with an emphasis on offshore oil and gas rigs. Navy divers from the Clearance Diving Branch were tasked with assisting the TAG to develop the capability as the regiment did not have sufficient divers in the water troops at the time. There was initial animosity the first year between badged troopers and the clearance divers who after having completed five months of training had only five out of eighteen applicants selected.

In 1981, the divers completed a modified SASR selection course. Towards the end of 1981, 2 Squadron was re-raised due to war roles being impacted as a consequence of the large commitment by the regiment to establishing the TAG. In 1987, 1 Squadron who had been tasked with establishing the TAG was rotated with the now full strength 2 Squadron. In 1995, Navy clearance divers stopped supporting the TAG with many divers having passed the full SASR selection over the years.

In May 1987 a squadron from the SASR was alerted for a possible deployment to Fiji as part of Operation Morris Dance, but did not leave Australia. The regiment was not involved in operations during the Gulf War in 1991 although two troops were again placed on standby for deployment at short notice, while other elements remained on high alert to respond to a terrorist incident in Australia if required.

=== Peacekeeping ===
The first SASR units to deploy on active service after the Vietnam War did so as part of Australian peacekeeping deployments. Small numbers of SASR personnel were involved in Operation Habitat in Turkey and Northern Iraq as medics to assist Kurdish refugees between May and June 1991. Personnel were also provided by the regiment as part of the Australian contribution to the UN Special Commission established to oversee the destruction of Iraq's weapons of mass destruction between 1991 and 2000. SASR medics deployed with some of the weapons inspection teams, and at times were also employed as drivers and for "personal protection" tasks.

Several SASR signallers from 152 Signal Squadron also deployed to the Western Sahara between September 1991 and May 1994 as part of the Australian contingent there. Contrary to some reports, the SASR did not provide a security team for service in Cambodia although some SASR-qualified signals sergeants from 152 Signal Squadron were deployed as part of the Australian military contribution to the United Nations Advance Mission in Cambodia (UNAMIC) and Force Communications Unit between 1991 and 1993. A small number of members of the regiment served on exchange with the British SAS and Special Boat Service (SBS) in Bosnia in the early 1990s, including a sergeant who commanded an SBS detachment in April 1993.

In April 1994, a 10-man SASR team from J Troop was attached to Australian forces in Somalia to provide an elite response, VIP protection and force protection to the Australian Service Contingent in Mogadishu. Known as "the Gerbils", the small team operated from Toyota Landcruisers and Datsun utility vehicles and two M-113 APCs. They were subsequently involved in a number of actions, including an incident on 21 May when they were flown to the scene of a downed Canadian civilian helicopter 20 kilometres (12 mi) north of Mogadishu to protect the crew. On 16 August they were involved in a skirmish during a convoy which resulted in two Somalis being killed after one of them aimed an AK-47 at the Australians. They returned to Australia in November 1994.

In August 1994 SASR-qualified medical personnel were deployed as part of the contribution to the United Nations Assistance Mission for Rwanda, some of whom were present during the Kibeho Massacre in April 1995, for which one SASR soldier and two other Australians were awarded the Medal for Gallantry for their actions. In addition, individual members of the SASR have been attached to a wide range of Australian peacekeeping deployments as observers, including in Kashmir, Lebanon and in the Sinai.

=== Black Hawk accident ===
Deaths during training accidents make up the majority of the SASR's fatalities. The worst accident in the regiment's history occurred on the evening of 12 June 1996 when two S-70-A9 Black Hawk helicopters from the 5th Aviation Regiment carrying SASR troopers collided during a live-fire counter-terrorism/special-recovery operation exercise at Fire Support Base Barbara in the High Range Training Area near Townsville, Queensland. This activity was part of Exercise Day Rotor 96 and took place on the second day of the exercise, sometime after 18:30, requiring the pilots to use night vision goggles.

Six aircraft had been approaching the target area when, 30 seconds from the landing zone, one of the helicopters veered to the right, clipping the tail rotor of another helicopter. One Black Hawk crashed immediately killing 12 personnel on board, while the other was able to make a crash landing but burst into flames, killing six. Crash survivors, soldiers from the other helicopters and exercise staff risked the flames and exploding ammunition to rescue their comrades and retrieve the bodies of the dead. Fifteen members of the SASR and three from the 5th Aviation Regiment died in the accident. Fourteen personnel were later officially recognised for their part in the rescue and evacuation operation.

=== Cambodia and Bougainville ===
In July 1997 an eight-man SASR team deployed at short notice to Butterworth in Malaysia to provide close protection and communications to the Australian ambassador and embassy staff in Cambodia if required, in preparation for the evacuation of Australian nationals in the wake of civil unrest which occurred following a coup in that country. The evacuation operation was subsequently completed successfully, with RAAF C-130s supported by Airfield Defence Guards and other military personnel evacuating 455 Australians and other nationals from Cambodia as part of Operation Vista.

Following the agreement of a truce in October 1997 which ended the conflict in Bougainville, Australian personnel were deployed as part of the New Zealand-led Truce Monitoring Group, with an SASR officer being included in the reconnaissance party and later serving on its headquarters. In April 1998, Australia took over leadership of the mission, which was renamed the Peace Monitoring Group. Numerous SASR personnel served in Bougainville over a four-year period as part of Operation Bel Isi, both in headquarters positions and as part of the monitoring teams.

=== Kuwait ===
In 1998, the SASR made its first squadron-strength deployment since Vietnam when 1 Squadron, with an attached New Zealand SAS troop, was deployed to Kuwait in February as part of the American-led Operation Desert Thunder. The force, known as Anzac Special Operations Force (ANZAC SOF), was fully integrated, with the New Zealanders providing the squadron's third troop. While the crisis was resolved peacefully, if military action had been taken the SASR would have been used in the combat search and rescue (CSAR) role to recover aircrew shot down by Iraqi air defences. The force returned to Australia in June 1998. Regardless, the operation represented the first time that SASR tactical headquarters had been deployed outside of Australia.

=== East Timor ===
The SASR played a key role in the Australian-led international peacekeeping force (INTERFET) in East Timor between September 1999 and February 2000. In the days prior to the commencement of INTERFET, the SASR was involved in the RAAF evacuation of United Nations Mission in East Timor (UNAMET) staff, Australians and refugees from East Timor following increasing violence by Indonesian military-backed militia after the East Timorese voted for independence from Indonesia. (Note: The SASR was reported to have subsequently been involved in intelligence gathering tasks prior to the landings according to some sources; however, others have stated that there was no special forces involvement in the covert intelligence gathering undertaken during this period.) The SASR subsequently provided the initial INTERFET forces to secure the point of entry at the airport and seaport in Dili. 3 Squadron, along with Allied Special Forces elements from the NZ SAS and British SBS, formed INTERFET's special forces element, known as Response Force (RESPFOR).

The SASR spearheaded most operations conducted by the international force during the early days of the intervention in East Timor and, as in Vietnam, served as the eyes and ears of the force, patrolling extensively through militia-controlled areas in vehicles and on foot as INTERFET expanded to take control of the rest of East Timor. It was involved in a number of significant contacts with pro-Indonesian militia, including at Suai on 6 October 1999 during which two SASR soldiers were wounded, and later at Aidabasalala on 16 October 1999. On 22 October 1999, the SASR conducted a combined air insertion in Black Hawk helicopters and an amphibious landing from a Navy landing craft with vehicles into the Oecusse Enclave to secure the beachhead ahead of an amphibious assault by the main force, after a clandestine reconnaissance and survey of the amphibious landing site the previous night by Navy Clearance divers from HMAS Success.

It was reported that the SASR also conducted covert patrols in the Enclave before the landings. Other tasks included VIP protection and other special forces tasks as required by the task force commander. 3 Squadron was later awarded a Meritorious Unit Citation on 25 March 2000. 1 Squadron replaced 3 Squadron in December 1999, and completed its tour in February 2000.

It has been alleged that a member of the SASR killed a prisoner taken after a SASR and New Zealand SAS Response Force counterattack at Suai on 6 October 1999 after the militia earlier ambushed the SASR. After a lengthy investigation the SASR soldier was charged with mistreating two corpses of militia killed in the engagement, but the case collapsed after the New Zealand SAS soldiers who had reported the incident were not granted anonymity by an Australian Defence Force magistrate. The ABC has reported that the New Zealand Army was concerned about the safety of its soldiers. The Australian soldier received an apology from the Chief of Army for how long the investigation into him had taken.

=== Domestic security and controversy ===
The regiment formed a key element of the security force in place for the Sydney Olympic Games in 2000, and in the lead-up to the event the regiment underwent a period of modernisation, acquiring new equipment and capabilities, including the ability to respond to chemical, biological and radiological threats, as well as developing techniques for the clandestine boarding of moving ships at night. During the Games two SASR squadrons were available for counter-terrorist operations, with one designated to respond to incidents in Sydney and Canberra, while the other was on standby for incidents elsewhere. Defence involvement in domestic security increased after the terrorist attacks in the United States on 11 September 2001, and the unit has since formed part of the security force for a range of international sporting and political events held in Australia, including the Commonwealth Heads of Government Meeting at Coolum, Queensland in March 2002, and the visit of US President George W. Bush to Canberra in October 2003. The SASR maintains TAG (West) to respond to incidents on the west coast of Australia. It also provided the training and use of their facilities to raise a second Tactical Assault Group in the 2nd Commando Regiment.

On 12 April 2001, an SASR troop conducted a boarding of the fishing vessel South Tomi using two rigid-hull inflatable boats launched from the South African Navy vessel SAS Protea in international waters 260 nautical miles (480 km; 300 mi) south of Cape Agulhas, South Africa. On 29 March, the Togo registered South Tomi fled the AFMA fisheries patrol vessel Southern Supporter after being detected poaching Patagonian toothfish near Heard Island and McDonald Islands in the Southern Ocean. The South Tomi fled towards Africa with the South African government agreeing to a request to provide a South African Navy vessel for an intercept. The SASR troop was flown on a commercial flight to South Africa. South Tomi was boarded after a pursuit of 6,100-kilometre (3,800 mi) by the Southern Supporter.

In August 2001, the SASR was involved in the Tampa affair when its counter-terrorist squadron was ordered to Christmas Island and to board the MV Tampa once it illegally entered Australian waters. While the members of the SASR involved did what they could to improve conditions on the Tampa, the use of an elite military unit to prevent asylum seekers landing in Australia was not supported by all members of the regiment and remains controversial. Less controversial was the SASR's involvement in the boarding of a North Korean freighter, the MV Pong Su—which was suspected of drug smuggling—off Newcastle on 20 April 2003 . (Note: Commanded by CO 4 RAR (Cdo), the operation involved members of TAG (West), TAG (East) and the Incident Response Regiment.)

=== Afghanistan ===
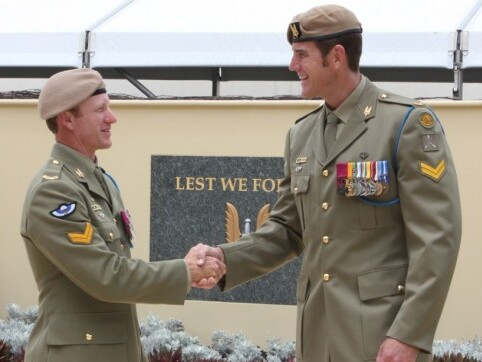
The two SASR recipients of the Victoria Cross for Australia for actions in Afghanistan, Mark Donaldson and Ben Roberts-Smith, in 2011

In October 2001, the Australian government announced that it was sending a special forces task group built around an SASR squadron to participate in the campaign against al-Qaeda and the Taliban in Afghanistan designated Operation Slipper. After staging through Kuwait, 1 Squadron arrived in Afghanistan in December 2001 with the other SASR squadrons rotating in at approximately six-monthly intervals. The SASR's main role in Afghanistan was to conduct reconnaissance and surveillance of al-Qaeda and Taliban positions, activities and capabilities. SASR force elements also conducted some offensive operations. After arriving at FOB Rhino, the SASR initially operated in southern Afghanistan with US Marines from Task Force 58, conducting long-range vehicle mounted patrols over several hundred kilometres around Kandahar and into the Helmand Valley near the Iranian-border. On 16 February 2002 Sergeant Andrew Russell was killed when the Long Range Patrol Vehicle (LRPV) he was travelling in hit a land mine during an operation in the Helmand Valley. Two other soldiers were wounded in the incident. Later the SASR operated under command of Task Force 64.

The SASR then moved to eastern Afghanistan where it played a key role in Operation Anaconda in March 2002. During the operation SASR teams were to provide on-location, in-depth operational intelligence and reconnaissance after they infiltrated the Shahi-Kot Valley ten days prior to the operation, and also saved the lives of 24 soldiers of the US 75th Ranger Regiment after their helicopter was shot down, by providing sniper overwatch and guiding in precise air strikes to end the enemy advance as they attempted to overrun the isolated Americans. Up to 300 al Qaeda fighters were later estimated to have been killed as a result of the airstrikes they called-in. Two SASR advisory and liaison officers were attached with the US 10th Mountain Division to help plan the division's air assault operations, and were subsequently involved in heavy fighting after the unit they were with became pinned down and took a number of casualties. Supported by heavy close air support they were evacuated by helicopter that evening.

Four days into the operation, SASR elements identified a potential escape route for the al-Qaeda leadership. Other coalition special forces had attempted to establish observation posts, but had quickly been discovered by shepherds or villagers. The Australians inserted a patrol undetected to monitor the escape route. From more than 1,200 metres (1,300 yd) high on a mountain, the patrol spotted a group of al-Qaeda figures dressed in Russian camouflage and wearing black balaclavas. They carried more advanced weapons than normal insurgents, and appeared to be guarding a white-robed older man with a cane as they fled the battlefield. US intelligence at first believed it was Osama bin Laden but later revised the identification to his second-in-command, Ayman al-Zawahiri. An airstrike was called in; however, there was later doubt about whether it was successful. Australian forces later uncovered a number of arms caches and destroyed an anti-aircraft piece, while other elements were tasked with screening possible escape routes to the south and killed a number of fighters as they attempted to withdraw. The initial task group was replaced by another squadron in March and April 2002, while a third squadron rotated into Afghanistan in August 2002. The SASR withdrew from Afghanistan in November 2002 after all three sabre squadrons had served in the country.

A Special Forces Task Group (SFTG) was deployed to Afghanistan in August or September 2005, operating in the southern province of Uruzgan. The SFTG consisted of elements from the SASR, 4 RAR (Commando), the Incident Response Regiment (IRR) and logistic support personnel. Two CH-47 Chinook helicopters from the 5th Aviation Regiment were deployed to Afghanistan in March 2006 to support the SFTG. A forward operating base was subsequently established at Tarin Kowt. This task group was withdrawn in September 2006, after a year of operations working closely with special forces from the United Kingdom and the Netherlands. During this period the task group was on patrol for 306 days, involved in 139 contacts, and sustained 11 soldiers wounded. The SFTG was replaced by a Reconstruction Taskforce made up of engineers and conventional infantry.

A 300-strong Special Operations Task Group (SOTG) was redeployed to Afghanistan to support the Reconstruction Taskforce in April 2007, including an SASR squadron, commando company group, and an integral combat service support team. The commando element was mostly used to conduct direct action tasks, with the SASR returning to conducting strategic reconnaissance. On 16 January 2009, Trooper Mark Donaldson was awarded the Victoria Cross for Australia, the highest award for gallantry in the Australian honours system, for gallant acts performed whilst serving with the SASR in Afghanistan on 2 September 2008 when his patrol was ambushed, resulting in the wounding of nine Australians. In addition to the SASR's contribution to the SOTG, the regiment also provided "Defence Support Teams" to protect Australian Secret Intelligence Service (ASIS) agents in Afghanistan.

On 23 January 2011, Corporal Ben Roberts-Smith was awarded the Victoria Cross for single-handedly neutralising two machine-gun positions during an operation in Tizak on 11 June 2010. On 26 March 2013, it was announced that Special Operations Command would receive the Australian Army's first battle honour since the end of the Vietnam War for outstanding performance during the Shah Wali Kot Offensive in Afghanistan from May to June 2010. The battle honour, titled "Eastern Shah Wali Kot", was awarded in recognition of the operational actions of the SASR and 2nd Commando Regiment from the Australian Special Operations Task Group Rotation XII. The SASR has also been collectively awarded the Meritorious Unit Citation and Unit Citation for Gallantry for its actions in Afghanistan.

The bulk of SOTG was withdrawn from Afghanistan in late 2013 as part of the Australian drawdown, although some special forces remain as part of the small Australian force in the country. SASR casualties in Afghanistan include five soldiers killed in action.

On 26 October 2018, a SASR dog, Kuga, was posthumously awarded the Dickin Medal for bravery on a patrol on 26 August 2011 in the Khas Uruzgan district in which he was shot five times attacking an insurgent positioned to ambush the patrol.

==== Alleged war crimes ====
During an operation in April 2013, an SASR corporal cut the right hands from the corpses of three insurgents after being told by a military lawyer that this would be an acceptable way of obtaining fingerprints. After this incident was reported to the senior Australian command at Tarin Kowt, the SOTG was withdrawn from operations for a week-long "operational pause". One soldier remained under investigation for this incident in August 2015, but was later cleared of all charges.

In 2018, it was reported that a small number of SASR personnel were being investigated for possibly committing war crimes in Afghanistan. The allegations include the murder of a detainee in September 2012. Major General Jeff Sengelman, the head of Special Operations Command, was also reported to have issued a memo in 2015 which expressed concern over standards of leadership and accountability within the Regiment, and invited troopers to write to him about any concerns. Sengelman regarded the SASR as having the worst disciplinary record of any unit in the Army. A 2015 report by the former head of ASIO David Irvine judged that the regiment was dysfunctional and affected by "arrogance, elitism and a sense of entitlement".

In 2020, further allegations arose of cover-ups and the deliberate killing of non-combatants. An inquiry by the Inspector General of the Australian Defence Force was expected to report to the Chief of the ADF later that year.

In November 2020, an investigation by Justice Paul Brereton into allegations of war crimes found that SAS troops had been involved in the murder of 39 Afghan civilians, with prisoners being killed to "blood" new troops, and weapons and radios planted to disguise the crimes. None of the killings were "in the heat of battle". The Inspector-General of the Australian Defence Force Afghanistan Inquiry Report was published in November 2020. The report stated that some of the incidents the inquiry uncovered constituted "possibly the most disgraceful episode in Australia's military history, and the commanders at troop, squadron and task group level bear moral command responsibility for what happened under their command, regardless of personal fault", though no information on these incidents was published on legal grounds. 36 incidents have been referred to the Australian Federal Police for prosecution, and the 2nd squadron will be disbanded in the wake of the findings and be replaced with a new sub-unit. The Chief of the ADF considered disbanding the SASR as a whole, but decided to pursue improvements to its culture instead.

In June 2023, a Federal Court judge found as part of a defamation action Roberts-Smith had initiated that it was "substantially true" he had killed a prisoner in Afghanistan during 2009 and ordered other SASR soldiers to kill two prisoners during 2009 and 2012. Several SASR soldiers who testified to support elements of Roberts-Smith's evidence were found to have not been reliable witnesses.

=== Iraq ===
The SASR provided the majority of the ground-force element of the Australian contribution to the 2003 U.S.-led invasion of Iraq, known as Operation Falconer, moving in quickly and successfully, thus enhancing Australia's standing amongst its allies. The Australian Special Forces Task Group was built around 1 Squadron, with a platoon from the 4 RAR (Commando) and a troop from the IRR available to support the SASR. 1 Squadron operated in Western Iraq as part of Combined Joint Special Operations Task Force-West (CJSOTF-West) where it was successful in securing its area of operations. B and C Troops of the SAS Squadron crossed the Iraqi border from Jordan on the night of 19 March by vehicle, penetrating 30 kilometres (19 mi) before engaging in one of the first actions of the war. A Troop was inserted by U.S. Army MH-47E helicopters with their vehicles over 600 kilometres (370 mi) from the staging base in Jordan. A Troop patrols were the closest coalition elements to Baghdad for a number of days, observing key roads and facilities. The Troops fought a number of actions over the following month including a raid on a radio relay station, while later they conducted highway interdiction tasks. Towards the conclusion of the 42-day campaign the SAS secured the huge but undefended Al Asad air base, approximately 200 kilometres (120 mi) west of Baghdad, capturing more than 50 air force fighter jets and helicopters with a large number inoperable, and repaired the runway that had been damaged by air strikes. 1 Squadron was withdrawn from Iraq without replacement shortly after the end of the war, and was subsequently awarded a Unit Citation for Gallantry.

A SASR Long Range Patrol Vehicle-mounted patrol in Iraq in 2003.

Yet some members of the SASR continued to operate in Iraq over the next few years in a number of roles. In 2004 claims appeared in the media that Australian special forces were involved in counter-insurgency operations inside Iraq, although this was denied by the government. An SASR team was deployed to Iraq in May and June 2005 as part the effort to free Douglas Wood, an Australian engineer kidnapped in Baghdad; however, he was later recovered alive by US and Iraqi forces. In 2007, British media reports suggested that SASR elements were still operating in Iraq, along the southern border with Iran, targeting arms smugglers. Later, a small number of SASR personnel were deployed to Iraq in June 2014 to protect the Australian embassy when the security of Baghdad was threatened by the 2014 Northern Iraq offensive, while others were reported to have been tasked with providing security to Royal Australian Air Force aircrew aboard transport aircraft delivering arms and munitions to forces in Kurdish-controlled northern Iraq during September 2014.

=== Timor Leste, the Philippines and Fiji ===
An SASR troop was deployed to Timor Leste in May 2006 as part of Operation Astute, operating alongside a Commando Company Group as part of the Special Forces Component following renewed unrest there. On 4 March 2007, along with the commandos, SASR personnel took part in the Battle of Same during which five rebels were killed during an unsuccessful attempt to apprehend the rebel leader, Alfredo Reinado. It was reported in October 2006 that 20 SASR operators were in the southern Philippines, supporting Filipino operations against the Abu Sayyaf and Jemaah Islamiah terrorist groups, but this was denied by the Department of Defence. Meanwhile, following tensions in Fiji between the military and the government the Australian Government dispatched three naval vessels in November and December 2006 as part of Operation Quickstep, in preparation for a potential evacuation of Australian citizens. On 29 November 2006, a Black Hawk helicopter from the 171st Aviation Squadron carrying four crew and six soldiers from the SASR crashed while attempting to land on HMAS Kanimbla and sank in international waters off Fiji. The helicopter's pilot and a soldier from SASR were killed in the crash.

=== Africa and special recovery planning ===
In March 2012, the Sydney Morning Herald reported that the fourth sabre squadron had been reraised in 2005 (Note: The Nightly reported in 2026 that the fourth sabre squadron had been reraised around 2006.) and that for many years it had been carrying out special recovery planning, gathering intelligence in Africa, specifically Zimbabwe, Nigeria and Kenya, to develop plans in case Australian civilians needed to be rescued from a hostile environment. The Squadron was reported to be working closely with the Swan Island based ASIS. Concerns within the SASR were reported that they would not be afforded legal protection the same as ASIS operatives if exposed and that there was no contingencies plans if they were detained. Professor Hugh White from the Australian National University was quoted as saying that, as soldiers, they would not have the legal cover ASIS would have if caught. The newspaper also reported that the then Minister for Foreign Affairs Kevin Rudd had argued for squadron to be used in Libya during the civil war, but was overruled by the Minister for Defence, Stephen Smith, and the Chief of the Defence Force, General David Hurley. The operations were not confirmed by the Minister for Defence. While, Rudd said the Libya claims were a "total, absolute, fabrication". However, it has been reported that the SASR has conducted intelligence gathering expeditions overseas since the late 1980s, during which a select few personnel have travelled for months at a time, with the first in Asia being to Laos, Cambodia and Burma.

== Organisation ==
The strength of the SASR is over 700 personnel. Based at Campbell Barracks, it is a battalion-sized element and is known to be made up of a regimental headquarters, three sabre squadrons, an operational support squadron, a specialist support squadron, and a signals squadron. In 2002 it was reported that two sabre squadrons (designated as contingency squadrons) were assigned to maintain the regiment's warfighting capability and that the third sabre squadron was designated as the Tactical Assault Group, with squadrons rotating through the two roles. In 2015, the existence of a fourth sabre squadron was acknowledged. In 2021 the seniority of the commander of the SASR was increased from a lieutenant colonel to a full colonel.

The regiment is currently believed to be organised as follows: (Note: 2 Squadron was to be disbanded, however, it has been reported that a ceremony to disband the squadron scheduled to take place in September 2021 was cancelled.)

- Regimental headquarters
  - 1 Squadron
  - 2 Squadron
  - 3 Squadron
  - 4 Squadron
  - Specialist Support Squadron
  - Operational Support Squadron
  - 152 Signal Squadron

Each sabre squadron is approximately 90-strong, and is divided into three troops (Water Troop, Free-Fall Troop and Vehicle Mounted Troop). A troop comprises four patrols with five or six operators in each patrol, and is commanded by a captain with each patrol commanded by a sergeant. For surveillance operations the SASR usually operates in patrols; however, for CT operations it usually employs larger force elements. Support personnel include signallers, mechanics and technicians, medical staff, storemen, drivers, caterers and various specialists. It was reported in 2012 that six female soldiers were being trained in the United States. As of 2003, 152 Signal Squadron comprised four troops. Military dogs, designated Special Operations Military Working Dog (SOMWD), have been members of the SASR since 2005, seeing service in Afghanistan and have their own memorial.

While the SASR is a regular army unit, it also has a pool of Army Reserve personnel. These soldiers are former regular Army members of the SASR or specialists.

Following the release of the Brereton Report into war crimes in Afghanistan, the Chief of the Defence Force General Angus Campbell announced in 2020 that 2 Squadron would be struck from the Army's order of battle due to its association with war crimes, and that over time the regiment would re-raise a differently titled squadron. The ceremony to disband the squadron scheduled to take place in September 2021 was cancelled by the then Minister for Defence Peter Dutton.

== Uniform and equipment ==
The standard dress of the regiment is the new Multicam-design camouflage which became standard issue to special forces troops in 2012, and is now being introduced to all other Australian Army soldiers in Afghanistan and will eventually become the standard Operational Combat Uniform (OCU). Although SASR parade, working and field uniforms are generally the same as those used by the rest of the Australian Army, special uniforms—including black coveralls—are used depending on the tactical situation. Qualified SASR members wear a sandy-coloured beret with a metal, gold and silver badge, depicting the sword Excalibur, with flames issuing upwards from below the hilt, with a scroll across the front of blade inscribed with the regimental motto "Who Dares Wins", on a black shield. (Note: The sandy-beret was adopted by the regiment in 1965, while prior to this the maroon airborne forces beret and badge of the Royal Australian Regiment was worn.) This differs from the British Special Air Service, which wears a woven cloth cap badge of the same design. SAS 'Ibis'-style parachute wings (rounded at the bottom and straight on top) are worn on the right shoulder on general duty, ceremonial and mess dress uniforms only. A garter blue lanyard is worn. Members of the regiment often dispense with rank, use first names, and wear long hair and beards on operations or when in the field.

Soldiers are armed with a variety of weapons systems depending on what the mission dictates. These include the M4A1 carbine (designated as the M4A5 in Australia), which is used as their primary weapon. The shortened version of the M4, known as the Mk 18 CQBR, is also used. The SIG-Sauer MCX is used in counter-terrorist and specialist roles, largely replacing the legacy MP5. Primary weapons are complemented with the two issued sidearms, the USP Tactical and the Glock 19. For medium to long range engagements the Heckler & Koch HK417, SR-25 marksman rifle, and Mk 14 Enhanced Battle Rifle are also used. Support weapons used include the Mk48 Maximi Modular, MAG 58 and the Para Minimi. Sniper rifles used have included the SR-98, Blaser Tactical 2, and Barrett M82A2. The regiment also uses a number of direct and indirect fire support weapons including 66 mm M72 rockets, 84 mm M3 MAAWS, FGM-148 Javelins, M2-QCB Browning .50 calibre machine guns, Mk 47 Striker grenade launchers, and mortars. Flash bang devices and fragmentation grenades are also used depending on the tactical situation, including the thermobaric Mk 14 Anti-Structure Munition (ASM-HG) which has reportedly been used in Afghanistan.

A range of different vehicles are used, including the Supacat High Mobility Transporter (HMT) Extenda with 31 purchased in 2007 designated the Special Operations Vehicle – Special Reconnaissance (SOV-SR), named "Nary" after a SASR warrant officer killed during pre-deployment training in 2005. The first Nary was delivered in 2008 but due to technical problems the vehicles did not enter service until 2011, replacing the Long Range Patrol Vehicle (LRPV) which had seen extensive service in Afghanistan and Iraq. New SOV-Logistics trucks are being acquired to replace the Mercedes-Benz Unimog for supply, support and recovery of the SOV-SR. A lighter, less protected vehicle, more akin to the LRPV—the Polaris Defense DAGOR (Deployable Advanced Ground Off-road)—was being trialled in 2015. Motorcycles are also used for long range strategic reconnaissance seeing service in Afghanistan. Polaris six-wheel all-terrain vehicles are also used, seeing service in Afghanistan. Heavily modified up-armoured Toyota Land Cruiser four wheel drive vehicles designated SOV-Support are used for domestic counter-terrorism and special recovery. The USMI 11m Naval Special Warfare Rigid Inflatable Boat designated Air Drop Rigid Hull Inflatable Boat (ADRHIB) is used for domestic counter-terrorism and special recovery. The Divex Shadow rebreather is used in diving operations.

== Selection and training ==
The SASR has high personnel standards, and selection into the regiment is considered the most demanding of any entry test in the Australian Army. Members of the SASR are required to work in small teams for extended periods and often without support, and are specially selected for their ability to work in this environment, rather than as individuals. Selection is open to all serving Australian Defence Force personnel. Candidates must complete the Special Force Screen Test at the Special Forces Training Centre, which tests their physical fitness, and also includes an interview. About 64 percent of applicants pass this test. Successful candidates then continue on to the 21-day SAS Selection Course which assesses both the individual's strength and endurance (mental and physical), as well as overall fitness, ability to remain calm in combat, and to work effectively in small teams. The course consists of four phases with the first two mainly of physical and navigational exercises held at the Bindoon Training Centre. The third and fourth phases are conducted in the Stirling Ranges with long pack marches in phase three and small group exercises in phase four with little or no sleep and food. Around 10 to 30 percent of candidates pass selection. These candidates then progress onto the 16-month reinforcement cycle, during which they complete a range of courses including weapons, basic patrolling, parachuting, combat survival, signaller / medic, heavy weapons, demolitions, method of entry, and urban combat before posting to a sabre squadron if successful and awarded their Sandy beret. Officers must complete additional courses to qualify as an officer in the regiment, with requisite expertise in operations, administration and command. Most candidates are generally in their late-20s and are on average older than most soldiers. In 2010, a two-hour documentary SAS: The Search for Warriors was produced on the selection course. Earlier in 1985, the documentary Battle for the Golden Road, had also been produced on the course.

The Review of Special Operations Command report in June 2020 by David Irvine recommended that SOCOMD introduce a joint selection course conducted by the Defence Special Operations Training and Education Centre for the regiment and the 2nd Commando Regiment rather than the units conduct their own individual selection courses. In 2024, the first joint selection course for the three SOCOMD combat units the SASR, 2nd Commando Regiment and the Reserve 1st Commando Regiment was held in Western Australia.

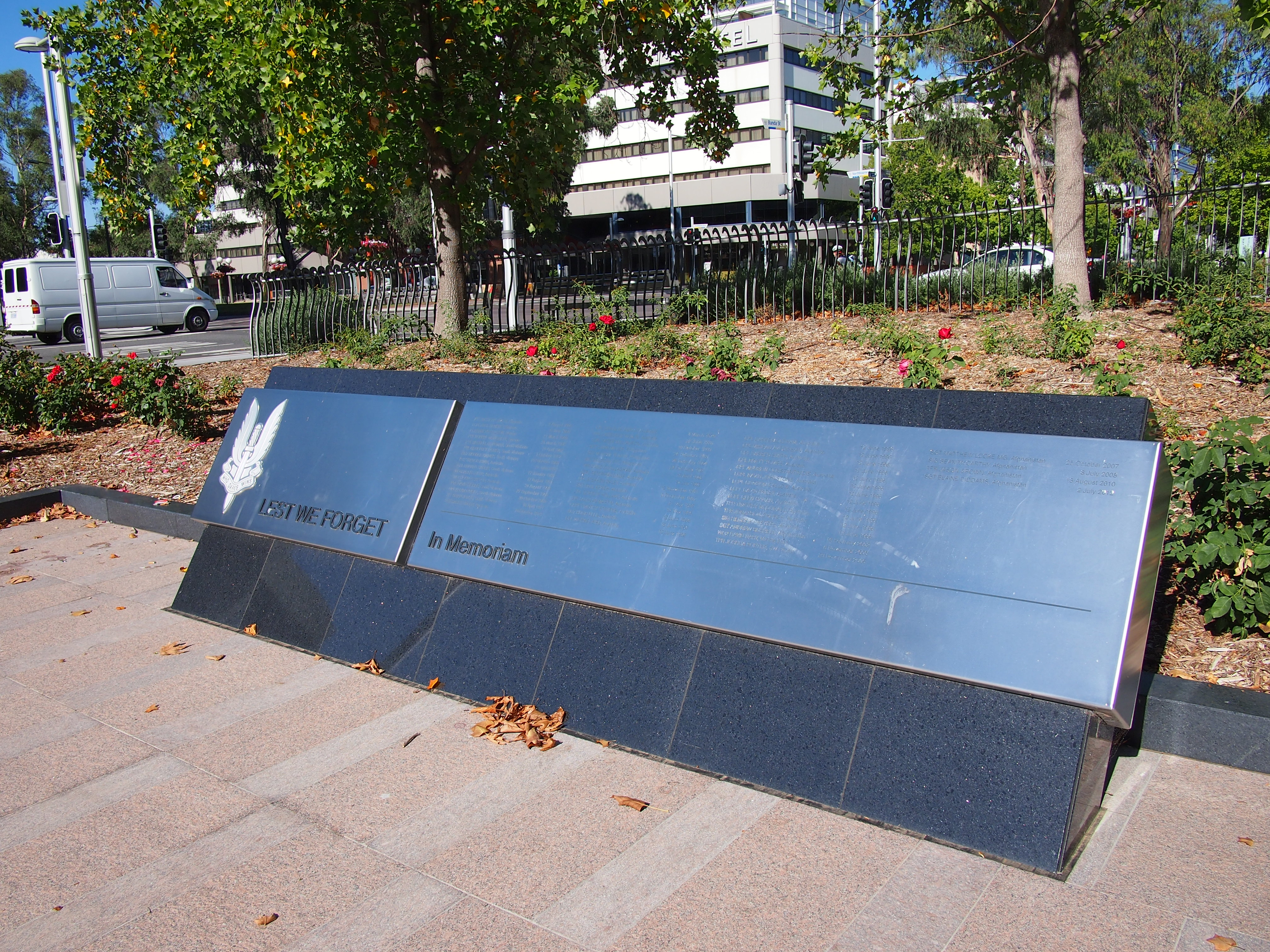
The Special Air Service Regiment Memorial in Canberra commemorates the members of the unit killed in combat and training exercises

All members of the SASR are parachute qualified, and each member of a patrol has at least one specialisation, including medic, signaller, explosive expert or linguist. Counter terrorist training includes close quarters battle (CQB), explosive entry, tubular assault (in vehicles such as in buses, trains and aircraft) and in high rise buildings, as well as room and building clearance. This training is conducted in a range of advanced facilities, including electronic indoor and outdoor CQB ranges, outdoor sniper range, and urban training facilities at Swanbourne. Additional facilities include a special urban complex, vertical plunging range, method of entry house, and simulated oil rig and aircraft mock-ups in order to provide realistic training environments for potential operational scenarios. Free-Fall training includes High Altitude Parachute Operations (HAPO) either High Altitude Low Opening (HALO) or High Altitude High Opening (HAHO) conducted at a maximum of 25,000 feet (7,600 metres). SASR personnel also provide training in weapons handling to ASIS operatives at Swan Island in Victoria. Despite a possible reduction in rank, SASR operators receive significant allowances, which make them among the highest-paid soldiers in the Australian Defence Force, with a trooper (equivalent to a private) reportedly earning about $100,000 per annum in 2006.

The SASR maintains close links with special forces from the United States, United Kingdom, New Zealand and Canada, regularly participating in joint exercises and individual personnel exchange programs with the British Special Air Service and Special Boat Service, Canada's Joint Task Force 2, the New Zealand Special Air Service and the United States Navy SEALs, SEAL Team Six, U.S. Army Special Forces and Delta Force. The regiment also regularly conducts exercises with and trains soldiers from South East Asian nations, and participates in exercises with regional special forces. From 1992 this has included close links with the Indonesian Kopassus, a relationship which has at times been politically controversial. Since its formation the SASR has lost more men in training than in combat, due to the nature of the training regime. In 2014, the regiment celebrated its 50th anniversary. During this period 48 soldiers have been killed during operations or in training accidents, while another 20 died in "other circumstances". More than 200 have been wounded. The names of those killed are recorded on a plaque on a memorial made of a large piece of granite outside the SASR headquarters at Campbell Barracks, known as "The Rock".

== Alliances ==
- United Kingdom – Special Air Service (Note: The SASR's alliance with the British SAS was approved in 1960 and reconfirmed in 1967, while an alliance with the Parachute Regiment was also approved in 1968. The alliance with the Parachute Regiment no longer appears to be maintained, with that regiment now allied with the 8th/9th Battalion, Royal Australian Regiment.)

== Notes ==
=== Sources ===
- "CQB weapon sought for Oz Special Forces". Australian Defence Magazine. Sydney: Yaffa Publishing Group. 4 August 2009. ISSN 1324-6550.
- "Two of our best lost in tragedy". Army: The Soldiers' Newspaper (1158 ed.). Canberra: Department of Defence. 14 December 2006. ISSN 0729-5685. Archived from the original on 21 March 2011.
- "Screen test for SF" (PDF). Army: The Soldiers' Newspaper (1235 ed.). Canberra: Department of Defence. 3 March 2011. p. 23. ISSN 0729-5685.
- "Recognising man's bravest friend". Army: The Soldiers' Newspaper (1308 ed.). Canberra: Department of Defence. 4 July 2013. p. 4. ISSN 0729-5685.
- "First of its kind: SASR runs inaugural K9 Symposium in Perth". Army: The Soldiers' Newspaper (1348 ed.). Canberra: Department of Defence. 9 April 2015. p. 23. ISSN 0729-5685.
- "Operations in Iraq – Firefights in Iraq's desert". Army: The Soldiers' Newspaper (1074 ed.). Canberra: Department of Defence. 22 May 2003. ISSN 0729-5685. Archived from the original on 4 June 2011.
- "SOCOMD changes focus". Army: The Soldiers' Newspaper (1548 ed.). Canberra: Department of Defence. 23 November 2023. ISSN 0729-5685.
- "SOCOMD Rough Terrain Vehicles". Australian & NZ Defender Magazine. Summer (92). Brisbane Market: Fullbore Magazines: 53. 2015. ISSN 1322-039X.
- "The Australian Army: An Aide-Memoire" (PDF). Australian Army. 2014. Archived from the original (PDF) on 18 November 2015.
- "The War in Iraq. ADF Operations in the Middle East in 2003" (PDF). Canberra, Australian Capital Territory: Department of Defence. 2004. OCLC 62536284.
- "Timor: Anzac Battle Group". Australian & NZ Defender Magazine. Winter (58). Brisbane Market: Fullbore Magazines: 22–26. 2007. ISSN 1322-039X.
- AAP (23 January 2010). "SAS Digger Awarded VC For Taking on Taliban". The Sydney Morning Herald. Sydney: Fairfax Media.
- Anderson, Paul (2002). When the Scorpion Stings: The History of the 3rd Cavalry Regiment, Vietnam, 1965–1972. Crows Nest, New South Wales: Allen & Unwin. ISBN 1-86508-743-2.
- Beurich, Cpl Sebastian (15 November 2018). "Heroics honoured" (PDF). Army: The Soldiers' Newspaper (1432 ed.). Canberra: Department of Defence. ISSN 0729-5685.
- Boer, Corinne (21 August 2008). "High level of treatment" (PDF). Army: The Soldiers' Newspaper (1196 ed.). Canberra: Department of Defence. p. 3. ISSN 0729-5685.
- Blaxland, John (2014). The Australian Army from Whitlam to Howard. Port Melbourne: Cambridge University Press. ISBN 9781107043657.
- Bonner, Stuart; Macklin, Robert (2014). Redback One: Explosive Action in East Timor, Iraq and Afghanistan: The True Story of an Australian SAS Hero. Sydney, New South Wales: Hachette Australia. ISBN 9780733630606.
- Bourke, Emily (13 March 2012). "Minister denies secret SAS squads operating illegally". The World Today. Australian Broadcasting Corporation.
- Brissenden, Michael (29 October 2014). "Charges being considered against SAS soldier for mutilating corpse". AM. Australian Broadcasting Corporation.
- Butterly, Nick (15 June 2011). "Rifle is a dud, says SAS veteran". The West Australian. Perth: Seven West Media. ISSN 0312-6323. Archived from the original on 3 June 2016.
- Callinan, Rory (16 March 2002). "SAS Destroys Taliban Anti-Aircraft Menace". The Courier Mail. Brisbane, Queensland: News Limited. p. 9. ISSN 1833-5772.
- Callinan, Rory (31 May 2005). "Phantoms of the Mountains". Time Magazine. ISSN 0040-781X. Archived from the original on 26 October 2007.
- Chant, Christopher (2013) [1988]. Handbook of British Regiments. London: Routledge. ISBN 9781134647248.
- Connors, Shaun (9 April 2014). "Briefing: Wheels of the Elite" (PDF). Jane's Defence Weekly. 51 (20). ISSN 0265-3818. Archived from the original (PDF) on 3 March 2016.
- Coulthard-Clark, Chris (2001). Where Australians Fought: The Encyclopaedia of Australia's Battles (Second ed.). Crows Nest, New South Wales: Allen & Unwin. ISBN 1-86508-634-7.
- Crosby, Ron (2009). NZSAS: The First Fifty Years. Auckland: Viking. ISBN 978-0-67-007424-2.
- Daley, Paul (29 August 2000). "Terms of Engagement". The Age. Melbourne: Fairfax Media. ISSN 0312-6307.
- Davis, Brian Leigh (1983). British Army Uniforms and Insignia of World War Two. London: Arms and Armour Press. ISBN 0-85368-609-2.
- Davis, Graham (30 April 2001). "You're Nicked Mate" (PDF). Navy News: The Official Newspaper of the Royal Australian Navy. Vol. 44, no. 8. Canberra: Department of Defence. pp. 1–2. OCLC 223485215.
- Davis, Mick (5 December 2013). "Snipers Hit the Mark: Snipers get fired up at SASR concentration in WA". Army: The Soldiers' Newspaper. Canberra: Directorate of Defence News. p. 11. ISSN 0729-5685.
- Dennis, Peter; Grey, Jeffrey (1996). Emergency and Confrontation: Australian Military Operations in Malaya and Borneo 1950–1966. The Official History of Australia's Involvement in Southeast Asian Conflicts 1948–1975. Vol. 5. St Leonards: Allen & Unwin. ISBN 1-86373-302-7.
- Dennis, Peter; Grey, Jeffrey; Morris, Ewan; Prior, Robin; Bou, Jean (2008). The Oxford Companion to Australian Military History (Second ed.). Melbourne: Oxford University Press. ISBN 978-0195517842.
- Department of Defence (2012). "Part Two Department of Defence Annual Report 2011–2012 Defence Material Organisation" (PDF). Annual Report (Australia. Dept. Of Defence). Canberra: Australian Government Publishing Service. ISSN 1323-5036.
- Dodd, Mark (22 September 2007). "Our Smoothest Operators". The Weekend Australian. Canberra: News Limited. p. 21. ISSN 1038-8761.
- Epstein, Rafael; Welch, Dylan (13 March 2012). "Secret SAS Teams Hunt For Terrorists". The Sydney Morning Herald. Sydney: Fairfax Media. p. 1.
- Farrell, John (2000). Peace Makers: INTERFETs Liberation of East Timor. Rocklea, Queensland: Fullbore. ISBN 0-646-39424-X.
- Farrell, John Hunter (2006). "Dili Madness: The ANZAC Intervention in Timor Leste". Australian & NZ Defender Magazine. Spring (55). Brisbane Market: Fullbore Magazines: 34. ISSN 1322-039X.
- Farrell, John Hunter (2011). "New Weapons and Equipment". Australian & NZ Defender Magazine. Summer (76). Brisbane Market: Fullbore Magazines: 8–9. ISSN 1322-039X.
- Fennell, Keith (2009). Warrior Training: The Making of an Australian SAS Soldier. North Sydney, New South Wales: Random House Australia. ISBN 9781742750149.
- Festberg, Alfred (1972). The Lineage of the Australian Army. Melbourne, Victoria: Allara Publishing. ISBN 978-0-85887-024-6.
- Foster, Duncan (20 October 2016). "Light-weight Lethality: Grenade Launcher Trials are Positive". Army: The Soldiers' Newspaper (1384 ed.). Canberra: Department of Defence. p. 5. ISSN 0729-5685.
- Gibson, Trevor (Autumn–Winter 2001). "The One That Didn't Get Away" (PDF). Journal of the Australian Naval Institute. 27 (1). Australian Naval Institute: 22–25. ISSN 0312-5807.
- Griffiths, Emma; Bourke, Emily (14 March 2012). "Smith Tight-lipped on SAS Africa Claims". ABC News. Australian Broadcasting Corporation.
- Gubler, Abraham (November 2008). "Enhancing the Land Environment – Army's Navy". Asia Pacific Defence Reporter. 34 (9): 12. ISSN 1446-6880. Archived from the original on 22 September 2015.
- Hamilton, Eamon (24 March 2016). "Buoyed by the success" (PDF). Army: The Soldiers' Newspaper (1369 ed.). Canberra: Department of Defence. p. 9. ISSN 0729-5685.
- Head, Michael (2009). Calling Out the Troops: The Australian Military and Civil Unrest: The Legal and Constitutional Issues. Annandale, New South Wales: Federation Press. ISBN 9781862877092.
- Heyer, Simone; Platz, Jess (30 September 2010). "Quest to be the best" (PDF). Army: The Soldiers' Newspaper (1245 ed.). Canberra: Department of Defence. pp. 18–19. ISSN 0729-5685.
- Horner, David (1989). SAS: Phantoms of the Jungle. A History of the Australian Special Air Service (First ed.). North Sydney, New South Wales: Allen & Unwin. ISBN 1-86373-007-9.
- Horner, David (1992). The Gulf Commitment: The Australian Defence Force's First War. Carlton, Victoria: Melbourne University Press. ISBN 9780522845112.
- Horner, David (2001). Making the Australian Defence Force. The Australian Centenary History of Defence. Vol. IV. Melbourne, Victoria: Oxford University Press. ISBN 0-19-554117-0.
- Horner, David (2002). SAS: Phantoms of War. A History of the Australian Special Air Service (Second ed.). Sydney, New South Wales: Allen & Unwin. ISBN 1-86508-647-9.
- Horner, David (2008). Duty First: A History of the Royal Australian Regiment (Second ed.). Crows Nest: Allen & Unwin. ISBN 978-1-74175-374-5.
- Horner, David; Thomas, Neil (2009). In Action With the SAS (Third ed.). Crows Nest, New South Wales: Allen & Unwin. ISBN 9781741755527.
- Horner, David; Connor, John (2014). The Good International Citizen: Australian Peacekeeping in Asia, Africa and Europe, 1991–1993. The Official History of Australian Peacekeeping, Humanitarian and Post-Cold War Operations. Vol. III. Port Melbourne, Victoria: Cambridge University Press. ISBN 978-1-107-02162-4.
- Horsfield, Bruce (2000). "Communication and the Postmodern Organisation: A Report of Qualitative Research on the Australian Special Air Service Regiment". The Electronic Journal of Communication. 10 (1 and 2). Communication Institute for Online Scholarship. ISSN 0021-9916. Archived from the original on 22 October 2013.
- Irvine, David (15 June 2020). Review of Special Operations Command - Australian Army (PDF) (Report). Australian Army. Archived from the original (PDF) on 17 April 2022.
- Jobson, Christopher (2009). Looking Forward, Looking Back: Customs and Traditions of the Australian Army. Wavell Heights, Queensland: Big Sky Publishing. ISBN 978-0-9803251-6-4.
- Kendrick, Anna-Maria (23 April 2015). "Tactical mobility boost for troops". Army: The Soldiers' Newspaper (1349 ed.). Canberra: Department of Defence. p. 5. ISSN 0729-5685.
- Kuring, Ian (2004). Redcoats to Cams: A History of Australian Infantry 1788–2001. Loftus, New South Wales: Australian Military Historical Publications. ISBN 1876439998.
- Lee, Sandra (2007). 18 Hours: The True Story of an SAS War Hero. Pymble, New South Wales: HarperCollins. ISBN 978-0-73228-246-2.
- Lee, Jane; Wroe, David; Darby, Andrew (23 August 2015). "Liberal candidate Andrew Hastie says he has been cleared of wrongdoing in Afghan war incident". The Canberra Times. Canberra: Fairfax Media. ISSN 0157-6925.
- Linton, CMDR (Rtd) E.W. Jake; Donohue, CMDR (Rtd) H.J. (Hec) (2015). United and Undaunted : the First 100 years : A History of Diving in the Royal Australian Navy 1911-2011. Queanbeyan: Grinkle Pres. ISBN 9780980282153.
- Lord, Cliff; Tennant, Julian (2000). ANZAC Elite: The Airborne and Special Forces Insignia of Australia and New Zealand. Wellington, New Zealand: IPL Books. ISBN 0-908876-10-6.
- MacKenzie, Hugh (8 March 2006). "Hard Slog Pays Big Dividends". Army: The Soldiers' Newspaper (1138 ed.). Canberra: Department of Defence. ISSN 0729-5685. Archived from the original on 26 June 2013.
- Masters, Chris (2012). Uncommon Soldier: Brave, Compassionate, Tough. The Making of Australia's Modern Day Diggers. Crows Nest, New South Wales: Allen & Unwin. ISBN 978-1-74175-971-6.
- Maylor, Rob; Macklin, Robert (2010). SAS Sniper: The World of an Elite Australian Marksman. Sydney, New South Wales: Hachette Australia. ISBN 9780733624957.
- McLucas, Alan C. (2003). "Worst Failure–Failure To Learn About Risks". Decision Making: Risk Management, Systems Thinking and Situation Awareness. Canberra: Argos Press. pp. 43–68. ISBN 978-0-9580238-2-5.
- McPhedran, Ian (2005). The Amazing SAS: The Inside Story of Australia's Special Forces. Sydney, New South Wales: HarperCollins. ISBN 0-7322-7981-X.
- McPhedran, Ian (2007). The Amazing SAS: The Inside Story of Australia's Special Forces. Pymble, New South Wales: Harper Collins Publishers. ISBN 978-0-7322-7984-4.
- McPhedran, Ian (14 March 2012). "The truth about our secret SAS agents". The Advertiser. Adelaide, South Australia: News Corporation. ISSN 1039-4192. Archived from the original on 15 March 2012.
- McPhedran, Ian (29 October 2013). "Our Afghan War Ends Not With Victory, Nor Defeat". The Australian. Canberra: News Limited. pp. 1–11. ISSN 1038-8761. Archived from the original on 29 October 2013.
- Micheletti, Eric (2003). Special Forces: War on Terrorism in Afghanistan 2001–2003. Paris: Histoire & Collections. ISBN 2-913903-90-8.
- Mickelburough, Peter (21 April 2003). "Ship Seized: Navy, Army Halt Heroin Freighter". Herald Sun. Melbourne: News Limited. p. 1. ISSN 1038-3433.
- Middleton, Karen (2011). An Unwinnable War: Australia in Afghanistan. Melbourne, Victoria: Melbourne University Press. ISBN 9780522857665.
- Miller, David (2002). Illustrated Directory of Special Forces. Saint Paul, Minnesota: MBI Publishing. ISBN 0760314195.
- Muir, Tony (1 October 2008). "Land Warfare – Vehicles: Special vehicles for Special Operations". Australian Defence Magazine. Sydney: Yaffa Publishing Group: 46–48. ISSN 1324-6550.
- Neville, Leigh (2008). Special Operations Forces in Afghanistan. Botley, Oxford: Osprey. ISBN 978-1-84603-310-0.
- Neville, Leigh (2011). Special Operations Patrol Vehicles: Afghanistan and Iraq. New Vanguard. Oxford: Osprey Publishing. ISBN 9781849081870.
- Neville, Leigh (2016). Guns of Special Forces 2001–2015. Barnsley, South Yorkshire: Pen & Sword. ISBN 9781473881013.
- Neville, Leigh (2019). The Elite: The A-Z of Modern Special Operations Forces. Oxford, UK: Osprey Publishing. ISBN 978-1-4728-2429-5. OCLC 1121376225.
- Nicholson, Brendan (10 April 2007). "Swan Island: Top Secret Training Area For Agents". The Age. Melbourne: Fairfax Media. p. 2. ISSN 0312-6307.
- Nicholson, Brendan (12 September 2008). "Remains Found in Vietnam of Digger Missing in Action for 39 Years". The Age. Melbourne: Fairfax Media. p. 5. ISSN 0312-6307.
- O'Brien, Hugh (2014). Undaunted: From Clearance Diver to Mercenary: An Australian Man's Life on the Edge. North Sydney, New South Wales: Random House Australia. ISBN 9780857983480.
- Palmer, Clint; Macklin, Robert (2014). SAS Insider. Sydney, New South Wales: Hachette Australia. ISBN 978-0733629594.
- Pugliese, David (2003). Shadow Wars: Special Forces in the New Battle Against Terrorism. Ottawa, Ontario: Esprit de Corps Books. ISBN 1-895896-24-X.
- Sheridan, Greg (14 October 2006). "Behind the Scenes Special Forces Wage War By Stealth". The Weekend Australian. Canberra: News Limited. p. 22. ISSN 1038-8761. Archived from the original on 13 February 2009.
- Sheridan, Greg (2007). The Partnership: The Inside Story of the US-Australian Alliance Under Bush and Howard. Sydney, New South Wales: University of New South Wales Press. ISBN 9780868409221.
- Shortt, James; McBride, Angus (1981). The Special Air Service. London: Osprey Publishing. ISBN 0-85045-396-8.
- Slocombe, Geoff (November 2012). "Project Redfin – Special Operations Mobility and Information Environment Upgrades". Asia Pacific Defence Reporter. 38 (9): 10–12. ISSN 1446-6880.
- Smith, Greg (20 November 2003). "Working Outside the Square: Training with the SASR". Army: The Soldiers' Newspaper (1087 ed.). Canberra: Department of Defence. ISSN 0729-5685. Archived from the original on 26 June 2013.
- Stephens, Alan (2001). The Royal Australian Air Force. The Australian Centenary History of Defence. Vol. II. Melbourne: Oxford University Press. ISBN 0-19-554115-4.
- Toohey, Brian (28 August 2004). "Troops' Secret Role in Iraq". Australian Financial Review. Melbourne: Fairfax Media. ISSN 1444-9900. Archived from the original on 2 May 2007.
- Uhlmann, Chris (22 October 2014). "Defence investigating allegation special forces soldier threatened female ASIS agent in Afghanistan with gun". ABC News. Australian Broadcasting Corporation.
- Walker, Frank (19 January 2003). "SAS Revved Up for a Fast Ride in Iraqi Desert". The Sun-Herald. Sydney: Fairfax Media. p. 7. ISSN 1323-1987.
- Walters, Patrick (6 October 2006). "Unfinished Business". The Australian. Canberra: News Limited. p. 11.
- Welch, Dylan (30 December 2010). "Army had concerns over Supacat buy". The Age. Melbourne: Fairfax Media. ISSN 0312-6307.
- Welch, Dylan (13 March 2012). "The Secret Soldiers". The Canberra Times. Canberra: Fairfax Media. ISSN 0157-6925.
- Wright, Tony (25 February 2003). "Band of Brothers". The Bulletin. 121 (6361). Sydney: Australian Consolidated Press: 20–25. ISSN 0007-4039.
- Wroe, David (31 August 2014). "SAS to Protect Crews on Arms Drops in Iraq". The Sydney Morning Herald. Sydney: Fairfax Media.
