= Eitam =

Eitam is a name in Hebrew. It may refer to:

- Eitam / G550 CAEW, The Israeli variant of the Gulfstream G550 business aircraft
- Effi Eitam, an Israeli politician and military veteran
- The former Israeli Eitam Air Force Base, located in El Gorah, Egypt
