= TFS =

TFS may refer to:

== Organisations ==
- Task Force Sinai
- Tasmania Fire Service
- Texas Forest Service
- Toronto Fire Services
- Toronto French School
- Toyota Financial Services

== Other uses ==
- Team Foundation Server, Microsoft source code lifecycle management software
- Tenerife–South Airport (IATA code)
- Tramway Français Standard, a type of tram
- Tropical Fuck Storm, an Australian rock band
- The Forever Story, a 2022 album by American rapper JID
- TeamFourStar, a production company and YouTube channel
