= Operation Gold (disambiguation) =

Operation Gold may refer to:

- Operation Gold, a joint US/UK intelligence-gathering operation in Berlin in the 1950s
- Operation Gold (Australia), Australian Defence Force support to the 2000 Summer Olympics in Sydney
- Balearic Caper or Operation Gold, Spanish-Italian-French heist film
