= Michael Garraway =

Australian army officer

- Education: Royal Military College, Duntroon; Australian Command and Staff College
- Military career
- Allegiance: Australia
- Branch: Australian Army
- Service years: 1992–present
- Rank: Major General
- Unit: Royal Australian Infantry Corps
- Commands: Multinational Force and Observers (2024–); Operation COVID-19 Assist (2020–22); Operation Bushfire Assist (2019–20); 5th Brigade (2019–21); 7th Battalion, Royal Australian Regiment (2009–12)
- Conflicts: Iraq War; Operation Mazurka
- Awards: Member of the Order of Australia; Conspicuous Service Cross; Bronze Star Medal (United States)

Major General Michael Edward Garraway, AM, CSC is a senior officer in the Australian Army. He graduated from the Royal Military College, Duntroon in 1993 and was commissioned into the Royal Australian Infantry Corps. He has commanded the 7th Battalion, Royal Australian Regiment (2009–12) and the 5th Brigade (2019–21), and served as commander Operation Bushfire Assist (2019–20) and Operation COVID-19 Assist (2020–22). In 2024 he was appointed Force Commander of the Multinational Force and Observers.

== Military career ==
Garraway entered the Royal Military College, Duntroon, in 1992, and on graduating in 1993 was commissioned into the Royal Australian Infantry Corps He was initially attached to the 5th/7th Battalion, Royal Australian Regiment before being promoted to captain and serving as adjutant and operations officer in the 1st/19th Battalion, Royal New South Wales Regiment. In 2002 he was attached on exchange with the Irish Guards, participating in Operation Telic for the 2003 invasion of Iraq.

Garraway assumed the command of the 7th Battalion, Royal Australian Regiment in December 2009 until 2012. In the 2013 Australia Day Honours, he was appointed a Member of the Order of Australia (AM) for "exceptional service in the field of officer career management in 2009 and as Commanding Officer, 7th Battalion, the Royal Australian Regiment, from 2010 to 2012."

Garraway was appointed commander of the 5th Brigade in 2019 before assuming the joint role of commander of Operation Bushfire Assist from 2019 to 2020 (Joint Task Force 1110). He then became deputy commander of the 2nd Division, and served as commander of Operation COVID-19 Assist (Joint Task Force 629) from 2020 to 2022. He was awarded the Conspicuous Service Cross (CSC) in the 2021 Queen's Birthday Honours for "outstanding achievement in the application of exceptional skills, judgement and dedication as the Commander of Joint Task Force 1110, Operation BUSH FIRES ASSIST 2019–2020 and as Commander of Joint Task Group 629.1, Operation COVID-19 ASSIST".

In 2022, Garraway was one of 39 members of the Australian Defence Force to march through London for the funeral of Queen Elizabeth II.

In February 2024, Garraway was appointed Force Commander of the Multinational Force and Observers, replacing Major General Evan Williams of New Zealand. He assumed command on 17 March 2024.

Military offices
Preceded by Major General Evan Williams	Force Commander, Multinational Force and Observers; 2024–present	Incumbent
