= Peter Gilmore (disambiguation) =

Peter Gilmore (1931–2013) was a British actor.

Peter Gilmore may also refer to:

- Peter Gilmore (chef) (born 1968), Australian chef
- Peter H. Gilmore (born 1956), American Satanist
- Gus Gilmore (Peter Warwick Gilmore, born 1962), Australian general

== See also ==
- Peter Gilmour, Australian sailor
