= El Gora Airport =

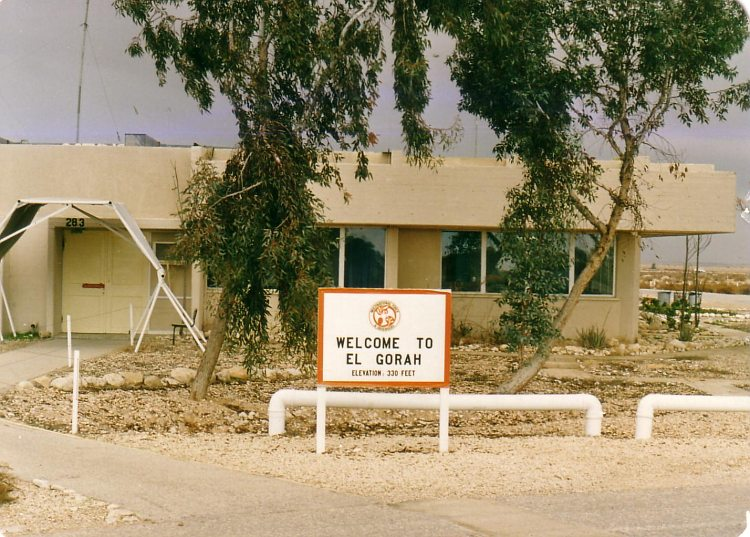
- IATA: none; ICAO: HEGR

Summary
- Serves: El Gorah, Egypt
- Elevation AMSL: 324 ft / 99 m
- Coordinates: 31°04′30″N 34°08′10″E

Map
- Location of the airport in Egypt

Runways
Direction	Length		Surface
Direction	m	ft	Surface
08/26	2,196	7,205	Paved
17/35	1,219	3,999	Paved

El Gora Airport (ICAO: HEGR) is an airport serving the town of El Gorah, in the North Sinai Governorate of Egypt, 10 miles (16 km) from the border with Israel, and 13 miles (21 km) from the southern tip of the Gaza Strip. The airport was originally built by Israel as the Eitam Air Force Base.

== Eitam Air Force Base ==
The airport was originally built by the Israeli Air Force as the Eitam Air Force Base (25th Wing). The airbase was the last airbase established in the Sinai Peninsula by the Israeli Air Force. The base was inaugurated in December 1976. Next to the base there were permanent buildings for the soldiers and commanders of the base, where they lived with their families, buildings that received the name "Camp Nurit" which was part of a naval base. At the same time, the Israeli Air Force operated three more major bases in Sinai: Ofir, Etzion and Rafidim, which gave the IDF spatial protection over the entire area of the Sinai Peninsula.

The former base is located about 19 km south of the former settlement of Yamit and 37 km east of El Arish. It was built as part of Israeli military strategic thinking, according to which the El Arish area would remain in Israel's hands permanently, also within the framework of future peace agreements. The area was a strategic point, because during the various Israeli-Egyptian wars, it was one of the main conflict points. In the end, unlike the other air bases in Sinai, Eitam Air Force Base did not participated in operational combat, and did not prove its operational necessity.

Initially, the base was used only as a deployment base, which operated F-4 Phantom and Mirage aircraft, but starting from October 1976, Squadron 253 ("Negev Squadron") of Nesher and later Mirage aircraft was operated from it on a permanent basis. At the same time as its regular activity, the base continued to serve as a deployment base.

In 1979, with the signing of the Egypt–Israel peace treaty in which it was agreed to evacuate the Sinai Peninsula and return it to Egypt, the base and its various facilities were evacuated to the Ramon Airbase in the Negev, which was established by the United States following the evacuation, and which received the number of Eitam base (25) and its symbol. The last fighter squadron that resided there departed from the base in October 1981.

After the evacuation of Sinai, an Australian helicopter squadron was operated from the base for some time as part of the Multinational Force and Observers, for the purpose of monitoring the fulfillment of the Egyptian–Israeli agreement.

== Today ==
Today, the airport is called "El Gora Airport", and it is practically inactive except for the landing of light aircraft and helicopters of the Multinational Force and Observers, which is still stationed there.

== Incidents ==
- On August 15, 2005, an explosion occurred near the airport, destroying a minibus used by the Multinational Force and Observers (MFO), and wounding two Canadian soldiers.
- On May 6, 2007, a French DHC-6 Twin Otter aircraft belonging to the Multinational Force and Observers (MFO) took off from the airport and crashed near El-Thamad.

== See also ==
- Transport in Egypt
- List of airports in Egypt
