= Gus Gilmore =

Australian general (born 1962)

Peter Warwick Gilmore
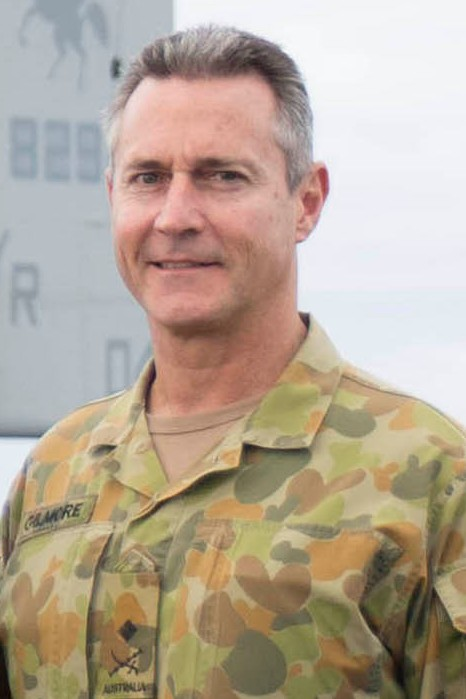
- Gus Gilmore in 2014
- Born: 31 January 1962 (age 64); Sydney, New South Wales
- Military career
- Allegiance: Australia
- Branch: Australian Army
- Service years: 1979–2019
- Rank: Major General
- Nickname: Gus
- Commands: Military Strategic Commitments Division (2016–19); Forces Command (2015–16); Deputy Chief of Army (2013–15); Special Operations Command (2011–13); International Security Assistance Force Special Operations Forces (2009–10); Coalition Advisory Support Team (2005–06); Special Air Service Regiment (2001–02)
- Conflicts: War in Afghanistan; Iraq War
- Awards: Officer of the Order of Australia; Distinguished Service Cross; Officer of the Legion of Merit (United States); Bronze Star Medal (United States); Meritorious Service Medal (United States)

Major General Peter Warwick "Gus" Gilmore (born 31 January 1962) is a retired senior officer of the Australian Army. A graduate of the Royal Military College, Duntroon, he was commissioned into the Royal Australian Infantry Corps in 1983 and spent much of his career in special forces. He commanded the Special Air Service Regiment (2001–02), led the first contingent of the Australian Special Operations Task Group in Afghanistan (2001–02), was responsible for the Coalition Advisory Support Team in Iraq (2005–06), and commanded International Security Assistance Force Special Operations Forces (2009–10). Following promotion to major general he held a succession of senior appointments, including Special Operations Commander Australia (2011–13), Deputy Chief of Army (2013–15), and Commander Forces Command (2015–16). His final appointment was as Head Military Strategic Commitments Division from 2016 to 2019.

== Early life and education ==
Peter Warwick Gilmore was born on 31 January 1962 in Sydney, New South Wales, the youngest of three children to Ian George Charles Gilmore and Alison Shirley Gilmore (née Cayley). Ian Gilmore was an officer in the Australian Army who saw service in the Second World War, Korean War and Vietnam War, and rose to the rank of brigadier.

Gilmore was educated at Canberra Grammar School and later Geelong College in Victoria, graduating in 1978. Aged 17, he entered the Royal Military College, Duntroon in January 1979 as an Australian Army officer cadet. He graduated from Duntroon with a Bachelor of Arts degree from the affiliated University of New South Wales, and was commissioned a lieutenant in the Royal Australian Infantry Corps on 14 December 1983. He later read for a Master of Arts in International Relations at Deakin University. He is a graduate of the Royal Military College of Science in the United Kingdom, the Australian Army Command and Staff College, the Australian Centre for Defence and Strategic Studies, and the Australian Institute of Company Directors.

== Military career ==
=== Early career and regimental command ===
Gilmore was initially posted to the 8th/9th Battalion, Royal Australian Regiment as a platoon commander, later serving with the Infantry Centre in Singleton, New South Wales, and the 4th/3rd Battalion, Royal New South Wales Regiment in Sydney. In 1988, Gilmore passed selection and was appointed to the Special Air Service Regiment (SASR). For over a decade he filled various appointments in the SASR, including as a troop commander, adjutant, operations research officer, and squadron commander, rising to the command of the regiment in 2001. That year, he was selected as a recipient of the Centenary Medal in recognition of his "service to Australian society through the Australian Army".

Gilmore's period as commanding officer of the SASR coincided with Operation Slipper, Australia's initial commitment to the War in Afghanistan. The Australian government decided to deploy a Special Operations Task Group, which was to include 1 Squadron SASR under Major Daniel McDaniel. The contingent embarked in October, with Gilmore in command. The Task Group deployed via Diego Garcia and Kuwait to Kandahar Province in southern Afghanistan. There, Gilmore's men worked alongside United States Marines in Brigadier General Jim Mattis's Combined Task Force 45 to eliminate terrorist save havens by disrupting Taliban and Al Qaeda elements in the region. After more than three months of heavy activity, during which 1 Squadron SASR was involved in intelligence, surveillance and reconnaissance missions, Gilmore was succeeded in command of the Australian Special Operations Task Group by Lieutenant Colonel Rowan Tink on 1 February 2002. Three squadrons of the SASR completed operational rotations in Afghanistan over the first twelve months, receiving praise from Mattis and other coalition partners for their efficiency and effectiveness. The squadrons' achievements were recognised with the Meritorious Unit Citation, while Gilmore was awarded the Distinguished Service Cross (DSC) and the United States Bronze Star Medal. The citation for Gilmore's DSC praised his "distinguished and inspirational leadership" in Afghanistan, noting that he "demonstrated an exceptionally high level of leadership and remarkably fine political acumen."

=== Rise to senior command ===
In 2003, Gilmore was posted to Australian Army Headquarters in Canberra as Director of Strategy and International Engagement. He was soon after seconded to the Department of the Prime Minister and Cabinet, where he spent eighteen months working in the National Security Division. Promoted brigadier in November 2005, Gilmore deployed to Baghdad to lead the Coalition Advisory Support Team in the Iraqi Joint Headquarters. His work supported coalition operations in the Iraq War, including those of the Australian forces deployed on Operation Catalyst; he was awarded the Officer of the Legion of Merit from the United States government for his services in the role. He returned to Australia in 2006 and occupied a series of staff positions at Army Headquarters, including Director General of Defence Public Affairs and Director General Future Land Warfare, and as chief of staff at Headquarters Special Operations Command. Gilmore's "exceptional service" in these posts led to his appointment as a Member of the Order of Australia in the Queen's Birthday Honours of June 2009.

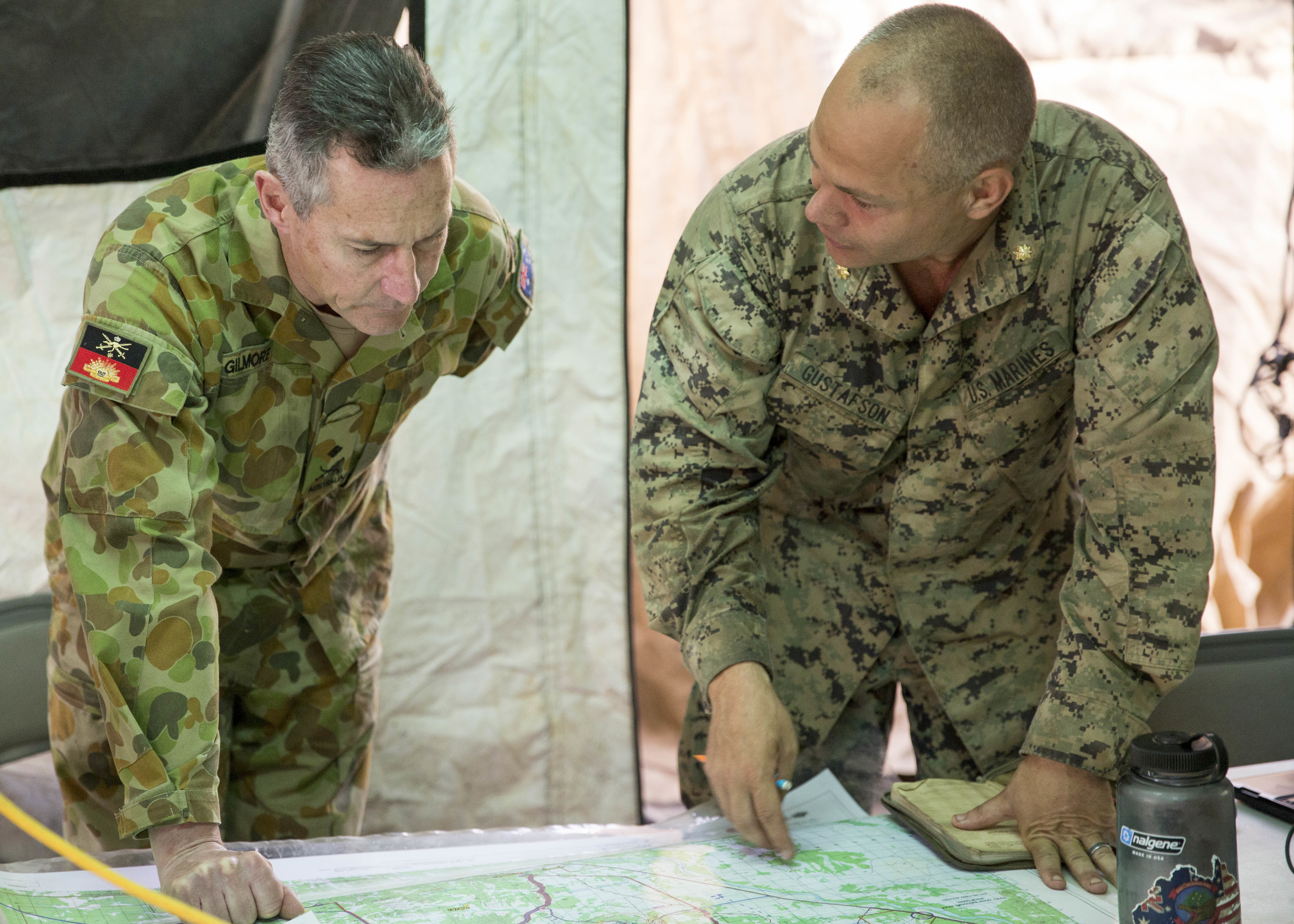
Gilmore (left) discusses troop movements with a United States Marine Corps major during a training exercise in the Northern Territory, August 2015.

Gilmore was selected to command the Special Operations Forces assigned to the International Security Assistance Force (ISAF), and redeployed to Afghanistan to take up the role in October 2009. The posting lasted twelve months and, on his return to Australia, he was promoted major general and succeeded Major General Tim McOwan as Special Operations Commander Australia (SOCAUST) in January 2011. As SOCAUST, Gilmore was responsible to both the Chief of Army and Chief of Joint Operations for the training, capability development, and operations of Australia's special forces. In November 2012, Gilmore represented the Australian Army and Special Operations Command during the reinterment of two Australian soldiers at Port Moresby (Bomana) War Cemetery. Both men had been killed while serving with Z Special Unit during the Second World War.

Gilmore was appointed an Officer of the Order of Australia in the 2013 Queen's Birthday Honours. The award recognised "his outstanding leadership and commitment to Special Operations Command" as SOCAUST and commander ISAF Special Operations Forces. Three months later, on 20 September, he succeeded Major General Angus Campbell as Deputy Chief of Army. He occupied the role for sixteen months, before being appointed Commander Forces Command on 23 January 2015. Based at Victoria Barracks, Sydney, in this role he was responsible for the training, development and sustainment of the bulk of the Australian Army's forces and training establishments, including its infantry and aviation brigades and the Army Recruit Training Centre. In December 2016, he became Head Military Strategic Commitments Division within the Vice Chief of Defence Force Group, with purview for the strategic management of potential and present commitments for the Australian Defence Force. He relinquished the appointment and retired in 2019.

== Personal life ==
Gilmore is married and has three children. An active sportsman, he enjoys running, surfing, and spectating rugby union.

== Bibliography ==
- Davies, Andrew; Jennings, Peter; Scheer, Benjamin (2014). A Versatile Force: The Future of Australia's Special Operations Capability (PDF). Barton, Australian Capital Territory: Australian Strategic Policy Institute. ISBN 9781921302978.
- Lee, Sandra (2006). 18 Hours: The True Story Of A Modern Day Australian SAS War Hero. Sydney: Harper Collins Australia. ISBN 978-0-7322-8246-2.
- Masters, Chris (2012). Uncommon Soldier: Brave, Compassionate and Tough, the Making of Australia's Modern Diggers. Sydney: Allen & Unwin. ISBN 978-1-74175-971-6.
- Masters, Chris (2017). No Front Line: Australia's Special Forces at War in Afghanistan. Sydney: Allen & Unwin. ISBN 978-1-76011-114-4.
- McPhedran, Ian (2013). Too Bold To Die: The Making of Australian War Heroes. Sydney: HarperCollins Australia. ISBN 978-0-7322-9023-8.

Military offices
Preceded by Major General John Frewen	Head Military Strategic Commitments Division; 2016–2019	Succeeded by Rear Admiral Jaimie Hatcher
Preceded by Major General Michael Slater	Commander Forces Command; 2015–2016	Succeeded by Major General Gus McLachlan
Preceded by Major General Angus Campbell	Deputy Chief of Army; 2013–2015	Succeeded by Major General Rick Burr
Preceded by Major General Tim McOwan	Special Operations Commander Australia; 2011–2013	Succeeded by Brigadier Daniel McDaniel (acting)
