= Sinai Field Mission =

The Sinai Field Mission (SFM) began operations in January 1976. SFM operations officially ceased in April 1982 when the Multinational Force and Observers (MFO) came into existence. The SFM was composed of United States Department of State personnel primarily attached to the U.S. Agency for International Development (USAID) and civilian contractors from the Greenville, Texas based aerospace company E-Systems, Inc., (ESY). There were approximately 160 personnel occupying the Base Camp located on the peak of Mt. Umm Kashieb on the Sinai Peninsula. Living quarters consisted of moderately sized concrete rooms (prefabricated Holiday Inn modules shipped from the U.S.) that were occupied by one to three personnel depending on their employment status.

== History ==
Without third-party monitoring, regional conflicts are more likely to escalate. Cooperative monitoring, when incorporated into a regional security agreement, can help counter these pressures. Egypt and Israel set a precedent for successful cooperative monitoring when they progressed from a state of war to peace within six years. The process occurred in several steps, and monitoring played a significant supporting role.

In 1975, Israel made a key compromise to withdraw from the strategic Giddi Pass and Mitla Pass in the Sinai Peninsula in exchange for monitoring by third parties. The United States established the Sinai Field Mission to monitor access to the passes utilizing seismic, aural and infra-red sensors monitored from three watch stations. The U.S. military also performed reconnaissance flights. U.S. monitoring was coordinated with the activities of UN peacekeepers. After an initial period of suspicion, the parties came to accept monitoring as routine. The system successfully distinguished between significant and inconsequential sensor activations. All violations were relatively minor and resolved by a Joint Commission. Political leaders in both countries eventually praised the system.

The increased confidence resulting from cooperative monitoring was a major contributor to the 1979 Egypt-Israel Peace Accord. Agreement on the establishment of the MFO superseded the SFM, and the SFM was closed on April 25, 1982.
