= Gary Byles =

Australian brigadier

- Military career
- Allegiance: Australia
- Branch: Australian Army
- Service years: 1972–2003
- Rank: Brigadier
- Commands: 5th Brigade; Joint Task Force Gold
- Awards: Conspicuous Service Cross
- Other work: Director-General Department of Territory and Municipal Services (2009–16)

Brigadier Gary Byles, CSC is a retired senior public servant and a former Australian Army officer.

== Military career ==
Byles joined the Australian Army in 1972 and, after training at the Officer Training Unit, Scheyville, graduated from the Officer Cadet School, Portsea in December as a commissioned officer. He spent almost 32 years in the army, his career culminating with his promotion to brigadier and command of Joint Task Force Gold in 2000, the Australian Defence Force unit formed to provide security and general support for the 2000 Summer Olympics held in Sydney, Australia. Byles was awarded the Conspicuous Service Cross for his "outstanding achievement" in this role. Byles then went on to command the 5th Brigade before his retirement from the army in 2003.

== Public servant ==
After leaving the army, Byles was Sheriff of New South Wales from 2003 to 2007. He joined the ACT Department of Territory and Municipal Services (TAMS) as the Executive Director for Enterprise Services in 2007. He was made Chief Executive (later retitled Director-General) of TAMS in June 2009, and concurrently served as the ACT government's appointee to the board of the Canberra Convention Bureau. After almost seven years as Director-General, Byles retired in April 2016.

== Education ==
Byles holds a Bachelor of Social Science and an Executive Masters of Public Administration.
