= Operation Mazurka =

- Part of Multinational Force and Observers
- Location: Sinai Peninsula
- Objective: Overseeing the terms of the peace treaty between Egypt and Israel
- Date: 1981 – ongoing
- Executed by: Australia

Operation Mazurka is the Australian Defence Force's (ADF) contribution to the Multinational Force and Observers (MFO), an international peacekeeping force, based in the Sinai Peninsula, overseeing the terms of the Israel-Egypt Peace Treaty.

The MFO operates from two secure bases:

- North Camp, located at El Gorah in the Northern Sinai, and
- South Camp, located at Sharm el-Sheikh.

The Australian personnel operate predominantly in South Camp.

Australia was an original contributor to the MFO with a joint Australian-New Zealand rotary wing squadron deployed in 1981. In 1993, Australia returned to the MFO with an ADF contingent of 25 personnel. Since that time approximately 1,200 personnel have deployed on Operation Mazurka. The ADF contingent operates on a 6 monthly posting cycle, with a part of the contingent rotating every 3 months.

== Role ==
The mission of the MFO is:

"...to supervise the implementation of the security provisions of the Israel-Egypt Peace Treaty and employ best efforts to prevent any violation of its terms."

The ADF contingent performs various staff functions in the MFO Headquarters, as well as providing the Force Regimental Signals Officer, Security Sergeants to work with the Colombian Infantry Battalion for the base security at North Camp and Operational and Training staff to the MFO.
