= Task Force Sinai =

American peacekeeping unit

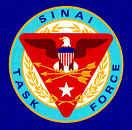
- TFS emblem.
- Founded: 1982−present
- Allegiance: Multinational Force and Observers

Commanders
- COM TFS: Colonel United States Army (dual-hatted CoS MFO)

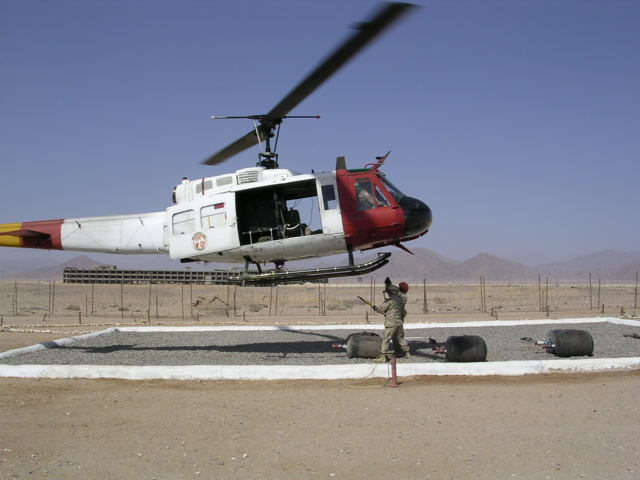
US Army Soldiers from 1/125 Infantry, Task Force Sinai, slingloading supplies 2004

Task Force Sinai is the US regiment-sized element of the Multinational Force and Observers ("MFO"), the peacekeeping organization in place in the Sinai Peninsula since 1982. The Task Force commander is a US Army colonel, who also serves as the MFO Chief of Staff. The Task Force commander utilizes American forces to support and achieve the overall observe and report mission of the MFO.

== History ==
TFS was created in March 1982.

== Organization ==
The Task Force is made up of the following units:

- Task Force headquarters staff, a company-sized element composed mostly of senior staff officers and NCOs who not only fill roles on the Task Force staff, but also serve in significant roles on the MFO Force Commander's staff.
- USBATT, an American infantry battalion from the US which rotates roughly on an annual basis providing peacekeepers to man part of the Zone C sites in the USBATT sector.
- 1st Support Battalion (1SB) which was formerly a permanent unit but since 2007 also rotates some of its elements from US Army National Guard. Currently, an active duty company has resumed operations. The Medical Company, Aviation Company and Explosive Ordnance Disposal Detachment are composed of active duty soldiers, making the 1SB a unique multi-compo unit. The 1SB is responsible for all logistics requirements of the MFO as a whole. The Explosives Ordnance Disposal detachment, medical unit and Aviation Company are all administered by the Support Battalion.

== Decorations ==
- Army Superior Unit Award Streamer Embroidered 2008-2009
