= El Gorah =

- locale
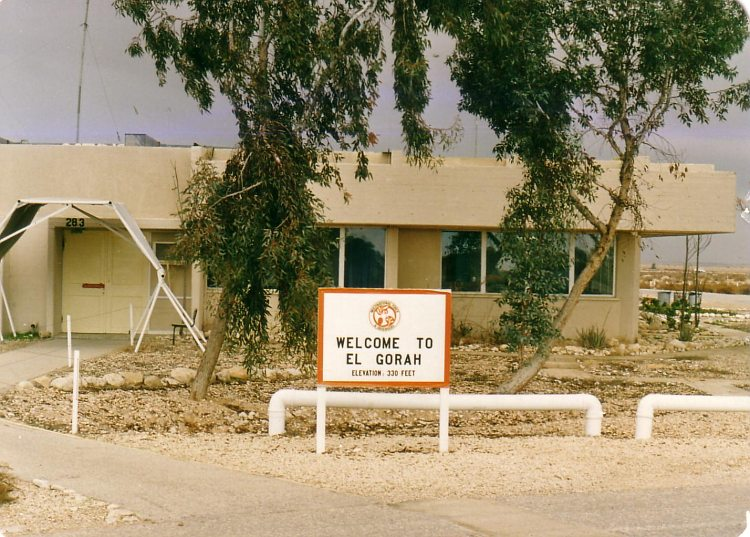
- Welcome to El Gorah - The MFO Canadian Rotary Wing Aviation Unit HQ, 1989

- Location within Egypt
- Coordinates: 31.08°N 34.14°E
- Country: Egypt
- Region: Sinai

El Gorah is a locale in northeastern Sinai, in Egypt, approximately 16 kilometers from the Israeli border and 37 km southeast of El Arish. The area is sparsely populated by nomads and by farmers who tend small orchards.

El Gorah is the location of former Israeli Air Force Base Eitam (named after the biblical station Etham), built during the Israeli occupation of the northern Sinai from 1967 to 1979. It is currently the location of the headquarters of the Multinational Force and Observers (MFO) international peacekeeping force, called MFO North Camp.

== See also ==
- Multinational Force and Observers
