= Multinational Force and Observers =

Peacekeeping force

- MFO Flag
- Founded: August 3, 1981
- Countries: See Contributing states
- Allegiance: peacekeeping force backed by Egypt, Israel, and the United States
- Type: Multinational force
- Role: Combined operations
- Nickname: MFO
- Website: http://mfo.org/en

Commanders
- Current commander: Major General Michael Garraway (AUS)

The Multinational Force and Observers (MFO) is an international peacekeeping force overseeing the terms of the peace treaty between Egypt and Israel. The MFO generally operates in and around the Sinai peninsula, ensuring free navigation through the Straits of Tiran and the Gulf of Aqaba, and compliance with the other terms of the Egypt–Israel peace treaty.

== Background ==
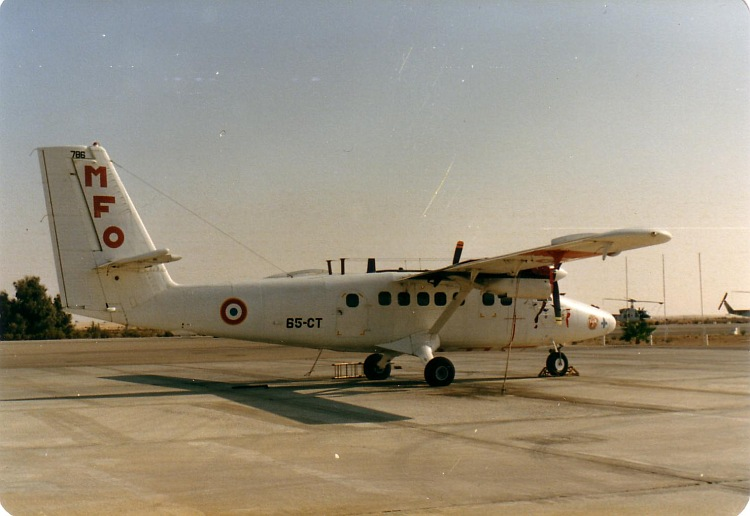
French Air Force Twin Otter on the El Gorah Flight Line in 1989

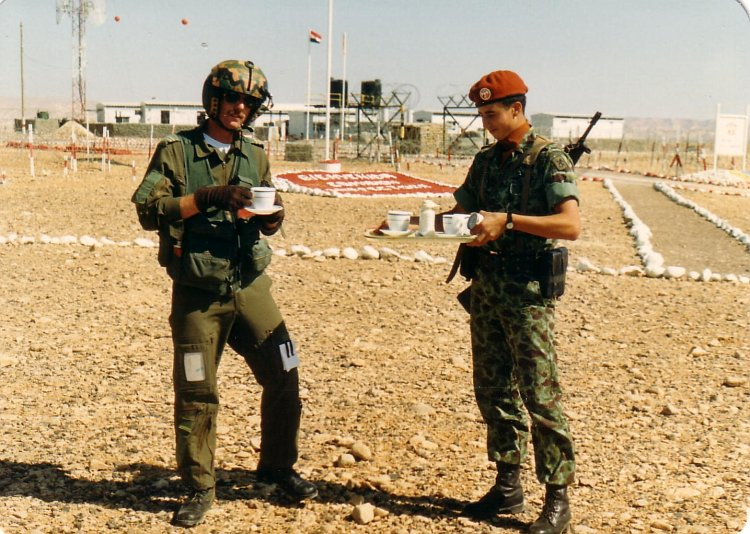
A Colombian soldier hosts a Canadian helicopter pilot in 1989. The Colombian is wearing the distinctive terracotta - colored beret that is unique to the MFO.

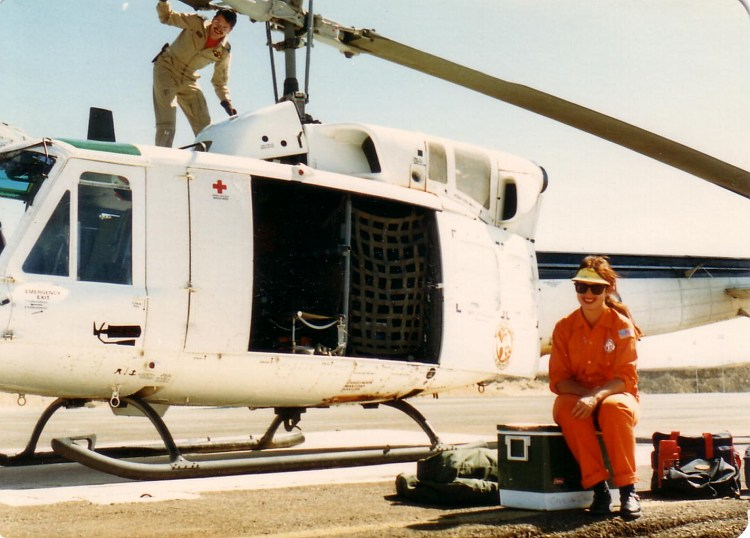
Canadian CH135 Twin Huey helicopter and an MFO Observer wearing the distinctive orange uniform used in 1989

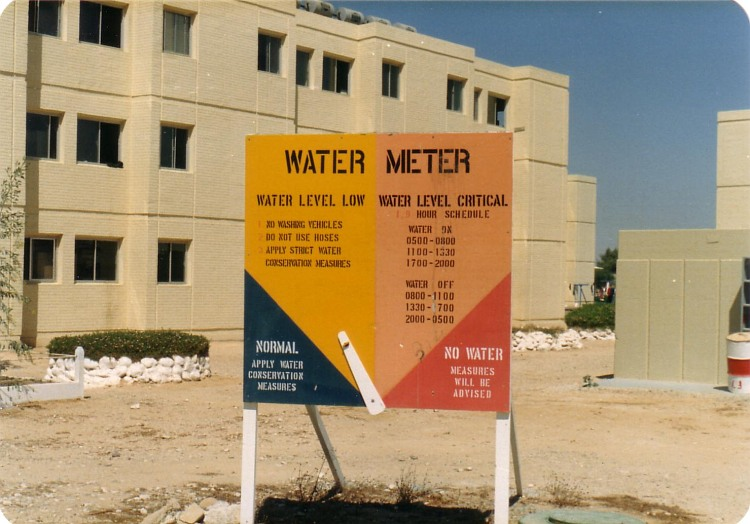
MFO water meter and Fijian barracks. Water is always in short supply in the Sinai

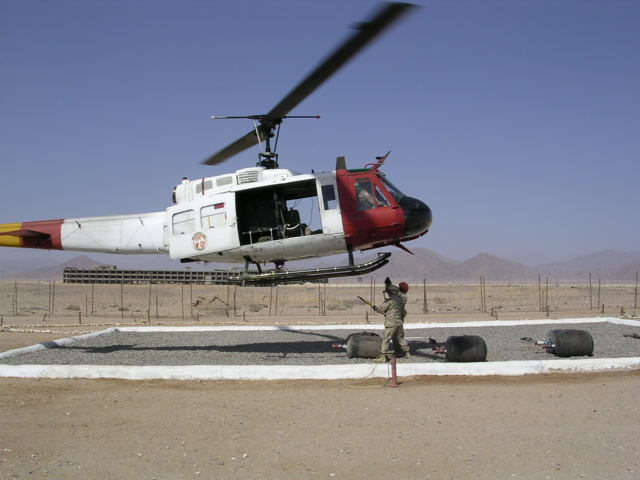
US Army soldiers from 1-125 Infantry slingloading supplies in 2004

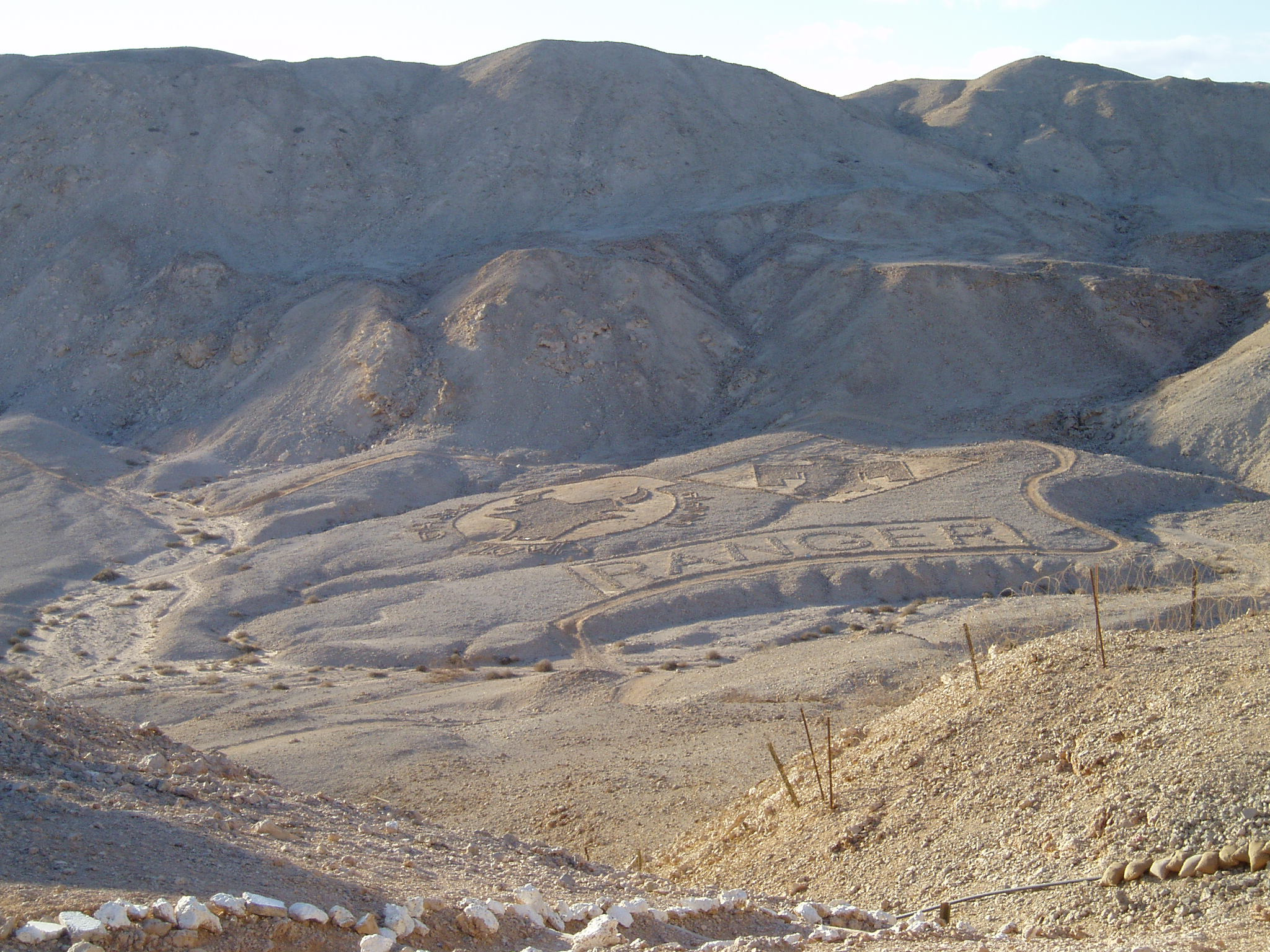
Physical training track at OP (observation point) 3-11 on Tiran Island in the Red Sea. The island is surrounded by functional and non functional land mines.

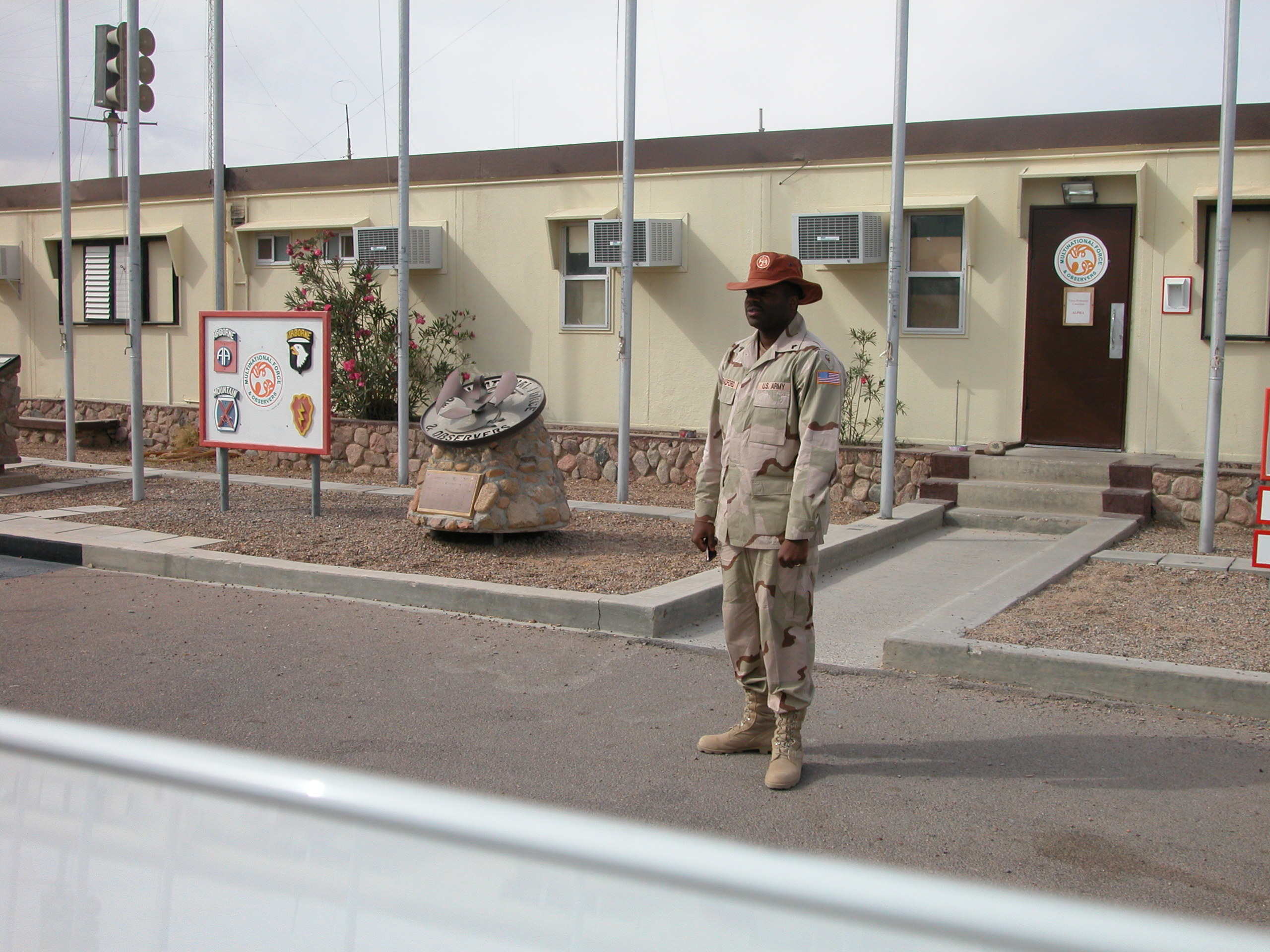
A USBATT MFO soldier wearing the authorized orange stetson hat identifying him as an MFO peace keeper in front of South Camp's USBATT Headquarters in Sharm El Sheikh.

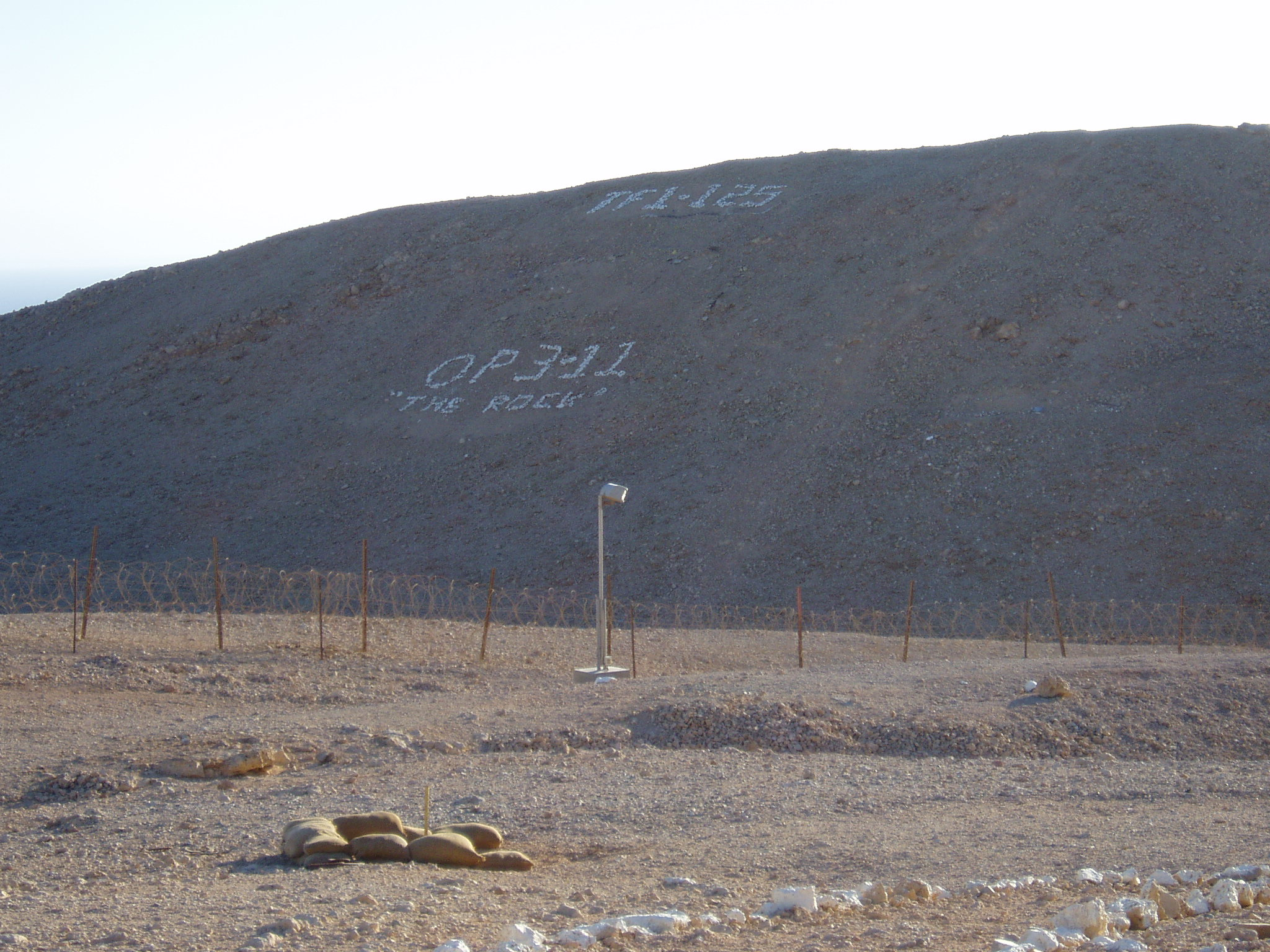
A hill outside the landing zone on Tiran (OP 3-11) island. MFO soldiers nicknamed OP 3-11 "The Rock" after the 1996 US prison movie due to its supposedly similar qualities.

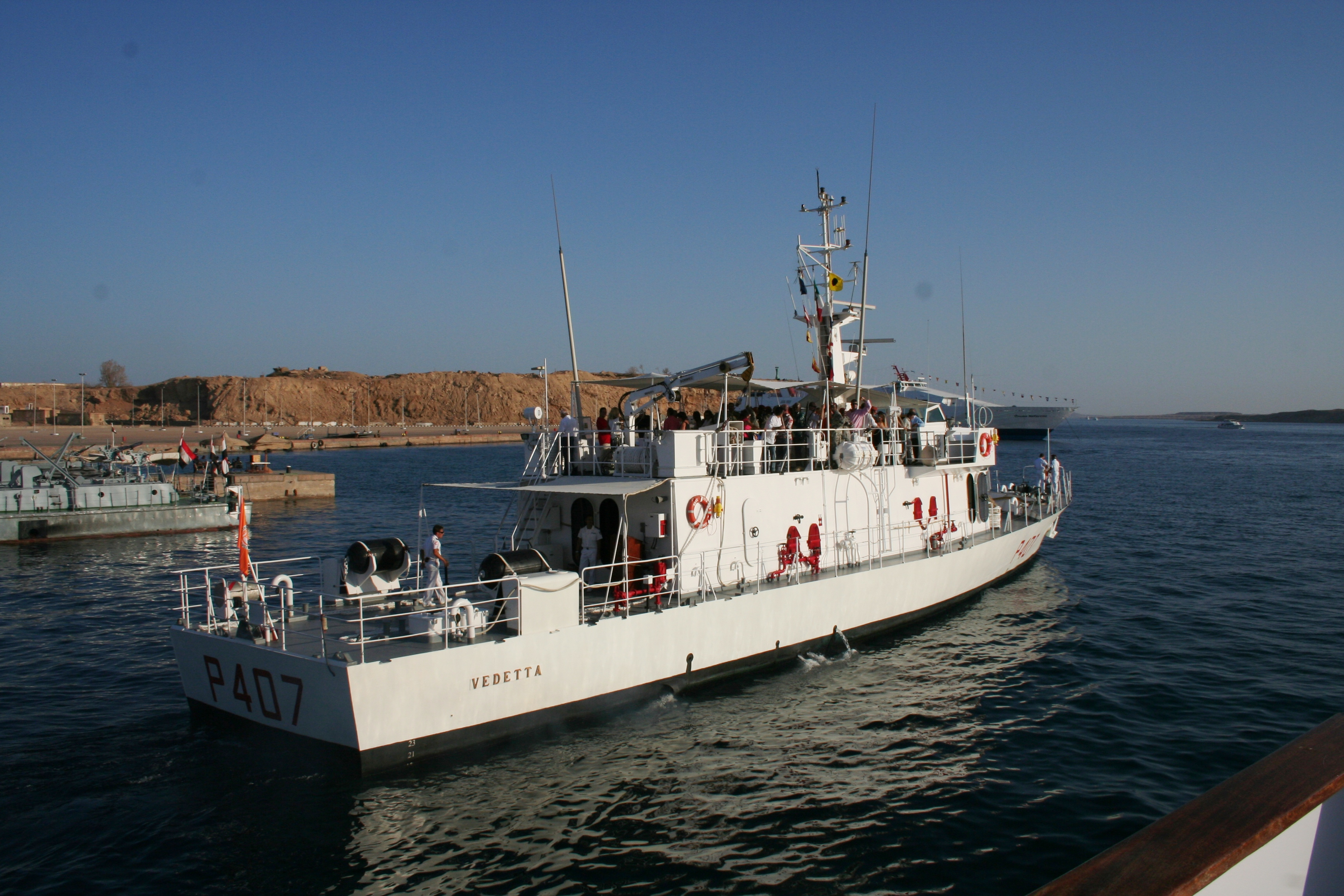
The Italian patrol boat Vedetta, an Esploratore-class patrol boat. The ships of the Coastal Patrol Unit serve as mobile observation posts within the Gulf of Aqaba.

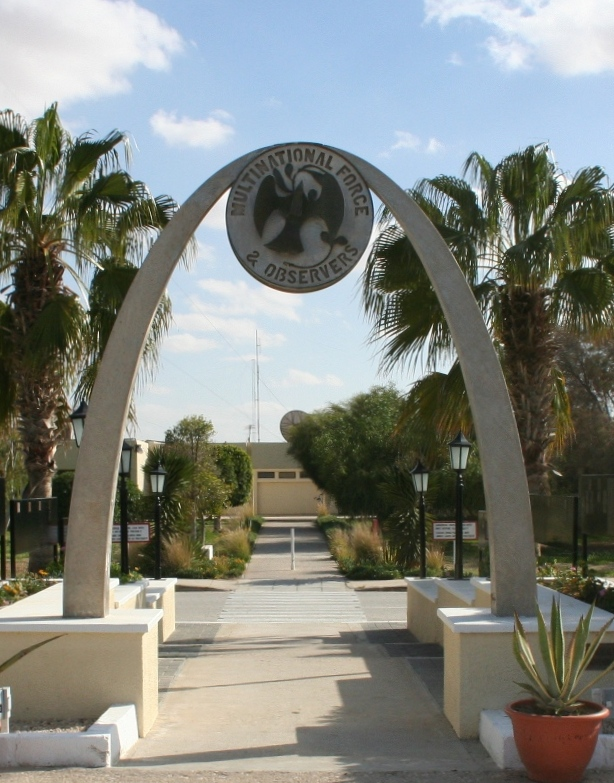
The Memorial Arch. Built near the Force Headquarters at North Camp the Arch includes plaques with the names of all peacekeepers who have died while serving in the MFO.

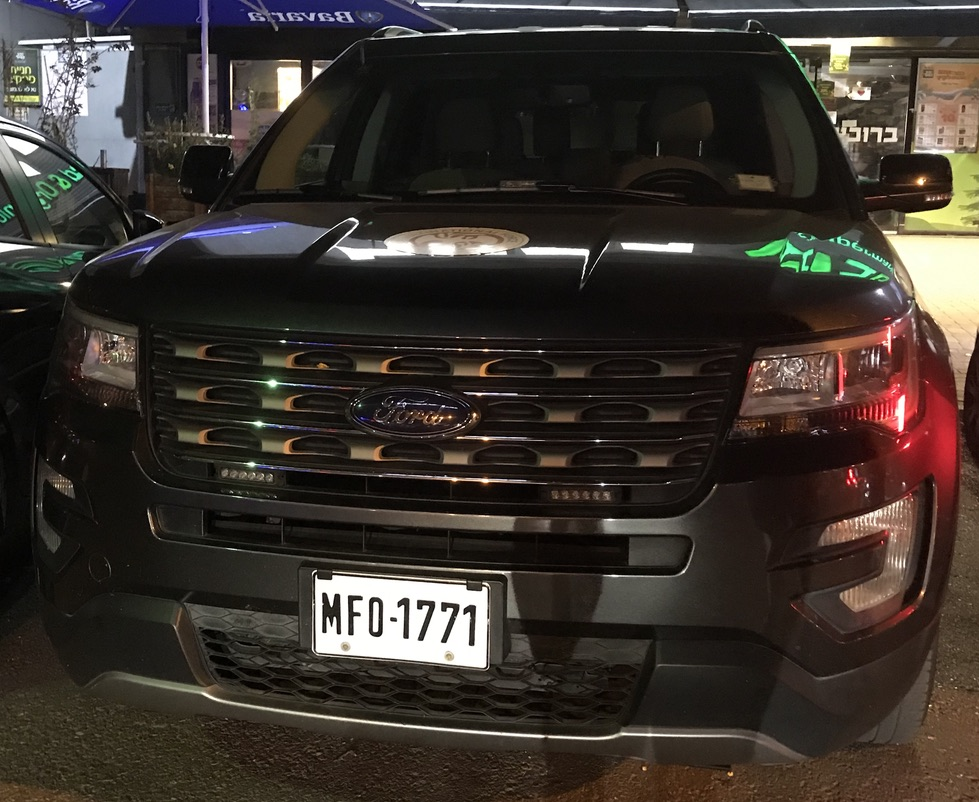
A car with an Israeli MFO license plate.

On September 17, 1978, the Camp David Accords were signed by Israeli Prime Minister Menachem Begin and Egyptian President Anwar Sadat under the sponsorship of United States President Jimmy Carter. The accords provided for a full Israeli withdrawal from Sinai.

Following the signing of the Egypt–Israel peace treaty on March 26, 1979, the United Nations was asked to provide the peacekeeping forces for the Sinai Peninsula mandated in the treaty. The terms of the treaty required the presence of international peacekeepers to ensure that both Israel and Egypt kept to the provisions regarding military build-up along the border.

Initially, the peacekeeping force was provided by the U.S. Sinai Field Mission, while efforts were made to create a UN force.

On May 18, 1981, the President of the UN Security Council indicated that the UN would be unable to provide the force, due to the threat of a veto of the motion by the USSR at the request of Syria.

As a result of the UN Security Council impasse, Egypt, Israel and the United States opened negotiations to set up a peacekeeping organization outside the framework of the UN. On August 3, 1981, the Protocol to the Treaty of Peace was signed, establishing the Multinational Force and Observers.

From 2012 to 2016, the MFO's North Camp was under threat from Islamic State of Iraq and the Levant – Sinai Province attacks and also "experienced periods of water and fuel shortages, and a near-total cut-off of internet access and mobile and landline phones during persistent Egyptian military operations." By September 2016, the MFO's northern camp was reorganized, with duties not related to observer responsibilities allocated to the south. 75 US soldiers were deployed with new communications equipment to bolster the MFO's manpower. The camps are reinforced with smart fences, more surveillance cameras and optics.

== Mission ==
The mission of the MFO is:

"... to supervise the implementation of the security provisions of the Egyptian–Israeli Treaty of Peace and employ best efforts to prevent any violation of its terms."

This is accomplished by carrying out four tasks:

- Operating checkpoints and observation posts and conducting reconnaissance patrols of the international border and Zone C,
- Verifying not less than twice a month that the terms of the peace treaty are being implemented,
- Verifying peace treaty compliance within 48 hours of a request by either party,
- Ensuring freedom of international marine navigation in the Strait of Tiran and access to the Gulf of Aqaba

Over the four decades that the MFO has carried out its mission, it has proven a highly successful force. The desire for peace on the part of both Egypt and Israel, combined with the effectiveness of the MFO, has resulted in a durable and lasting state of peace between these two nations.

== Organization ==
The MFO has its main headquarters in Rome, where it is headed by the Director-General. It also has two regional offices, in Tel Aviv and Cairo, while the Force itself is based in Zone C on the Sinai Peninsula, under the command of the Force Commander.

The Force Commander is responsible for the military elements of the MFO, which comprise:

- Headquarters
- Three infantry battalions (FIJIBATT, COLBATT and USBATT)
- 1st US Support Battalion (Formerly the Logistical Support Unit)
- Coastal Patrol Unit (CPU)
- Rotary Wing Aviation Unit (AVCO)
- Fixed Wing Aviation Unit (FWAU)
- Transport and Engineering Unit (TREU)
- Military Police Unit (FMPU)
- Flight Following (Air Traffic control) Unit

The Observer contingent of the MFO is made up entirely of US civilians. The observers are either seconded from the US State Department or retired US military personnel.

== Contributing states ==
As of October 2025, 14 states are contributing troops.

State	Strength
Albania	3
Australia	29
Canada	39
Colombia	275
Czech Republic	17
Fiji	170
Italy	78
Japan	4
New Zealand	28
Norway	3
Serbia	10
United Kingdom	2
United States (Task Force Sinai)	465
Uruguay	41
Total troops:	1,165

=== Former ===
- France: Withdrew contingent in 2024.
- Hungary: Withdrew contingent in 2015 due to financial concerns.
- Netherlands: Withdrew contingent in 1995. Withdrew again in 2015.

== Chronology ==
April 1983

Colonel Sitiveni Rabuka was appointed as Commanding Officer of the Fijian MFO contingent. After serving a two-year posting in the Sinai Colonel Rabuka returned to Fiji in 1985 to plan and stage a bloodless military coup which toppled the elected Fijian government on 14 May 1987.

February 1984

MFO Director-General Leamon Hunt was assassinated in Rome, Italy, while sitting in his chauffeur-driven armored car, outside the gates of his private residence. The assassins poured automatic weapon fire into the reinforced rear window until they were able to penetrate the glass and strike the director-general in the head. Responsibility for the assassination was claimed by Lebanese Armed Revolutionary Faction and the Red Brigade.

March 1985

Due to the imminent end of the four-year Australian MFO commitment in April 1986, the governments of Israel, Egypt, and the United States invited Canada to provide a contingent. Canada agreed to replace Australia in the MFO and to supply a helicopter squadron, staff officers and a flight-following section of air traffic controllers totalling 136 military personnel. The Canadian Contingent (CCMFO), operating under Operation Calumet, was brought on strength of the Canadian Forces on September 26, 1985.

December 1985

On December 12, 1985, a chartered Arrow Air DC-8 with 248 returning members of the U.S. 101st Airborne Division and eight flight crew crashed into the cold, damp landscape at the end of runway 22 at Gander International Airport in Gander, Newfoundland, with no survivors. The 101st was rotating home from a tour of duty with the MFO. The accepted theory is that the crash was caused by ice accumulation on the leading surfaces of the wings, but debate and speculation still rages that the crash may have resulted from some type of incendiary device placed on the plane.

April 1986

The Australian contingent, consisting of staff officers and a helicopter squadron who were members of the initial deployment, withdrew in the course of their government's reduction of its peacekeeping commitments. They were replaced by the CCMFO Canadian Rotary Wing Aviation Unit, equipped with nine CH135 Twin Hueys, staff officers and flight following. The CCMFO was operational at El Gorah on March 31, 1986. Canadian tactical helicopter units rotated to El Gorah for six-month tours of duty. The primary units providing military personnel were 408, 427 and 430 Tactical Helicopter Squadrons and 403 Squadron Helicopter Operational Training Squadron.

January 1993

The Australians, who had been replaced by a British contingent, returned to the mission, and the British contingent withdrew. Lieutenant Colonel Martin Hamilton-Smith was the first contingent commander of the returning Australians. He went on to become a South Australian politician after his military career.

August 1994

Australian MFO contingent members were involved in a hit-and-run accident that they failed to report. The incident came to light when one of the vehicle passengers, army Staff Sergeant David Hartshorn, reported it after he had been returned to Australia. Prima facie evidence of the incident was established and included in a formal inquiry by the Australian government in 2004. In an article by News Limited Network journalist Ian McPhedran on 30 August 2012, former Staff Sergeant David Hartshorn has received an apology from former Australian Army Chief Lieutenant General David Morrison and Inspector General of the Australian Defence Force Mr Geoff Earley for being ordered not to report the hit and run accident.

January 2002

The 2nd Battalion, 153rd Infantry Regiment of the Arkansas National Guard become the first National Guard unit to deploy to Task Force Sinai as part of Operation Noble Eagle. They relieved the 2-87th Infantry of the 10th Mountain Division based at Fort Drum, NY.

May 2007

A French Air Force de Havilland Canada DHC-6 Twin Otter aircraft on duty with the MFO Fixed Wing Aviation Unit crashed in the middle of the peninsula, 80 kilometres (50 mi) south of the town of Nakhl. All passengers and crew were serving members of the MFO, eight French and one Canadian, and all were killed. The aircraft reported trouble with one engine and was attempting an emergency landing on a highway when it struck a truck. It crashed and exploded moments later. The driver of the truck escaped unharmed.

September 2012

Dozens of armed militants attacked North Camp on Friday 14 September 2012, breaking down a wall of the facility housing the MFO headquarters, setting fire to vehicles and facilities. MFO soldiers defended the base and there was an exchange of fire. Four MFO members were reportedly wounded.

October 2013

Parts of the MFO view cutbacks of the military aid from United States to Egypt as negative for the stability in Sinai, as the military government had hit militants hard.

March 2014

MFO held a swearing-in ceremony to welcome the new Force Commander of MFO, Major-General Denis Thompson of Canada, formerly the Commander of CANSOFCOM.

March 2015

The Canadian contingent added 30 Canadian military police officers as part of the MFO Military Police Unit. This commitment lasted four years, until March 2019.

April 2015

The Hungarian contingent withdrew from the Sinai, wrapping up their 20-year mission.

February 2016

9 Parachute Squadron RE of the British Army deployed from February to April 2016 under Operation Branta. The Engineer Squadron improved the force protection infrastructure of the camp, including the construction of 16km of defensive walls.

March 2017

Australian Major General Simon Stuart assumes command of the MFO, replacing Major-General Denis Thompson from Canada.

February 2019

A visit was made to the MFO by Kentaro Sonoura, Special Advisor to Japanese Prime Minister Abe, as part of considering contributing JSDF personnel to the MFO.

March 2019

The Canadian contingent completed four years of support with the Military Police Unit, including commending that unit. The Canadian commitment switched to providing 55 Canadian Forces personnel as senior advisors, headquarters staff, as well as experts in remote observation, logistics support, military engineering, policing and training.

April 2019

The JSDF has dispatched personnel to the MFO.

November 2020

Seven MFO members (five U.S., one Czech, and one French) died in an MFO UH-60 Black Hawk helicopter crash near Sharm El Sheikh. An American peacekeeper was wounded in the crash and evacuated by Israeli search and rescue soldiers from Air Force Unit 669 to Soroka Medical Center in Beersheba, Israel.

December 2022

Albanian troops are deployed to participate in the MFO.

July 2023

Tokyo extends mission in the MFO with four JGSDF officers working until 2024.

July 2023

Serbia deploys an engineering unit to the MFO.

== Sinai peacekeeping zones ==
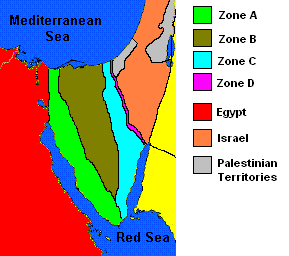
The Sinai Peninsula

Article 2 of Annex I of the Peace Treaty called for the Sinai Peninsula to be divided into zones. Within these zones, Egypt and Israel were permitted varying degrees of military buildup:

- Zone A: Between the Suez Canal and Line A. Egypt is permitted a mechanized infantry division with a total of 22,000 troops in Zone A.
- Zone B: Between Line A and Line B. Egypt is permitted four border security battalions to support the civilian police in Zone B.
- Zone C: Between Line B and the Egypt–Israel border. Only the MFO and the Egyptian civilian police are permitted within Zone C, except for a coastal strip along the border of the Gaza Strip (the so-called Philadelphi Corridor, which is the Gaza part of Zone D) corresponding to a rectangle of approximately 14 kilometers wide by 20 kilometers along the Mediterranean. In this area, a designated force of Egyptian Border Guards is present pursuant to an agreement between Egypt and Israel in September 2005, before the withdrawal of Israel from the Gaza Strip on 12 September 2005, in which Egypt was tasked with the border patrol of the area.
- Zone D: Between the Egypt–Israel border and Line D. Israel is permitted four infantry battalions in Zone D.

Within Zone C there are two main installations:

- North Camp is at El Gorah, 37 km southeast of El Arish and is the location of the military Force HQ.
- South Camp is located between the towns of Sharm El Sheikh and Naama Bay.

In addition there are thirty smaller sites at various points within Zone C. One remote observation post (OP 3-11) is located offshore on Tiran Island, requiring resupply by air or sea.

=== Zone C ===
Zone C is subdivided into sectors, each controlled by a Sector Control Center. The sectors are numbered from north to south, with an infantry battalion assigned to a pair of consecutively numbered sectors:

- Sectors 1 and 2 – FijiBatt
- Sectors 3 and 4 – ColBatt
- Sectors 5 and 7 – USBatt (The 3 original sectors were reorganized into 2 sectors)

== Badges ==
Badge worn by members of the Canadian Contingent Rotary Wing Aviation Unit 1989–90

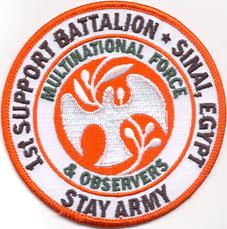
Souvenir patch for members of the 1st Support Battalion.

== Life in the Sinai ==
Maintaining a good quality of life for MFO members in the Sinai is difficult, due to the remoteness and desolation of the region as well as more recent security concerns. Gym facilities, clubs, medical facilities, libraries and exchanges are provided at both North Camp and South Camp. In addition, North Camp possesses a pool while South Camp boasts Herb's Beach, a section of the Red Sea coastline where it is possible to snorkel just a few feet into the water and see a variety of tropical fish.

The Force has its own magazine, the bimonthly and bilingual Sandpaper. Published in English and Spanish, it is produced by the Press and Visits Office. Sporting events are held at both camps. Members are encouraged to take visits to Israel and Egypt, usually in organized trips. There are also trips to Mount Sinai, Luxor, Cairo, Jerusalem, and other sites within Egypt and Israel. A television and radio system also service North Camp and South Camp.

There are venues for live shows at both camps and the U.S. organization Armed Forces Entertainment provides a variety of bands, dancers and other acts to keep the troops entertained.

At remote observation sites, which might house only a dozen peacekeepers, the quality of life is harder to maintain. During tours at remote sites peacekeepers have limited access to the internet, are provided with workout equipment, and are permitted to have pets. Pets are not allowed at the main camps, even though a veterinarian is available to maintain the health of the animals, which are almost always dogs.

After the original inception of the MFO, routine travel to al-Arish, Sharm El Sheikh and a beach facility near the Gaza Strip were restful getaways but recent security concerns over possible Hamas activity has changed that. Similarly, a bicycle competition known as the Tour de Sinai which had begun in 1985 had gone by the wayside in recent years.

== Force Commanders ==
No.	Name	Nationality	From	To
1	Lieutenant General Frederick Bull-Hansen	Norway	1982	1984
2	Lieutenant General Egil Ingebrigsten	Norway	1984	March 1989
3	Lieutenant General Donald McIver	New Zealand	March 1989	March 1991
4	Lieutenant General J.W.C. van Ginkel	Netherlands	11 April 1991	21 April 1994
5	Major General David Ferguson	Australia	21 April 1994	10 April 1997
6	Major General Tryggve Tellefsen	Norway	1997	March 2001
7	Major General Robert Meating	Canada	March 2001	March 2004
8	Major General Roberto Martinelli	Italy	March 2004	2007
9	Major General Kjell Ludvigsen	Norway	2007	March 2010
10	Major General Warren Whiting	New Zealand	March 2010	March 2014
11	Major General Denis Thompson	Canada	March 2014	1 March 2017
12	Major General Simon Stuart	Australia	1 March 2017	1 December 2019
13	Major General Evan Williams	New Zealand	1 December 2019	5 March 2023
14	Major General Pavel Kolář	Czech Republic	5 March 2023	25 September 2023
13*	Major General Evan Williams	New Zealand	25 September 2023	17 March 2024
15	Major General Michael Garraway	Australia	17 March 2024	Incumbent

== See also ==
- United Nations Emergency Force – the United Nations peacekeeping operation stationed in the Sinai after the Suez Crisis of 1956 to maintain the truce between Egypt and Israel
- List of non-UN peacekeeping missions
