= Joint Task Force Gold =

JTFGold Olympic logo

Joint Task Force (JTF) Gold was the Australian Defence Force unit formed to provide security and general support for the 2000 Summer Olympics and the 2000 Summer Paralympics which was held in Sydney, Australia. JTF Gold had a strength of over 4000 personnel drawn from all three services and was commanded by Brigadier Gary Byles. The JTF consisted of several unit sized elements, each responsible for specific security or general support.
