= Ian McPhedran =

Australian journalist and author (born 1957)

- Born: 1957 (age 68–69)
- Occupations: Journalist, author
- Spouse: Verona Burgess

Ian McPhedran (born 1957) is an Australian author and retired journalist. Having begun his journalism career at The Canberra Times, from 1998 he worked as a defence writer for the News Corp Australia mastheads, including the Herald Sun, The Daily Telegraph and Northern Territory News, before announcing his retirement in January 2016. HarperCollins has published eight books by McPhedran, who won a Walkley Award in 1999.

== Career ==
Prior to 1998, McPhedran was foreign affairs and defence writer for The Canberra Times. Between 1998 and 2016 he worked as a defence writer News Corp Australia, writing for publications including the Herald Sun, The Daily Telegraph and Northern Territory News, before announcing his retirement in January 2016.

At the beginning of the Iraq War in 2003, McPhedran reported on the war from Baghdad, staying at the Meridien Palestine Hotel. McPhedran was expelled from the country by the Iraqi Government soon after ABC photojournalist Paul Moran was killed by a suicide car bomber in northeastern Iraq on 23 October 2003. McPhedran reported that Iraqi officials had accused him of not following regulations when he left his hotel to visit the Information Ministry building without a minder.

McPhedran's first book, The Amazing SAS, was published by HarperCollins in 2005. Michelle Grattan's review in The Age criticised McPhedran for offering the 'official account' of an incident in Afghanistan in which innocent people died after being mistaken for insurgents. She suggested that further discussion and analysis was needed of the incident, but overall she praised McPhedran's remarkable access.

In 2009 McPhedran was invited by the Australian Defence Force to take part in an "embedding trial". McPhedran suggested the ADF's model should rather be called 'media hosting' and he was sometimes frustrated by a lack of access and time wasting during the trial.

== Family and personal life ==
McPhedran, the oldest son born to his Anglo-Burmese refugee father, Colin McPhedran, and Australian mother, was raised in Bowral, in the Southern Highlands of New South Wales.

McPhedran is married to journalist Verona Burgess. They live in Balmain, Sydney.

White Butterflies, a book written by Ian McPhedran's father Colin with editing assistance from Verona Burgess, tells the story of Colin's journey on foot from Burma to India during World War II to escape the Japanese invasion of Burma. Colin, then 11 years old, embarked on the journey with his mother and two siblings but only he survived.

== Awards ==
- 1993 award for the news reporting section in the United Nations Association Media Peace Awards
- 1999 Walkley Award for best news reporting
- 2015 Aviation Online Contribution of the Year

== Works ==
- The Amazing SAS: The inside story of Australia's special forces. HarperCollins. 2005. ISBN 9780732279813.
- Soldiers Without Borders: Beyond the SAS: a global network of brothers-in-arms. HarperCollins. 2008. ISBN 9780732285555.
- Air Force: Inside the new era of Australian air power. HarperCollins. 2011. ISBN 9780732290252.
- Too Bold to Die: the making of Australian war heroes. HarperCollins. 2013. ISBN 9781743097632.
- Afghanistan: Australia's War. HarperCollins. 2014. ISBN 9780732299132.
- The Smack Track: Inside the Navy's war: chasing down drug smugglers, pirates and terrorists. Harper Collins. 2017. ISBN 9781460752920.
- The Mighty Krait: The little boat that pulled off Australia's most daring commando raid of WWII. HarperCollins. 2018. ISBN 9781460709801.
- Where Soldiers Lie: The Quest to Find Australia's Missing War Dead. HarperCollins. 2019. ISBN 9781460755655.
