= List of Australian of the Year for Western Australia award recipients =

The Australian of the Year award is an award given annually in Australia on Australia Day (also commonly known as Invasion Day). The award is also given at the state and territory level.

The following is a list of recipients of the Australian of the Year award for Western Australia.

== Recipients ==
Year	Name	Reason for receiving award
2004	Prof. Fiona Wood AO FAHMS	Treating victims of severe burns following the 2002 Bali bombings and pioneering the spray-on skin technique.
2005	Prof. Fiona Wood AO FAHMS	Treating victims of severe burns following the 2002 Bali bombings and pioneering the spray-on skin technique. She was also the overall Australian of the Year for 2005.
2006	Prof. Geoffrey Bolton AO FASSA FAHA	Contributions to academics as an historian, socio-political commentator and writer.
2007	Prof. Barry Marshall; Prof. Robin Warren	Discovery that the cause of gastritis and peptic ulcer disease is a bacteria (Helicobacter pylori); achievement of the 2005 Nobel Prize in Physiology or Medicine.
2008	Mark Bin Bakar	Contributions to the arts; increasing cultural understanding and raising awareness of issues facing Indigenous peoples.
2009	Dr. Penny Flett	Contributions to geriatric medicine; service with the Royal Australian Air Force (RAAF), including being the first woman doctor to serve in the RAAF.
2010	Prof. Ralph Martins	Research into Alzheimer's disease, including the discovery that beta amyloid protein plaque is the foundation of Alzhemier's, and that brains affected by Alzheimer's experience oxidative stress.
2011	Malcolm McCusker AC RVO KC	Contributions to justice as the most senior practicing Queen's Counsel (lawyer) in Western Australia; philanthropy in donating over $20 million and many volunteer hours to over 100 organisations.
2012	Prof. Donna Cross	Contributions to children's health and advocacy for children.
2013	Kerry Stokes AC	Philanthropic contributions, including preserving Australia's military heritage and donating several Victoria Cross medals to the Australian War Memorial.
2014	Prof. Bruce Robinson AM	Contributions to reseach of asbestos-related cancers, including the first blood test for mesothelioma and establishing clinics.
2015	Prof. Lyn Beazley AO	Over 30 years of contributions to neuroscience, especially in recovery from brain injury and changing clinical practice for the treatment of premature infants.
2016	Anne Carey	Providing healthcare to remote communities in Papua New Guinea and Australia, and working with the Australian Red Cross in Kenya, Sudan and Sierra Leone, including during the Ebola outbreak.
2017	Andrew Forrest AO	Philathropic contributions to around 250 causes, especially in decreasing inequality for Indigenous Australians and liberating people in modern slavery globally.
2018	Dr. Tracy Westerman AM	Contributions to psychology for Indigenous children and young adults.
2019	Dr. Craig Challen SC OAM PBh (GCT)	Heroism in the Tham Luang cave rescue; he was part of the team of cave divers who rescued 12 boys and their coach from a flooded cave in Chiang Rai, Thailand.
2020	Annie Fogarty AM	Founding the Fogarty Foundation (alongside her husband, Brett) to advance education for young people.
2021	Prof. Helen Milroy	Being the first Indigenous Australian to become a medical doctor, and her pioneering research, education and training on Aboriginal and child mental health.
2022	Paul Litherland OAM	Contributions to cyber safety for young people, teachers and parents.
2023	Prof. Samar Aoun	Being a researcher and advocate for end-of-life care and grief support, especially for underserved communities such as those with motor neurone disease, dementia, the terminally ill and family carers.
2024	Mechelle Turvey OAM	Advocating for victims of crime and training police in supporting victims, following the murder of Cassius Turvey, her 15-year-old son who was killed in 2022.
2025	Diane Haggerty; Ian Haggerty	Restoring landscape ecology through agriculture and founding Natural Intelligence Farming (NIF).
2026	Dr. Daniela Vecchio	Digital addiction and gaming disorder specialist.
2027	Esther Oh	Founding Agili8, a healthcare technology startup.

== See also ==
- List of New South Wales Australian of the Year award recipients
- List of Queensland Australian of the Year award recipients
- List of South Australian of the Year Award recipients
- List of Senior Australian of the Year Award recipients
- List of Young Australian of the Year Award recipients
- List of Australian Local Hero Award recipients
