= List of Queensland Australian of the Year award recipients =

The Queensland Australian of the Year Award is given annually on Australia Day. The announcement of the award has become a major public event in Australia, and is televised nationwide. The award "offers an insight into Australian identity, reflecting the nation's evolving relationship with world, the role of sport in Australian culture, the impact of multiculturalism, and the special status of Australia's Indigenous people".

The national level awards, four in total, are chosen exclusively from the state and territory award recipients.

The following is a list of the recipients of the Queensland Australian of the Year award.

== Recipients ==
Year	Name	Post nominals	Born	Died	Notability
2004	Steve Irwin		1962	2006	Conservationist, environmentalist, and television presenter
2005	Bill Bristow			2025	Aviator and humanitarian
2006	Ian Frazer		1953		Immunologist and inventor of the HPV vaccine against cervical cancer
2007	David Conry				YoungCare founder
2008	Lee Kernaghan	OAM	1964		Country music singer-songwriter
2009	Bronwyn Sheehan				Literacy advocate
2010	Chris Sarra		1967		Indigenous educator
2011	Noel Hayman				Doctor
2012	Bruce and Denise Morcombe				Child protection advocates
2013	Adele Green	AC	1952		Cancer researcher
2014	Li Cunxin		1961		Ballet director
2015	Hetty Johnston	AM	1958		Child protection activist
2016	Catherine McGregor	AM	1956		Distinguished Royal Australian Air Force officer
2017	Alan Mackay-Sim		1951	2023	Biomedical scientist treating spinal cord injuries
2018	Johnathan Thurston	AM	1983		Rugby league footballer and Indigenous mentor
2019	Jon Rouse				Distinguished police officer specialising in child protection
2020	Rachel Downie				Educator and social entrepreneur
2021	Dinesh Palipana	OAM	1984		Advocate for doctors with disabilities
2022	Sue and Lloyd Clarke				Domestic violence advocates
2023	William Barton		1980 or 1981		Multi-instrumentalist, composer, producer, and vocalist
2024	Marco Renai				Men at Business founder
2025	Geoffrey Smith				Data analyst and Australian Spatial Analytics co-founder
2026	Rolf Gomes				Cardiologist
2027	Robert Irwin		2003		Conservationist, wildlife photographer, and television presenter

== See also ==
- List of Senior Australian of the Year Award recipients
- List of Young Australian of the Year Award recipients
- List of Australian Local Hero Award recipients
- List of South Australian of the Year Award recipients
- List of New South Wales Australian of the Year award recipients
