= List of New South Wales Australian of the Year award recipients =

The New South Wales Australian of the Year Award is given annually on Australia Day. The award "offers an insight into Australian identity, reflecting the nation's evolving relationship with world, the role of sport in Australian culture, the impact of multiculturalism, and the special status of Australia's Indigenous people".

The national level awards, four in total, are chosen exclusively from the state and territory award recipients.

The following is a list of the recipients of the New South Wales Australian of the Year award.

== Recipients ==
Year of award	Name	Post nominals	Born	Died	Comments
2004	Steve Waugh	AO	1965		Test Cricket Captain
2005	Nicole Kidman		1967		Actor & Producer
2006	The Hon. Michael Kirby	AC, CMG	1939		High court judge & human rights advocate
2007	Professor Tim Flannery		1956		Scientist, Writer and Thinker
2008	Stephen Page		1965		Pioneering choreographer
2009	Glenn McGrath	AM	1970		Cricketer and fundraiser
2010	John Dee				Environmental campaigner
2011	Larissa Behrendt		1969		Indigenous rights lawyer
2012	Father Chris Riley	AM			Charity founder
2013	Ita Buttrose	AO, OBE	1942		Media icon
2014	Adam Goodes		1980		AFL player and community leader
2015	Deborra-lee Furness		1955		Child advocate and adoption campaigner
2016	Elizabeth Broderick				Social change innovator
2017	Deng Adut				Child soldier turned successful Lawyer
2018	Professor Michelle Simmons	FRS, FAA, FRSN, FTSE	1967		Professor in quantum physics
2019	Professor Kurt Fearnley	AO	1981		Paralympian
2020	Professor Munjed Al Muderis		1972		Orthopaedic surgeon and human-rights advocate
2021	Commissioner Shane Fitzsimmons	AFSM	1969		Ex-NSW Fire Commissioner, leader of Resilience NSW

== See also ==
- List of Senior Australian of the Year Award recipients
- List of Young Australian of the Year Award recipients
- List of Australian Local Hero Award recipients
- List of South Australian of the Year Award recipients
- List of Queensland Australian of the Year award recipients
