= Mark Donaldson =

Recipient of the Victoria Cross

Mark Donaldson VC
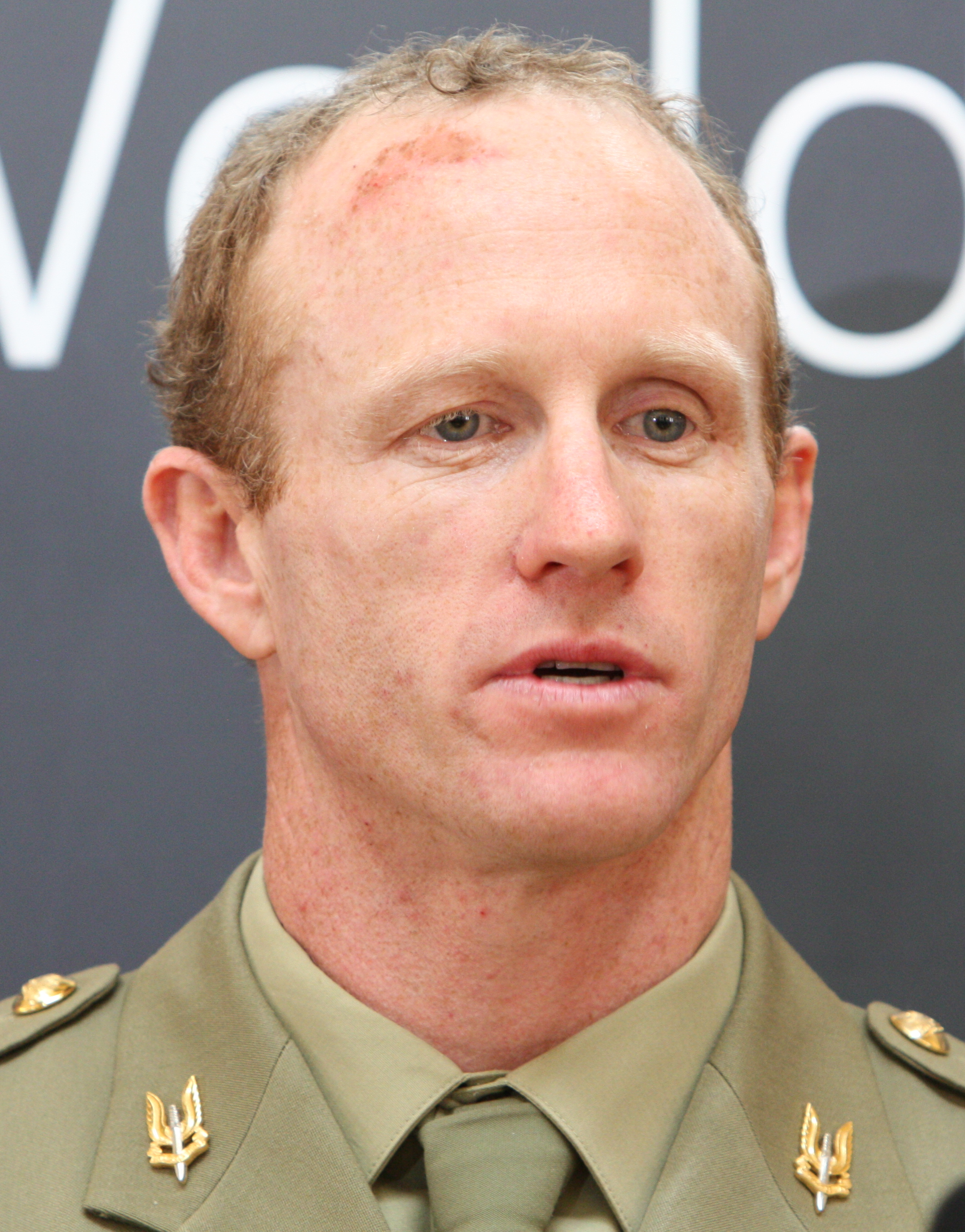
- Corporal Mark Donaldson in 2014
- Born: Mark Gregor Strang Donaldson; 2 April 1979 (age 47); Waratah, New South Wales
- Military career
- Allegiance: Australia
- Branch: Australian Army
- Service years: 2002–present
- Rank: Corporal
- Units: 1st Battalion, Royal Australian Regiment; Special Air Service Regiment
- Conflicts: East Timor; Iraq War; Operation Falconer; War in Afghanistan; Operation Slipper; Battle of Khaz Oruzgan
- Awards: Victoria Cross for Australia

Mark Gregor Strang Donaldson (born 2 April 1979) is an Australian soldier and a recipient of the Victoria Cross for Australia, the highest award in the Australian honours system. Then Trooper Donaldson was a member of the Special Air Service Regiment (SASR) when he exposed himself to enemy fire to protect injured troops and then rescued an interpreter under heavy enemy fire in the Battle of Khaz Oruzgan during Operation Slipper, the Australian contribution to the War in Afghanistan. He was presented with the decoration by the Governor-General of Australia, Quentin Bryce, in a ceremony in Canberra on 16 January 2009. On 25 January 2010, Donaldson was named the 2010 Young Australian of the Year. He was promoted to corporal in June 2010.

== Early life ==
Donaldson was born on 2 April 1979 in Waratah, New South Wales, the younger son of Greg, a Vietnam War veteran, and Bernadette Donaldson. He grew up in the small northern New South Wales township of Dorrigo, attending Dorrigo High School, a small state public school, until 1996. In 1995, his father died suddenly of a heart attack, and Mark and his brother became wards of Legacy, one of their legatees being a former member of the same Army unit their father had served in.

In 1998, when Donaldson was 19 and attending art college in Sydney, his mother disappeared. She is presumed murdered and an investigation into the disappearance is ongoing. Donaldson left full-time education and took a variety of physically demanding jobs in Australia and overseas.

== Military career ==
=== 2002–2008 ===
Donaldson enlisted in the Australian Army on 18 June 2002. He trained at Army Recruit Training Centre, Kapooka, winning prizes as the best shot and best at physical training in his platoon. Detailed to the Royal Australian Infantry Corps, he then underwent further training at Singleton, where he won prizes again for shooting and physical training, and also as most outstanding soldier in his platoon. He was then posted to the 1st Battalion, Royal Australian Regiment, based in Townsville, Queensland.

From February to April 2004, Donaldson completed the SASR selection course, and was posted to 3 Squadron in May 2004. He has since seen service in East Timor, Iraq (Operation Falconer) and Afghanistan (Operation Slipper). During his deployment to Afghanistan, he was slightly wounded on 12 August 2008 when the Bushmaster protected mobility vehicle he was travelling in struck an improvised explosive device.

=== Victoria Cross for Australia ===
Video of the investiture ceremony at Government House, Canberra, on 16 January 2009

The actions for which Donaldson's Victoria Cross for Australia were awarded took place on 2 September 2008. Patrolling with Afghan and US forces, they were ambushed by a well-prepared and larger Taliban force. The ambush began with sustained machine gun and rocket-propelled grenade fire, causing several casualties. Donaldson deliberately exposed himself to fire from the Taliban fighters in order to draw their attention away from the casualties, allowing them to be moved to cover. When the patrol attempted to withdraw, the number of casualties was such that the unwounded personnel (including Donaldson) had to make their way on foot, beside their vehicles, as the casualties filled the vehicles. As they set off, it was realised that an Afghan interpreter attached to the patrol was wounded and had not been loaded into the vehicles. Donaldson immediately crossed the 80 metres (87 yd) or so of open ground between the convoy and the interpreter, under heavy fire, and then carried him back to the vehicles where Donaldson administered first aid. The patrol eventually broke free of the ambush after two hours.

When asked about the incident, Donaldson commented: "I'm a soldier, I'm trained to fight ... it's instinct and it's natural. I just saw him there, I went over and got him, that was it." The events were first reported by the Australian press on 12 December 2008 following a briefing by Major General Tim McOwan on 11 December. At this stage, Donaldson was identified only as "Trooper F". Donaldson then became the first recipient of the Victoria Cross for Australia on 16 January 2009; he was presented with the medal by the Governor-General at a ceremony in Government House, Canberra.

The official citation was published in a special edition of the Commonwealth of Australia Gazette of 20 January 2009 and states (in part) that the award was made for " ... most conspicuous acts of gallantry in action in a circumstance of great peril in Afghanistan, as part of the Special Operations Task Group during Operations SLIPPER, Oruzgan province, Afghanistan." Seven days after the medal presentation, Donaldson lent his VC and other medals to the Australian War Memorial in an official ceremony. The medals were placed on display at the end of February 2009. Donaldson was subsequently received in audience by the Queen, Elizabeth II, at Windsor Castle on 10 November 2009.

=== Subsequent career ===
After being presented with his VC, Donaldson requested permission to remain a member of the SASR and participate in operational postings. This was approved by Chief of the Defence Force, Air Chief Marshal Angus Houston, and Chief of Army, Lieutenant General Ken Gillespie. Donaldson subsequently served in Afghanistan for a four-month period in 2009, made a brief deployment to the country in early 2010 and deployed again in 2013. He was also promoted to the rank of corporal in 2010 after completing a junior leaders course.

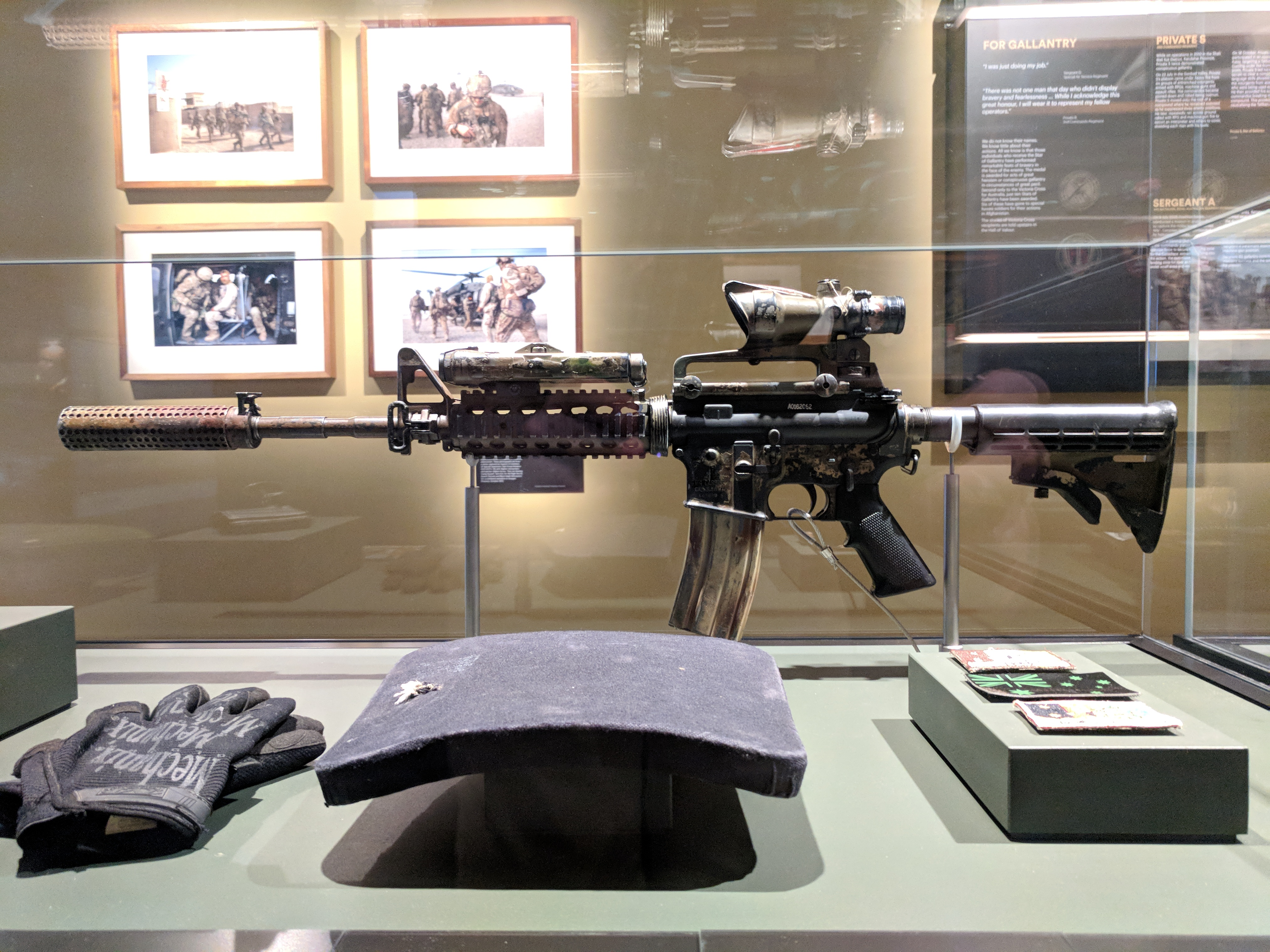
The M4 carbine used by Donaldson during the action for which he was awarded the Victoria Cross for Australia on display at the Australian War Memorial

On 11 November 2009, Donaldson and British VC recipient Johnson Beharry handed a wreath to the Queen during a service in Westminster Abbey which marked the deaths in 2009 of the last three veterans of the First World War resident in the United Kingdom, Bill Stone, Henry Allingham and Harry Patch. The wreath was then laid on the Tomb of the Unknown Warrior. While Donaldson was in London, news emerged in Afghanistan that Sarbi, an explosives detection dog that was declared missing in action after the 2 September ambush, had been found alive and well by an American soldier. Donaldson said of the news that it "closed a chapter in their shared history" and "She's the last piece of the puzzle ... Having Sarbi back gives some closure for the handler and the rest of us that served with her in 2008. It's a fantastic morale booster for the guys." Donaldson was announced as the Patron-in-Chief of the military charity Soldier on Australia on 4 October 2014.

In a May 2014 interview with the Australian Financial Review's Christopher Joye, Donaldson disclosed that he had been shot in the leg during a contact in Afghanistan: "This 35-year-old 'shooter' has also been clipped through his left hamstring, where a slug remains to remind him of why he should never have traversed a track while a Taliban carrying night-vision goggles zeroed in with an AK-47." He also spoke about killing terrorists: "Pressed on the burden of taking another life, he says that rubbing out bad guys in "gun fights" – a notably "more personal experience than dropping bombs from jets" – is just a "part of the job". Donaldson is at peace with a profession that few have the mental or physical equipment to pursue: "I don’t get nightmares, mate. Sure you remember stuff; I just don’t dwell on it."

== Personal life ==
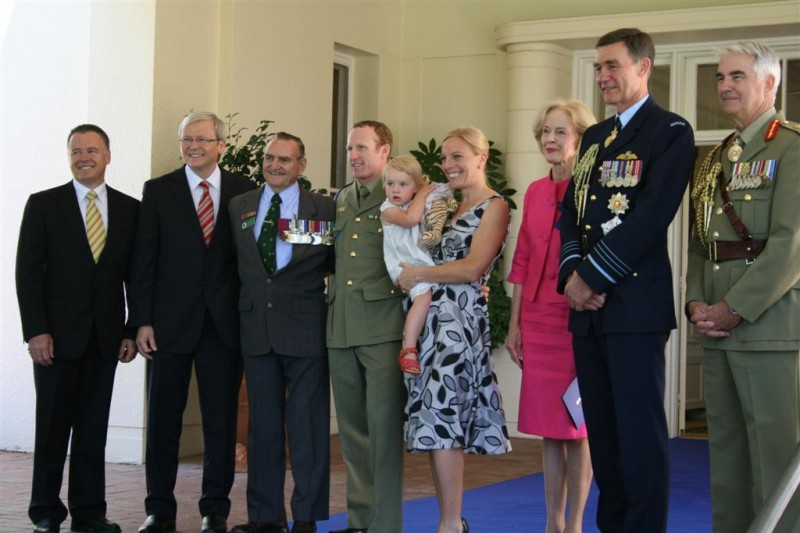
Donaldson with family (centre) and other dignitaries after the investiture ceremony.

Donaldson is married to Emma, and has a daughter and a son. He has written a memoir called The Crossroad, which was published by Macmillan in 2013. Emma had described him as being "married to the army". Donaldson says of himself: "I don't see myself as a hero, honestly. I still see myself as a soldier first and foremost."

== Honours and awards ==
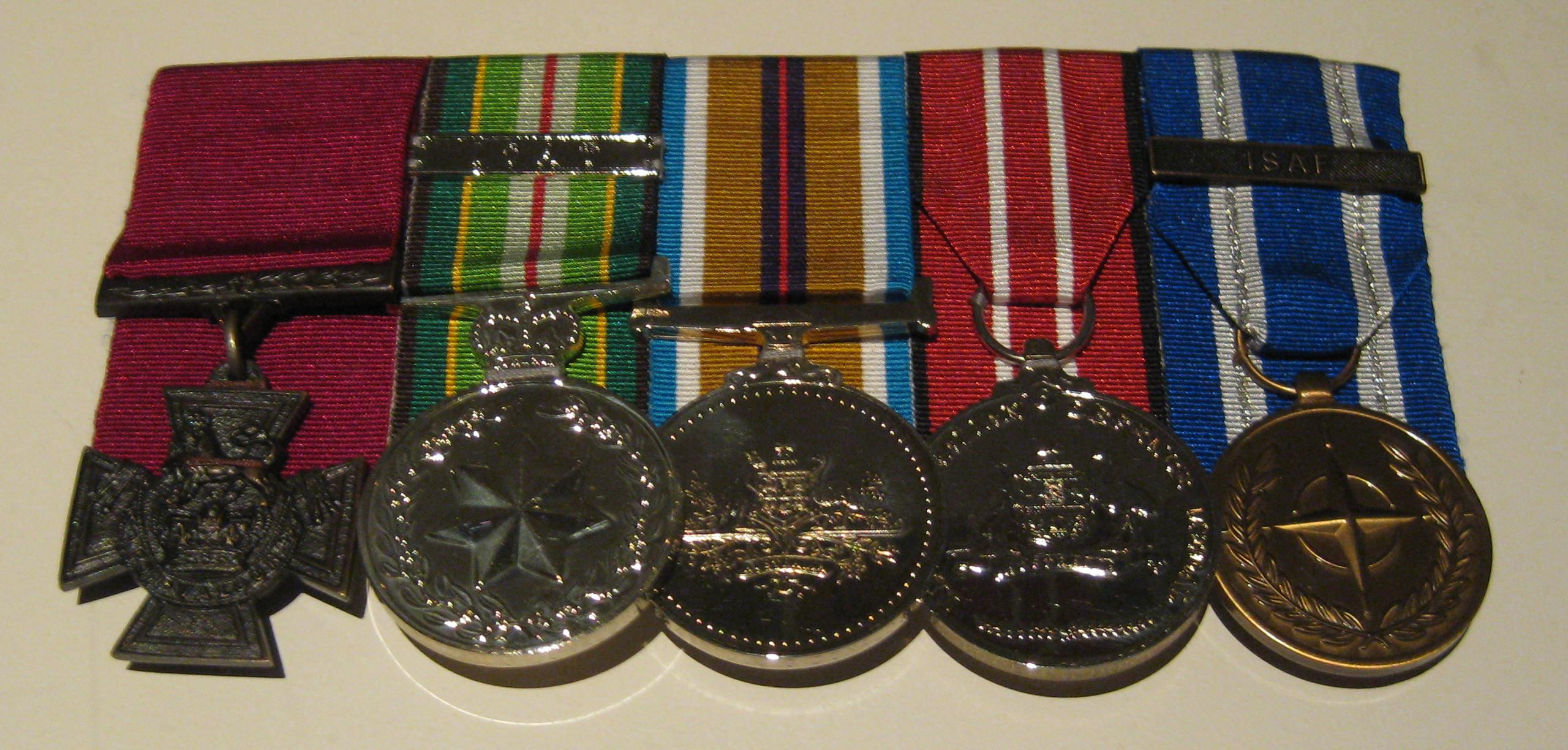
Donaldson's medals on display at the Australian War Memorial in March 2009

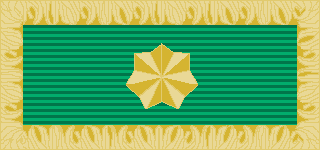
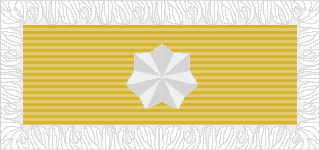

Ribbon	Description	Notes
Ribbon of the Victoria Cross for Australia	Victoria Cross for Australia (VC)	2009
Ribbon of the AASM	Australian Active Service Medal	with ICAT clasp
Ribbon of the Afghanistan Medal for Australia	Afghanistan Medal	
Ribbon of the ASM	Australian Service Medal	
Ribbon of the Queen Elizabeth II Diamond Jubilee Medal	Queen Elizabeth II Diamond Jubilee Medal	2012
Ribbon of the Queen Elizabeth II Platinum Jubilee Medal	Queen Elizabeth II Platinum Jubilee Medal	2022
Ribbon of the Queen Elizabeth II Platinum Jubilee Medal	King Charles III Coronation Medal	2023
Ribbon of the Defence Long Service Medal	Defence Long Service Medal	for 15–19 years service
Ribbon of the ADM	Australian Defence Medal	
	NATO Medal for the Non-Article 5 ISAF Operation in Afghanistan	with clasp ISAF
Ribbon of the Unit Citation for Gallantry	Unit Citation for Gallantry with Federation Star	Awarded to Special Air Service Regiment for extraordinary acts of gallantry in Afghanistan, from 25 August 2005 to 2 September 2006, in support of the security and stabilisation operations in Afghanistan and the International Coalition against Terrorism.
Meritorious Unit Citation	Meritorious Unit Citation with Federation Star	Awarded to Task Force 66 in the 2015 Australia Day Honours
	Infantry Combat Badge	

On 25 January 2010, Donaldson was named the Young Australian of the Year 2010. That evening, at a public event on the lawns of Parliament House in Canberra, the Prime Minister (Kevin Rudd) and the National Australia Day Council Chair (Adam Gilchrist) presented Donaldson with a handmade glass award and praised his achievements.

Awards
Preceded by Jonty Bush	Young Australian of the Year; 2010	Succeeded by Jessica Watson
