= Esther Oh =

Singaporean-Australian telehealth innovator

- Born: 1976 or 1977 (age 49–50); Singapore
- Education: University of Western Australia
- Known for: Founder of Agili8
- Children: 2

Esther Oh is a Singaporean-Australian Telehealth innovator known for founding Agili8 and being the 2027 Australian of the Year for Western Australia.

== Biography ==
Oh was born in Singapore around 1976 or 1977. She has two children. In 2009, Oh moved to Perth on a skilled migrant visa, as she wanted to raise her sons in Western Australia.

Oh attended the University of Western Australia, where she earned her Master's degree in commercial and resources law. Around 2021, Oh was battling an aggressive form of cancer.

== Career ==
Oh's son lost his eyesight in 2020, then aged 16. His medical care had been delayed because of the COVID-19 lockdown in effect at the time. The experience led Oh to found Agili8, a company which develops artificial intelligence technology and X-ray-based software to be used in smart glasses and on smart phones. This AI-based healthcare technology can then be used by frontline healthcare workers to connect with medical specialists in other places, which allows specialised healthcare to be provided in remote locations. Oh worked with people in remote Aboriginal communities to develop a culturally safe model of care for workers using the technology.

Oh's work has received awards and recognition. In a challenge launched by the government of Western Australia in 2023 to find solutions to improving healthcare in the Pilbara region, Agili8 was one of 10 finalists out of 100 contestants from around the world. Agili8 was also named the Most Innovative Startup of the Year for 2024 by the Startup Daily Best-in-Tech Awards.

Oh is also the managing director of AusAsia Resources, a consultancy firm for trade between Asia and Australia. She has served on numerous boards and committees, including those of the Governing Council of Challenger Institute of Technology, Edith Cowan University, Curtin University, Lateral Capital Ventures, CITIC Pacific Mining and SMI Paper in Indonesia.

== Awards ==
In 2016, Oh was named one of BusinessNews' 40 Under 40. In 2021, her company Agili8 won an AusIndustry Business Innovation Award in the category of cybersecurity technology. She also received recognition by Women in Technology Western Australia.

In 2026, Oh was the inaugural recipient of the TARA award, which celebrates first-generation migrant business owners in Australia. She also received the 2027 Australian of the Year award for Western Australia for the creation of Agili8.
