= Isobel Marshall =

Australian social entrepreneur and medical student

Isobel Marshall (born 1998) is an Australian social entrepreneur and medical student who was named Young Australian of the Year for 2021.

== Early life ==
Marshall is from Adelaide's inner southern suburbs. She attended Walford Anglican School for Girls and is studying a MBBS at the University of Adelaide.

== Notable work ==
Marshall was 18 years old when she and Eloise Hall founded TABOO in 2017, a social enterprise to help women fight the stigma of menstruation, motivated by a trip to Kenya where she saw young girls who had dropped out of education due to menstruation. They crowdfunded $56,000, launching a range of ethical and organic menstrual hygiene products in 2019, with all profits going to African charity One Girl. They also partner with St Vincent de Paul Women's Crisis Centre to provide free pads and tampons to women in emergency accommodation in South Australia and with the Ngaanyatjarra, Pitjantjatjara and Yankunytjatjara Women's Council. Marshall and Hall direct and manage the company, as well as visiting schools to educate students about the cause.

== Award ==
Marshall was named Young Australian of the Year on 25 January 2021, alongside three other women: Australian of the Year Grace Tame, Senior Australian of the Year Miriam-Rose Ungunmerr-Baumann, and Local Hero Rosemary Kariuki. In her speech upon receiving the award, Marshall said "Periods should not be a barrier to education. They should not cause shame ... Let's all commit to fighting period poverty around the world."
