= Gordian Fulde =

Australian medical doctor (born 1948)

Gordian Fulde AO
- Born: Gordian Ward Oskar Fulde; October 3, 1948 (age 78); Engen, Germany
- Education: University of Sydney
- Occupation: Doctor
- Years active: 1971–present
- Employer: St. Vincent's Hospital, Sydney
- Television: Kings Cross ER: St Vincent's Hospital
- Spouse: Lesley Forster
- Children: 2
- Parents: Edwald Adolf Oskar Fulde (father); Marie Luise Fulde (mother)
- Awards: Senior Australian of the Year (2016)
- Medical career
- Field: Emergency Medicine
- Institutions: St. Vincent's Hospital, Sydney

Gordian Ward Fulde AO (born 1948) is an Australian emergency medicine specialist, the founder of the Australasian College for Emergency Medicine, and was the director of the emergency department of St Vincent's Hospital in Sydney for 35 years, retiring in 2018. He was named Senior Australian of the Year in 2016.

== Early life ==
Fulde was born in Germany in 1948 to Edwald Adolf Oskar Fulde, a thoracic surgeon, and Marie Luise Fulde, a pathologist. He migrated to Australia with his parents and older brother, Lothar, when he was one year old, settling in Bellevue Hill, a suburb in Sydney's east.

== Career ==
Fulde studied medicine at the University of Sydney and completed his internship at St Vincent's Hospital. He trained in general surgery, but after taking up a position at Sutherland Hospital that involved supervising the hospital's emergency department, he discovered that he preferred emergency medicine to surgery. He was the third person to register for the examinations in emergency medicine established by the Royal College of Emergency Medicine in the United Kingdom in 1983, and the first person to pass them. He founded the Australasian College for Emergency Medicine in 1984.

Fulde was appointed the Director of Emergency at St Vincent's Hospital in 1983 and held the role until his retirement in 2018; at which time he was the longest-serving director of an Australian emergency department. St Vincent's Hospital is regarded as having one of the busiest emergency departments in Australia and was the setting of reality television series Kings Cross ER, in which Fulde featured prominently. He was also the director of the Sydney Hospital emergency department and a professor of emergency medicine at the University of New South Wales and the University of Notre Dame Australia. He was a strong proponent of the Sydney lockout laws introduced in 2014 to combat alcohol-induced violence.

Fulde was named Senior Australian of the Year in 2016.

Fulde was made an Officer of the Order of Australia in 2017 for "distinguished service to emergency medicine as a clinician and administrator, to medical education, and to the community as an advocate for a range of public health issues."

== Personal life ==
Fulde met his wife (Susan) Lesley Forster when she was studying medicine at UNSW (MB BS '75). Lesley Forster trained as a Fellow of the Royal Australasian College of Medical Administrators and Public Health, having served as the Director of Medical Administration at St Vincent's and having established the NSW Trauma System and Retrieval Services and the Delineation of Roles in Hospitals, and served as the Head of the UNSW Rural Clinical School. She is the inaugural Dean of Rural Medicine of Charles Sturt University. Their daughters, Sascha and Tiffany Fulde, are also doctors; the former is an emergency specialist and the latter is an anaesthetist.
