= Battle of Khaz Oruzgan =

2008 battle of the Afghanistan War

Battle of Khas Oruzgan
- Part of the War in Afghanistan (2001–2021)
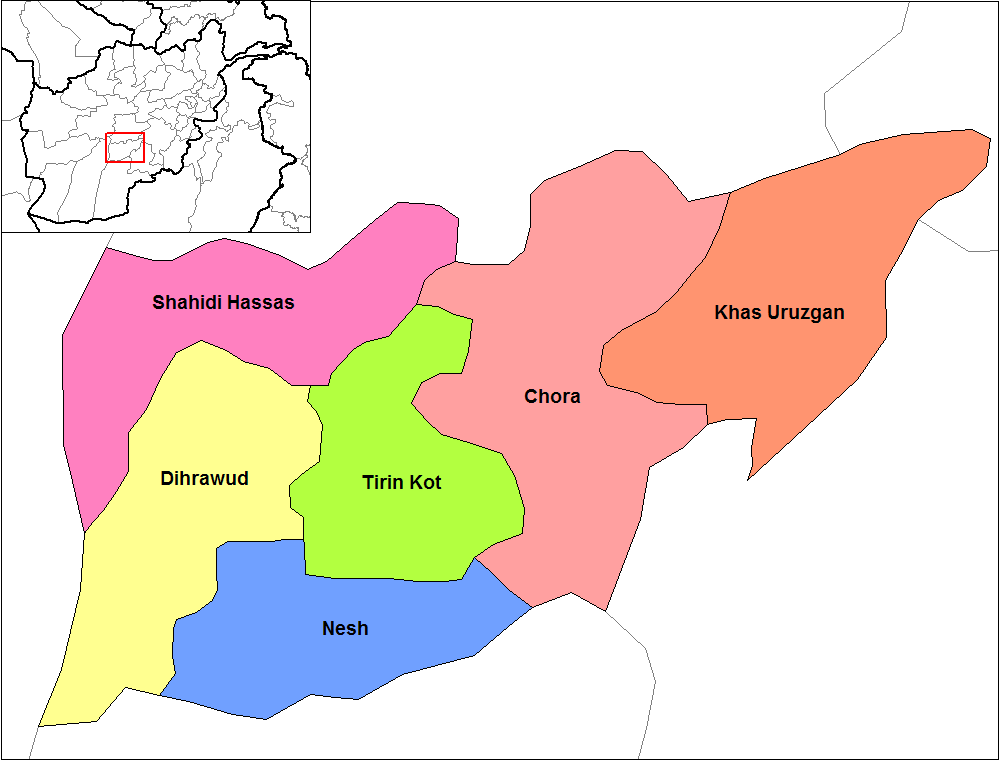
- Map showing Khas Uruzgan district in Oruzgan province where the battle took place near the village of Khaz Oruzgan
Date	2 September 2008
Location	Khaz Oruzgan, northern Oruzgan Province, Afghanistan
Result	Taliban victory

Belligerents
United States; Australia; Afghanistan; Netherlands (indirect role)	(Afghanistan) Taliban

Commanders and leaders
(United States) Unknown (Australia) Troy Simmonds; Unknown	(Afghanistan) Unknown

Strength
Five armoured Humvees; Combined patrol consisted of 37 soldiers	Between 100–200 Taliban fighters

Casualties and losses
(United States) 1 American killed and 1 wounded (Australia) 9 Australians wounded Sarbi missing (trained dog); 1+ Afghan wounded	Between 20–80 (estimated)
- None

The Battle of Khas Oruzgan (2 September 2008) occurred when a combined Australian, American, and Afghan patrol was ambushed by up to 200 Taliban fighters near the village of Khaz Oruzgan. The infamous battle was one of the most intense for Australian forces since the Vietnam War at the time.

== Background ==
In late August at the American FOB Anaconda, a combined operation of Australians and Americans began the first patrol to "flush out the bad guys". The Australians managed to spot a party of three Taliban who were possibly organising fighters to hit the Americans who were some distance away. After the Taliban crossed the 'killing ground' where there would be no real cover for them to hide behind, the Australian snipers proceeded to engage and neutralise all three targets.

American intelligence soon revealed further Taliban were coming in order to collect the dead. The Americans then changed their positions so they could observe up the valley. Right after the Taliban had stopped their vehicle, the Americans sent a volley of 40 mm grenades destroying the vehicle and its six occupants. It was later revealed that one of the Taliban inside was the eastern commander of the Taliban in that area.

The ANA soldiers then proceeded to pilfer their AKs, ammunition and their webbing, and anything else of importance. An American medic treated one of the wounded Taliban and was soon released after questioning. They thought it was best to let him go to see what would develop from the coalition ambush.

On the return to Anaconda, the patrol was ambushed by a handful of fighters with small enemy fire. The patrol was broadside onto the enemy and the green zone, and to the right was a large steep feature. With only one way to go the patrol turned all guns towards the enemy fire and threw everything they had. Eventually, the American JTAC called in two F/A-18 Hornets and provided two 20mm cannon runs into Taliban positions. On the first patrol a total of 11 had been killed that day.

After an overnight rest, they began to gear up for the next operation the following day. Little did they know that it would turn into one of the biggest battles involving Australian troops since Vietnam.

== Battle ==
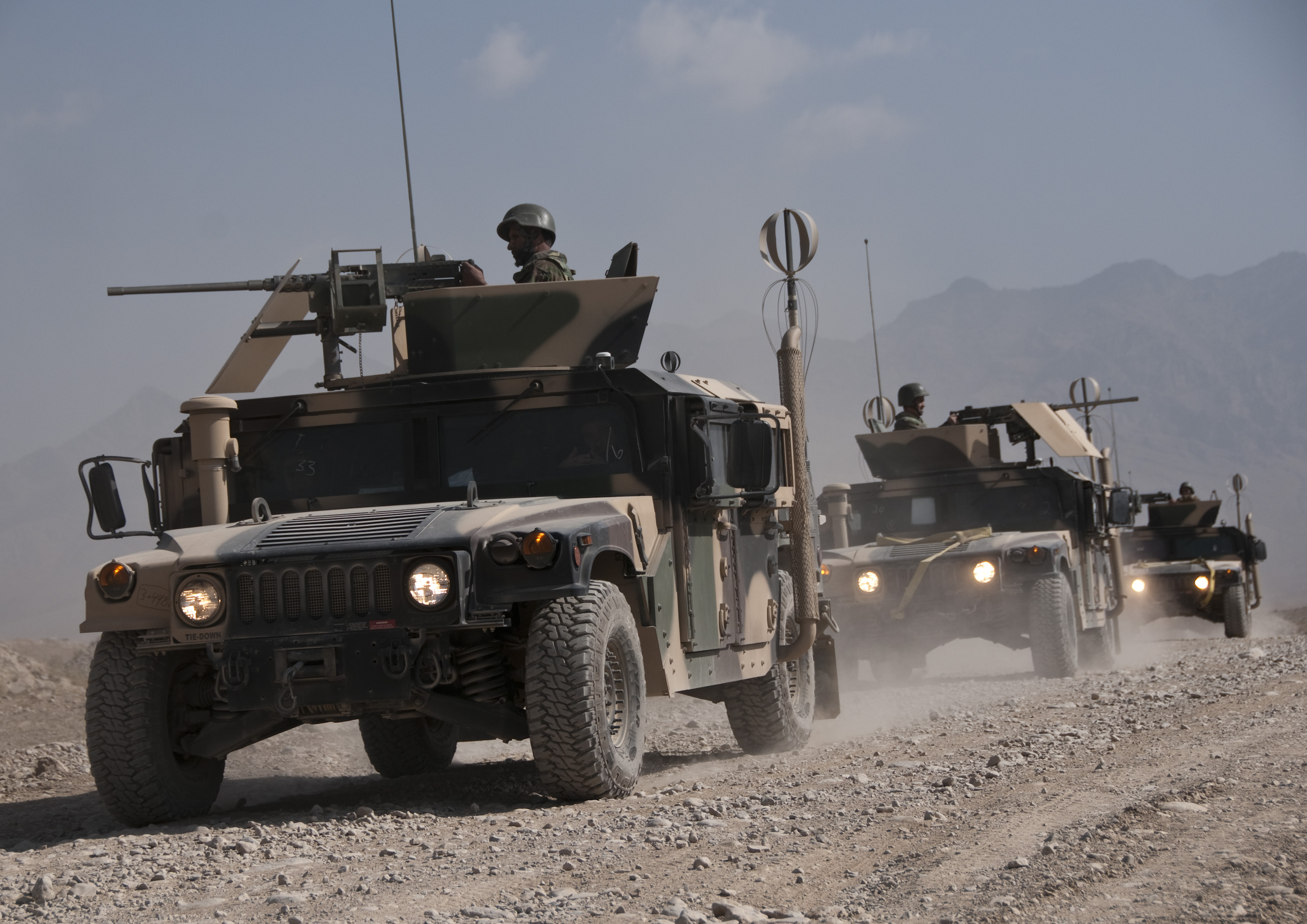
A combined humvee convoy performing a routine clearance patrol exercise

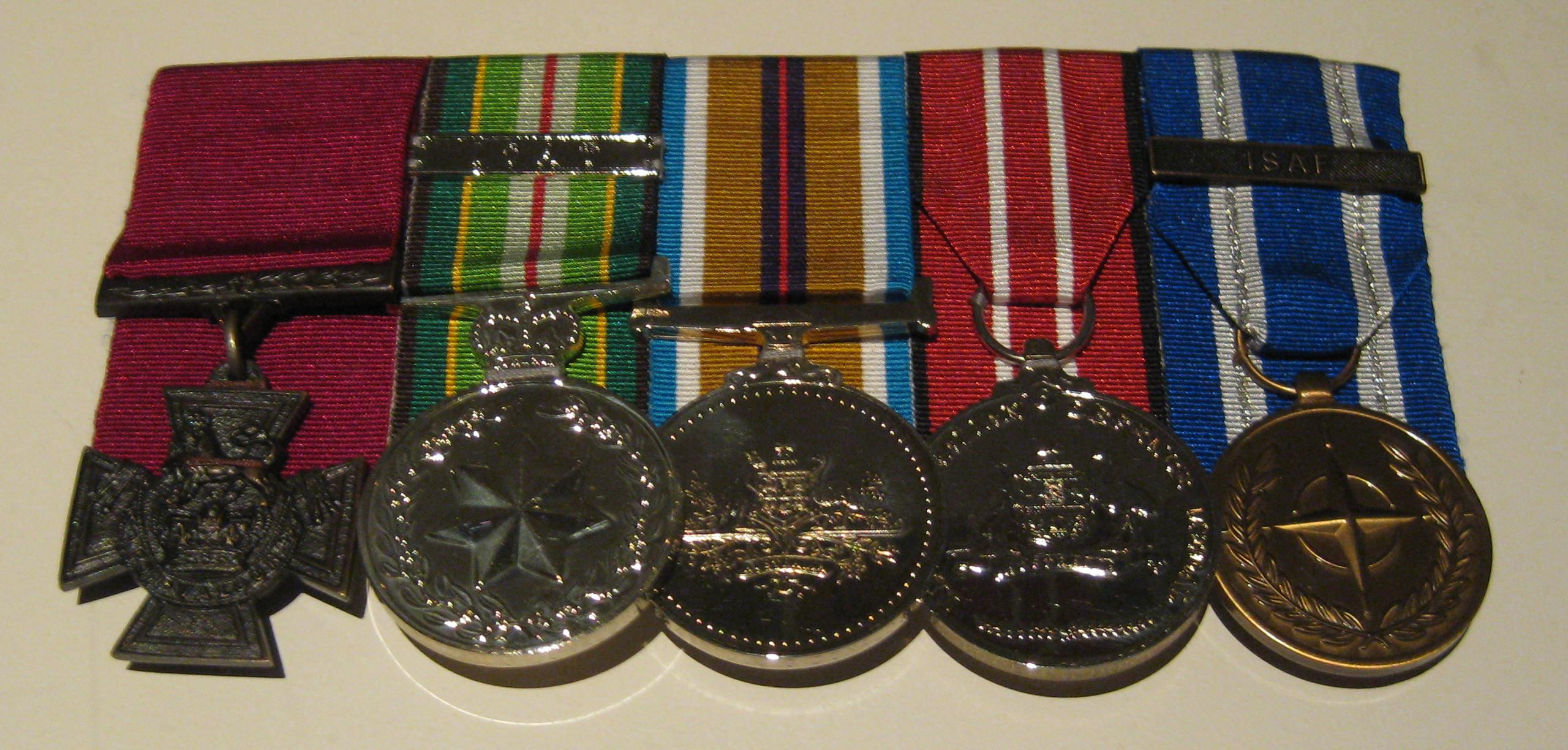
Trooper Mark Donaldson's medals on display at the Australian War Memorial in Canberra. From left to right they are the Victoria Cross for Australia, Australian Active Service Medal with ICAT clasp, Afghanistan Medal, Australian Defence Medal and NATO Medal for the Non-Article 5 ISAF Operation in Afghanistan.

The battle took place on 2 September 2008.

After the success of a joint US-Australian ambush mission in the valley to the northeast of FOB Anaconda, the coalition force conducted a similar ambush mission in another valley to the east near a village called Ana Kalay. The mission commenced with two SASR patrols and a command element moving by foot in darkness to establish themselves in ambush positions to the north of the Ana Kalay valley.

At 4 am five Humvees crewed by US Special forces of the 7th SF group and Afghan Special forces troops departed FOB Anaconda and made their way east into the Ana Kalay valley.

The US/Afghan force was accompanied by the remaining two SAS patrols, two Australian SF Engineers from the Incident Response regiment and the Explosive detection dog, Sarbi. The SASR troopers joined the vehicle group to provide additional fire power for the move into the valley. The vehicle move could not be conducted under the cover of darkness, due to the Afghan SF troops not being issued with night vision equipment. The Afghan troops manned the first and last vehicles in the five Humvee convoy. Deep into the valley, both SASR patrols left the vehicles and moved into the foothills to establish themselves in southerly ambush locations. The SASR patrols were equipped with long range sniper rifles. With the ambush set, the five vehicles moved around the valley to different locations to encourage the Taliban force to deploy. The SASR force lay in wait to ambush Taliban as they infiltrated the area.

The two SASR patrols to the north successfully ambushed armed Taliban as they moved into position. The southern patrols observed armed Taliban. According to Patrol Commander SGT Troy Simmonds, who commanded one of the southern patrols, in a 2013 interview for the Australian War Memorial "The enemy had children near them and due to the extended range and wind, we did not engage them." After the engagement to the north, the northern patrols and command element commenced a foot move back over the mountains to FOB Anaconda. The vehicle element were unable to use an alternate route to return to FOB Anaconda and had to begin moving back through the enemy-controlled valley using a route similar to the one they had used to come in the valley. The two southern SASR patrols, a six-man patrol and a five-man patrol, walked down from the foothills to RV with the US SF vehicles for the extraction from the valley. The SASR hoped to provide additional firepower to assist the withdrawal.

The two SASR patrols distributed themselves on the back of the centre three vehicles. Not long after the vehicles moved off from the RV, they were engaged by accurate mortar fire origination from the river valley of Ana Kalay. The mortars landed around the vehicles but no casualties were sustained. They were also attacked by accurate small arms fire. The force called in air support and ordnance was dropped on the mortar location.

The vehicles were well spaced and had to slowly negotiate rocky terrain in a westerly direction with the green Ana Kalay river valley on their left and a ridge line on their right. The fire intensified and the coalition force began to take casualties.

A number of SASR troops were armed with sniper rifles and they moved away from the vehicles on foot to provide support. The speed of the vehicle was very slow due to the rough terrain and much of the force being on foot. As the vehicles progressed along the valley, the fire intensified resulting in more casualties. SGT Troy Simmonds said "The fire was like rain on the surface of water".

SGT 1st Class Gregory A Rodriguez K-9 unit - 527th Military Police Co, 709th Military Police BN, 18th MP Brigade, a US SF military dog handler was killed by enemy gunfire during the battle.

Eventually the combined force made it out of the valley, having expended nearly all ammunition. The US SF suffered 1 x KIA and 1 x WIA. The Australian SASR troops had 9 x WIA., including both engineers. SGT Troy Simmonds revealed in his 2013 AWM interview, that of his five-man patrol, only one member was not wounded. The other 6 man SASR patrol had three members wounded.

== Aftermath ==
=== Outcome ===
The battle lasted over nine hours before the convoy managed to break off the action and return to the American FOB, Anaconda. They suffered heavy casualties before managing to withdraw. The infamous battle is described as a coalition defeat due to their withdrawal but the casualties sustained by the Taliban were estimated to have been up to 80 KIA, considerably greater than the casualties sustained by the coalition force.

=== Dutch controversy ===
An ADF report says Australian SAS and US forces were abandoned by Dutch allies during the battle in Afghanistan. A former Australian SAS sniper named Rob Maylor, wounded during the battle, said the Australians had pleaded with the Dutch saying: "We're in an absolute doozy of a shitfight. We need your assistance as we're taking casualties".

But the Dutch helicopter pilots refused to offer covering for the Australian, US and Afghan troops in the ambush. The role of the Dutch in the battle was described by Maylor in his book SAS Sniper. He writes that during the battle the Australians saw two Dutch Apache helicopters escorting a Chinook and radioed the pilots to fire their Hellfire laser-guided missiles and 30 mm cannons on the Taliban. But the Dutch pilots refused to drop below 5,000 metres (16,000 ft), despite the Apaches being capable of operating at low levels under heavy fire.

"They wouldn't open up on the Taliban for fear they might draw some fire themselves," Maylor said. In the end the soldier on the ground responsible for guiding air support told the Dutch: "If you're not going to engage then you might as well fuck off." And they did, Maylor writes. Maylor's wounds from the battle were patched up by Donaldson, who was later awarded a VC for gallantry for rescuing a wounded interpreter that day.

These claims were never backed up by any official of the neither the Australian nor the Dutch MOD. The controversy did however draw a lot of attention to the publishing of Maylor's book.

=== SGT Troy Simmonds ===
The Patrol Commander of the forward SAS patrol in the convoy has been identified as SGT Troy Simmonds in Chris Master's book Uncommon Soldier. He was shot by a ricochet in the leg during the latter stages of the battle. In a 2013 video interview for the Australian War Memorial, he recalls how after being shot in the leg, he was then blasted by an RPG explosion landing nearby. Later, he was shot through the back of his hat, his rifle was shot destroying its mechanism and he was shot through the hips. During the withdrawal from the battle, unable to climb on the back or in the vehicle, he jumped in the small space between the 'bull bar' and front of the vehicle. Still receiving heavy fire, he wrapped a heavy chain around his head to protect himself. He explained that, now retired from the Army, he still had a Taliban bullet embedded in his pelvis.

=== Mark Donaldson VC recipient ===
On 2 September 2008, during the conduct of a fighting patrol, Corporal (then Trooper) Donaldson was travelling in a combined Afghan, US and Australian vehicle convoy that was engaged by a numerically superior, entrenched and coordinated enemy ambush. The ambush was initiated by a high volume of sustained machine gun fire coupled with the effective use of rocket propelled grenades. Such was the effect of the initiation that the combined patrol suffered numerous casualties, completely lost the initiative and became immediately suppressed. It was over two hours before the convoy was able to establish a clean break and move to an area free of enemy fire.

Corporal Donaldson's decisive action in the face of accurate and sustained enemy fire ultimately saved the life of a coalition force interpreter and ensured the safety of the other members of the combined Afghan, US and Australian force. His actions are considered in keeping of the traditions of the Special Operations Command, the Australian Army and the Australian Defence Force.

=== Sarbi ===
Sarbi is an Australian special forces explosives detection dog that spent almost 14 months missing in action (MIA) in Afghanistan after disappearing during the Battle of Khaz Oruzgan in September 2008. It is thought that a rocket explosion had scared her off after her leash was broken. She was rediscovered alive in late 2009 when an American soldier noticed Sarbi accompanying a local man. She was later flown back to the Australian base in Tarin Kowt where they confirmed it was indeed Sarbi. Her rediscovery generated worldwide news and was mentioned by Kevin Rudd, and General Stanley McChrystal.

On 5 April 2011 Sarbi was awarded an RSPCA Purple Cross Award at the Australian War Memorial. The RSPCA Australia Purple Cross Award recognises the deeds of animals that have shown outstanding service to humans, particularly if they showed exceptional courage in risking their own safety or life to save a person from injury or death.
