= James Fitzpatrick (paediatrician) =

Australian medical doctor (born 1975)

James Paul Fitzpatrick (born 1975) is an Australian paediatrician notable for his advocacy of rural and indigenous health issues, particularly his work with fetal alcohol spectrum disorder.

== Biography ==
Born in 1975, he grew up in the New South Wales city of Bathurst and attended high school at St Stanislaus' College, from which he graduated in 1991. He studied for a degree in rural science at the University of New England for a year before leaving to spend a year full-time in the army. He then returned to university, graduating with a Bachelor of Science in 1997, before completing a medical degree at the University of Western Australia School of Medicine. While at the University of Western Australia, he joined the state student rural health club SPINRPHEX, campaigning for it to focus on community activities, and organised a children's festival in Carnarvon to bring Aboriginal and non-Aboriginal children together. For his volunteer work concerning suicide and youth health in Australia, he received the 2001 Young Australian of the Year Award.

He then founded True Blue Dreaming, a non-profit, youth mentoring organisation, before expanding his business, PATCHES Paediatrics,, to deliver services focused on developmental disabilities and early intervention in Western Australia and beyond. In 2008, he participated in the Australia 2020 Summit in the Future directions for rural industries and rural communities working group. His PhD thesis with Sydney Medical School was the Lililwan Project, in which he and his collaborators studied the prevalence of fetal alcohol spectrum disorder (FASD) in the Fitzroy River valley in the Kimberley region of Western Australia. He was the inaugural chair of the Australian FASD Clinical Network and developed a prevention strategy for the condition. For his work on FASD, he was a finalist for the 2017 Western Australian of the Year award. He has held research positions at the University of Sydney, the George Institute for Global Health, and Telethon Kids Institute. He is adjunct professor in the University of Western Australia School of Psychological Sciences.

Awards
Preceded by Ian Thorpe	Young Australian of the Year; 2001	Succeeded by Scott Hocknull
