= Daniel Nour =

Australian physician

- Born: 1995 or 1996 (age 30–31); Sydney, New South Wales, Australia
- Education: James Cook University (MBBS)
- Occupation: Physician
- Known for: founding Street Side Medics

Daniel Nour (born 1995 or 1996) is an Australian physician. He is best known for founding Street Side Medics, a mobile medical service specifically created for the people experiencing homelessness.

Nour was named as the Young Australian of the Year in 2022.

== Early life and education ==
Daniel Nour was born in Sydney, New South Wales, in 1995 or 1996. His father had migrated to Australia from Egypt in 1979, settling in Sydney.

He was educated St Joseph's Primary School in Riverwood, St Mark's Coptic School at Wattle Grove and Trinity Grammar School, all in New South Wales. He graduated from Trinity in 2013.

Nour graduated from James Cook University in 2019 with a Bachelor of Medicine, Bachelor of Surgery. During his university studies, he developed an interest in cardiology.

After undertaking placements at regional hospitals in such locations as Babinda, Ingham, and Mossman in Queensland, Nour undertook a placement in the cardiology department of Imperial College London as part of his final year elective.

== Career ==
It was in London that Nour was inspired to establish Street Side Medics, after an incident in June 2020 in which he assisted a homeless person who was having a seizure at Waterloo Station. Upon realising that people experiencing homelessness have difficulty accessing basic medical care, Nour believed that a mobile medical service could benefit homeless people in Australia. This led to him founding Street Side Medics in August 2020.

As of January 2022, while continuing to work full time at Royal North Shore Hospital, Nour was leading a team of approximately 145 volunteers across four locations across New South Wales.

Nour occasionally provides commentary to the media on health-related issues.

== Recognition and honours ==
In November 2021, Nour was named as New South Wales Young Australian of the Year and thus became a national finalist for the title of Young Australian of the Year. Nour was subsequently announced as 2022 Young Australian of the Year in Canberra on 25 January 2025.

In May 2023, he was one of the notable Australians to accept an invitation to attend the Coronation of Charles III and Camilla.

== Personal life ==
Nour is a Coptic Orthodox Christian and is a member of St Mark's Coptic Orthodox Church at Arncliffe.
