= Samar Aoun =

Australian palliative care researcher

Professor Samar Aoun AM
- Born: 1958 or 1959 (age 66–67)
- Education: University of London (PhD)
- Occupation: Palliative care researcher
- Years active: 2004–present

Professor Samar Aoun AM is an Australian palliative care researcher and advocate. She is known for being the Perron Institute Research Chair in Palliative Care at the University of Western Australia, and the recipient of the 2023 Australian of the Year for Western Australia.

== Life ==
Aoun lives in Bunbury, a town in the southwest of Western Australia (WA). She is of Lebanese descent. Her grandfather, Dr. George Aoun, was a doctor who worked in northern Lebanon. Aoun has said that experiencing her own father's death led her to being interested in the field of palliative care.

== Career ==
Aoun is the Perron Institute Research Chair at UWA. She is also an adjunct professor at La Trobe University. Her research and work focuses on under-served communities such as people who have restricted access to healthcare, people with motor neurone disease (MND), people with dementia, people with terminal illness who live alone, and family caregivers.

Aoun is the co-founder and chair of the South West Compassionate Communities Network (SWCCN), which she established in Bunbury. With the SWCCN, Aoun has collaborated with the City of Bunbury to establish the Bunbury Compassionate Charter. She also led the Compassionate Connectors program, which reduced hospital admissions and improved social connectedness for people with advanced life-limiting illnesses in regional Western Australia, through the use of home-based and community-based palliative care.

Aoun is the president of the Motor Neurone Disease Association of Western Australia (MNDAWA), and previously served six years as vice president of the association. As well as being part of the board, she has contributed to MNDAWA by developing and leading MND education programs for regional and rural areas. Some of Aoun's other volunteer roles include being the director of the MND Australiapalliativecare.org.au/story/professor-samar-aoun Board, and being a board member of Palliative Care WA.

In 2023, Aoun was a speaker at the Oceanic Palliative Care Conference at the International Convention Centre in Sydney, where she gave a speech promoting the benefits of increasing death literacy and its relationship to the Compassionate Communities approach to palliative care.

== Awards and honours ==
In 2003, Aoun received the Centenary Medal. In 2018, she received the Medal for Excellence from the European Society for Person Centered Healthcare. She was awarded at the annual Australia Day Honours in 2025, and was appointed a member of the Order of Australia.

Aoun was awarded the MNDAWA Australia Presidents' Cup and an MND Australia life membership in 2024. She also received a life membership from the MNDAWA in 2026. She earned the MNDAWA membership for her 13 years of contributions to the MND community and to MNDAWA including five years of serving as the association's president and six years of serving as its vice president.
