= Penny Flett =

Australian medical specialist (1947–2025)

Penny Flett AO
- Born: Penelope Ruth Clark; March 19, 1947; Shardlow, Derbyshire, United Kingdom
- Died: March 6, 2025 (aged 77); Perth, Western Australia, Australia
- Education: University of Adelaide (MD)
- Partner: Peter Flett
- Children: 1

Penelope Flett (1947–2025) was an Australian medical administrator and geriatric medical specialist. She is known for being the first woman to hold a male rank during peacetime and the first woman doctor to serve in the Royal Australian Air Force (RAAF).

== Early life ==
Flett was born in Shardlow, England on March 19, 1947 to David Clark and Beryl (née Appleby) Clark. She had two younger brothers.

Flett's family moved several times during her childhood, since her father worked as an auditor in the British colonial civil service. When Flett was five months old, her family moved to Lagos, Nigeria, and then to the North Borneo (now Sabah, Malaysia) six years later. When she was 10, she began boarding school at Mayfield School in East Sussex, England. During her time at the school, she would see her parents once a year.

In 1965, after she finished school, Flett moved to Adelaide where her parents had settled. She studied medicine at the University of Adelaide, and graduated in 1971.

== Career ==
=== Early work and RAAF service ===
Following her graduation from medical school, Flett became a resident doctor at Royal Adelaide Hospital. In 1973, When Flett's husband Peter was posted to the RAAF in Laverton, Victoria, Flett moved to Victoria as well, and began working as a senior medical officer at Geelong Hospital.

In 1974, Flett moved to Malaysia when her husband was posted to No. 4 Hospital at the RMAF Butterworth Air Base. Flett started working at the hospital as a civilian doctor first, before joining the RAAF Reserve herself and becoming a flight lieutenant medical officer. This made her the first woman to hold the rank of flight lieutenant in the RAAF. She was also the RAAF's first woman to hold a male rank during peacetime, and the first woman doctor to serve in the RAAF. One of Flett's brothers, Roger, served in the RAAF as a flight lieutenant, too.

In 1975, Penny left the RAAF and moved back to Victoria, where she worked in the Grace McKellar Centre aged care unit at Mount Royal Hospital in Melbourne. This experience inspired her interest in aged care, and she earned a graduate diploma in geriatric medicine in 1983.

=== Later work in Western Australia ===
Flett moved to Perth, Western Australia, in 1984. She became part of the Brightwater Care Group, then named "Homes of Peace", a Perth-based aged care and disability support provider with several residential facilities. In 1986, she became the Chief Executive Officer (CEO) of Brightwater, a position which she held for 20 years. As CEO, Flett lead the organisation to develop a more progressive, person-centred approach to care, and transitioned Brightwater's hospital-like care settings to having more household-like care settings within their residential facilities. One of these was the Oats Street facility for people undergoing rehabilitation following brain injury, which is still active as of 2025.

During her time as CEO of Brightwater, Flett was involved in a federal government home-care pilot program, oversaw the creation of Brightwater's research centre, negotiated a $20 million capital funding arrangement with the WA Health Department, and renamed the organisation "Brightwater Care Group" in 1997. Flett was particularly dedicated to improving care and support for people with dementia, Huntington's disease, and young people with disabilities.

In 1996, Flett became a member of the Chamber of Commerce and Industry of Western Australia (CCIWA), initially serving on the CCIWA's Health and Community Services Council. She later became the first female president of the CCIWA in 2006, a two-year position which she held until 2008.

From 1997 until 2000, Flett served as Chair of the Aged Care Standards and Accreditation Agency Board. In 1998, she was recruited by the Australian Government to form the Aged Care Quality and Safety Commission. Flett was also recruited by governor-general Sir William Deane to work with the Australian Bravery Decorations Council in 1999, and she later became the council's chairperson. In 1999 she became a board member of St George's College, and between 1999 and 2002, she was a board member of the Positive Ageing Foundation of Western Australia.

Between 2002 and 2013, Flett was the inaugural chairperson of the WA Aged Care Advisory Council, where she oversaw the first State Aged Care Plan. In 2003, she became a board member of the State Training Board of Western Australia.

Flett was the pro-chancellor of the University of Western Australia from 2010 until 2018. She was the chair of Methodist Ladies' College between 2012 and 2018. She retired from work in 2016.

== Awards and honours ==
In 1998, Flett was named the Telstra National Australian Business Woman of the Year. She was one of 2330 women nominated for the award. At the same awards show, she received the Ansett Private Sector Award, for women in organisations with over 100 employees.

In 2001, she received the Centenary Medal. In 2014, she became an Officer of the Order of Australia. The University of Western Australia awarded her an honorary degree of doctor of medicine in 2021.

In 2008, Flett received the Aged and Community Services Australia's annual Individual Award. In 2015, Flett was the plenary speaker at the 50th Conference of the Australian Association of Gerontology.

Flett was the Australian of the Year for Western Australia in 2009, the state level of the Australian of the Year awards.

== Personal life ==
Flett met her husband, Peter Flett, when they were both studying medicine at the University of Adelaide. Peter was completed his studies through the RAAF Undergraduate Scheme. The couple married in 1970. In 1978 while living in Victoria, Flett gave birth to her and her husband's first and only child, a son named Tom. Her hobbies reportedly included painting, quilting, playing cello and piano, and sailing, the latter of which she did with her husband. Flett died in Subiaco, Perth, in 2025. She was survived by her husband, her son, and her two grandchildren.
