= Sarbi =

Australian explosives detection dog

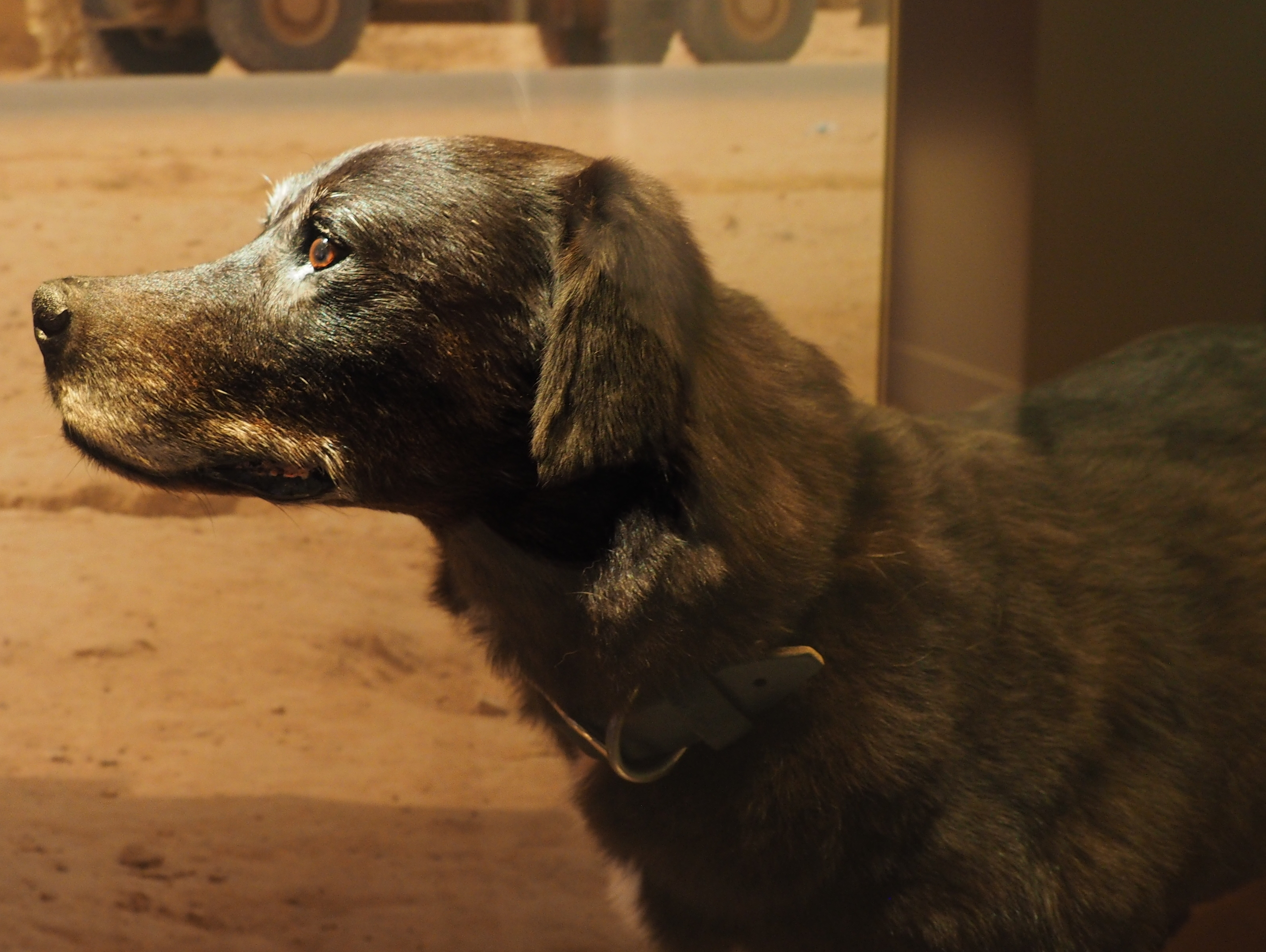
- The preserved remains of Sarbi at the Australian War Memorial
- Other name: Sabi
- Species: Dog
- Breed: Labrador/Newfoundland cross
- Sex: Female
- Born: 11 September 2002; Southern Highlands (New South Wales); Australia
- Died: 27 March 2015 (aged 12)
- Nationality: Australian
- Employer: Special forces of Australia
- Notable role: Explosives detection dog
- Years active: 2006–2008
- Known for: Missing in action in Afghanistan for 14 months
- Facebook

Sarbi (11 September 2002 – 27 March 2015) was an Australian special forces explosives detection dog that spent almost 14 months missing in action (MIA) in Afghanistan having disappeared during an ambush on 2 September 2008. Sarbi was later rediscovered by an American soldier, and was reunited with Australian forces pending repatriation to Australia.

== Background ==
Sarbi was a female black Labrador Retriever Newfoundland cross trained in explosives detection. For her role in Afghanistan, Sarbi was trained to detect improvised explosive devices (IEDs) in Orūzgān Province. Contradictory reports at the time of her discovery put Sarbi's age at either four or ten years old. Sarbi had previously been used by the Incident Response Regiment during the 2006 Commonwealth Games held in Melbourne, Australia, before being deployed to Afghanistan as part of the Australian Army's Operation Slipper. Operation Slipper was the name of Australian military's part during the War in Afghanistan, in which a Taliban insurgency is fighting forces of the International Security Assistance Force. When she disappeared, Sarbi was in her second tour of duty in Afghanistan, having previously been deployed in 2007.

== Loss and rediscovery ==
Sarbi went missing after a joint Australian, American and Afghan vehicle convoy was ambushed by insurgents on 2 September 2008 during the Battle of Khaz Oruzgan. Sarbi reportedly disappeared 'in the heat of battle' and was said by a Defence spokesperson to have vanished when a rocket exploded near her during the ambush. The ambush in which Sarbi went missing was the same action in which SASR Trooper Mark Donaldson became the first recipient of the Victoria Cross for Australia, the first VC awarded to an Australian since 1969. Sarbi was declared MIA in September 2008, and while missing, the Special Operations Task Group had made repeated attempts to find out what had become of her.

Sarbi was rediscovered in November 2009 by an American soldier in north-eastern Oruzgan province, when he noticed Sarbi accompanying a local man. The soldier, only identified as 'John', was aware that the Australian forces were missing a dog, and determined through the use of voice commands that Sarbi was indeed a trained military dog. After being flown back to her Australian base in Tarin Kowt, handlers confirmed the dog was Sarbi.

== Reactions ==
The news of Sarbi's return had been released by the Department of Defence on Wednesday 11 November (Remembrance Day), and generated worldwide media attention. The news was released on the same day as the Australian Prime Minister Kevin Rudd and the ISAF head General Stanley A. McChrystal were making a surprise visit to the Tarin Kowt base, leading to their meeting Sarbi in person. Brigadier Brian Dawson, Head of Defence Public Affairs, held a press conference about Sarbi.

Prime Minister Rudd said of Sarbi's rediscovery:

Things like that, they may seem quite small, but in fact the symbolism is quite strong, and the symbolism of it is us out there doing a job...We haven't awarded any Australian Victoria Cross for 40 years. Trooper Donaldson stands out there as an Australian hero, and now his dog Sarbi back is home in one piece and a genuinely nice pooch as well.

Retired Lieutenant Colonel George Hulse, president of the Australian Defence Force Trackers and War Dogs Association, stated he and many others had "abandoned any hope" of finding Sarbi. On her return, Hulse described Sarbi as "an exceptionally good worker, very gritty dog and has found improvised explosive devices and she's saved quite a few lives in her work."

Sarbi's handler Corporal David Simpson, who was one of nine Australian soldiers injured in the ambush, was said to have never given up hope of finding her, and was profoundly relieved at her recovery, according to Hulse. The trainer who confirmed Sarbi's identity said "It’s amazing, just incredible, to have her back."

Trooper Donaldson, who was in London to meet The Queen at the time of Sarbi's rediscovery, said that it "closed a chapter in their shared history" and "She's the last piece of the puzzle ... Having Sarbi back gives some closure for the handler and the rest of us that served with her in 2008. It's a fantastic morale booster for the guys."

Brigadier Dawson said that the military would probably never know what had happened to Sarbi while she was missing, but said that her good health indicated somebody had been looking after her. A Queensland based trainer of a similar black Labrador explosive detection dog stated that it was probably due to the breed's excellent character that Sarbi had most likely been looked after by locals while missing, ensuring her survival. Misha Schubert the political correspondent for The Age jokingly questioned the official account that Sarbi's whereabouts while she was missing would never be known, suggesting she had been undercover on a secret mission, or that she had been captured by the Taliban as a prisoner of war, or had simply preferred to remain Absent Without Leave (AWOL).

The Australian reported on 13 November that, according to "a senior Australian military officer who asked not to be named", that Sarbi, who had been wounded in the ambush, had in fact returned to a nearby ISAF forward operating base, but was "chased away by Afghan guards".

The Sunday Age on 15 November questioned the timing of the original press release about Sarbi's rediscovery, claiming that it had been deliberately held back to coincide with Prime Minister Rudd's visit to Afghanistan so as to be able to give the story to accompanying reporters. This was based on the fact that Sarbi had been in the hands of Australian forces by at least 28 October based on ADF photos posted on their website on the day of Brigadier Dawson's news conference, and not the week of 1–7 November as released. They further pointed out that questions over the timing of the release by a reporter at the Brigadier's press conference were not corrected by him. An ADF spokesperson denied any link to the visit, stating the delay in releasing the news was due to "the need to confirm Sarbi's identity, physical condition and quarantine requirements for her return to Australia", details of which would be required by the media, that the reference to "last week" was correct at the time of the release's first draft and unfortunately not been subsequently updated before release, and that "Brigadier Dawson was not aware of the exact date of Sarbi's return and was therefore not in a position to be specific about it." Brigadier Dawson had at the time insisted that the timing of the announcement coinciding with Rudd's visit had been "pure serendipity", and said "We needed to make sure that we had all our facts straight...(so) it's really just an accident".

== Repatriation ==
Sarbi was to undergo a period of quarantine, and be assessed for exposure to diseases, before a return date to Australia could be set. The Sydney Morning Herald reported that Sarbi had passed initial veterinary checks and would be retired on her return to Australia. Prime Minister Rudd stated he would be working with the Australian Quarantine and Inspection Service (AQIS) to "ensure Sarbi's eventual return to Australia." The Courier-Mail reported that under AQIS rules, dogs would not normally be allowed entry to Australia directly from Afghanistan, but would rather have to spend six months in an intermediate approved country.

After arriving back in Australia, there was much debate as to what would happen with Sarbi before Sarbi was eventually given to her former handler and his wife, retiring shortly after. She also became a member of the Clayfield-Toombul Sub-Branch of the RSL. A dog park in the Brisbane suburb of Warner was named in Sarbi's honour in February 2015.

Sarbi died as a result of a brain tumour on 27 March 2015. Her preserved remains were donated to the Australian War Memorial and placed on display in October 2016.

== RSPCA Purple Cross Award ==
On 5 April 2011, Sarbi was awarded an RSPCA Purple Cross Award at the Australian War Memorial. The RSPCA Australia Purple Cross Award recognises the deeds of animals that have shown outstanding service to humans, particularly if they showed exceptional courage in risking their own safety or life to save a person from injury or death.

== See also ==
- Dogs in warfare
- List of Labrador Retrievers
- List of individual dogs (war dogs)
