= Australia in the War in Afghanistan =

Australian contribution to the War in Afghanistan (2001–2021)

Operation Slipper and Operation Highroad
- Part of the War in Afghanistan (2001–2021)
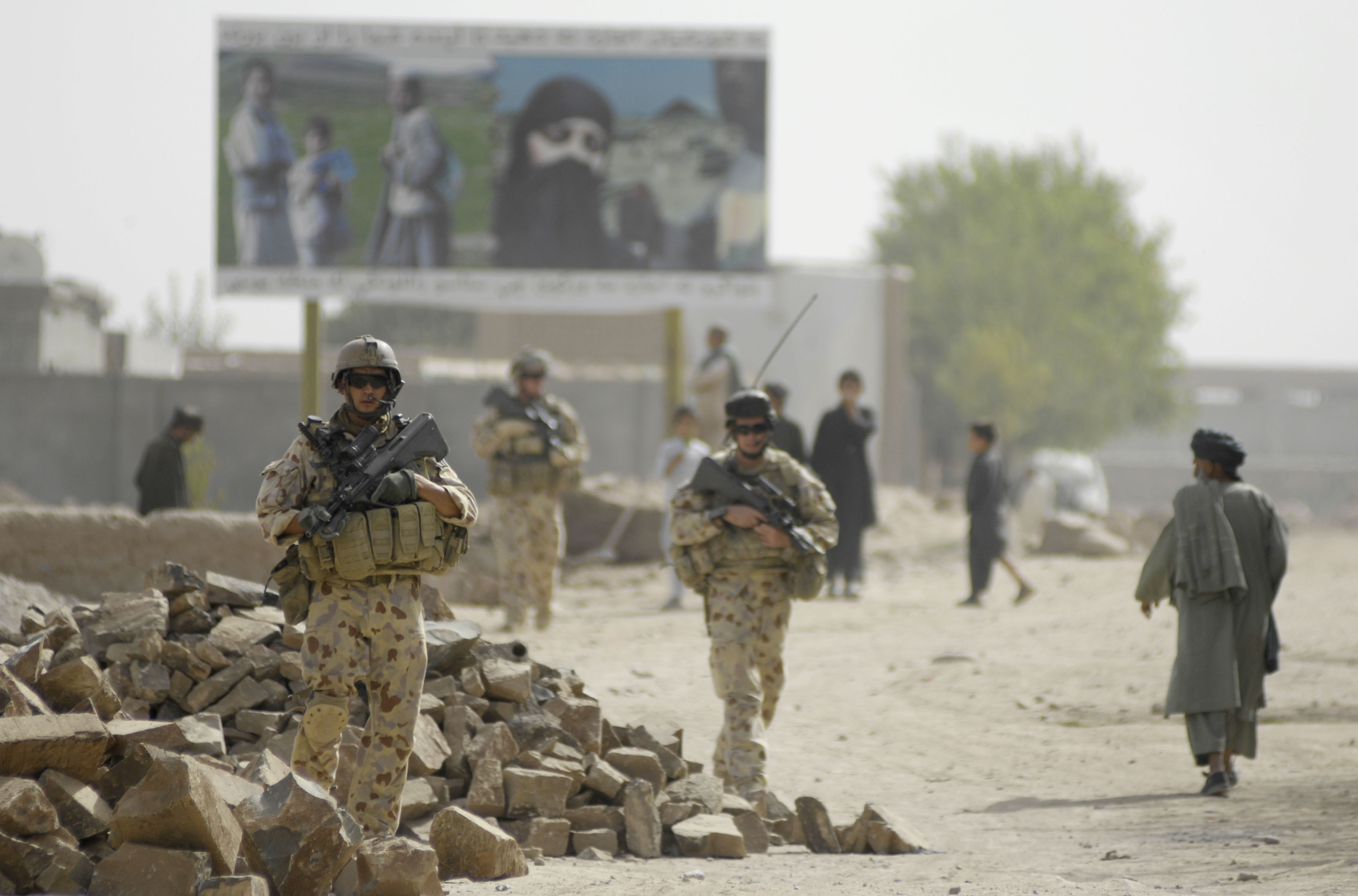
- Infantry from 3 RAR patrol Tarin Kowt in August 2008 as part of Reconstruction Task Force 4
- Location: Afghanistan, the Persian Gulf and Diego Garcia
- Date: 2001–2021
- Casualties: 41 killed, 261 wounded

The Australian contribution to the War in Afghanistan has been known as Operation Slipper (2001–2014) and Operation Highroad (2015–2021).

Australian Defence Force (ADF) operations and the size of the forces deployed have varied and ADF involvement has included two major areas of activity: Afghanistan and the Persian Gulf. These activities have seen the deployment of naval, air and land forces that have taken part in combat and combat support operations as part of the International Security Assistance Force (ISAF).

In mid-2014, the naval and logistic support operations in the Persian Gulf were re-designated as Operation Manitou and Operation Accordion respectively.

== Operation Slipper ==
Operation Slipper began in late 2001 and ended on 31 December 2014.

=== First phase ===
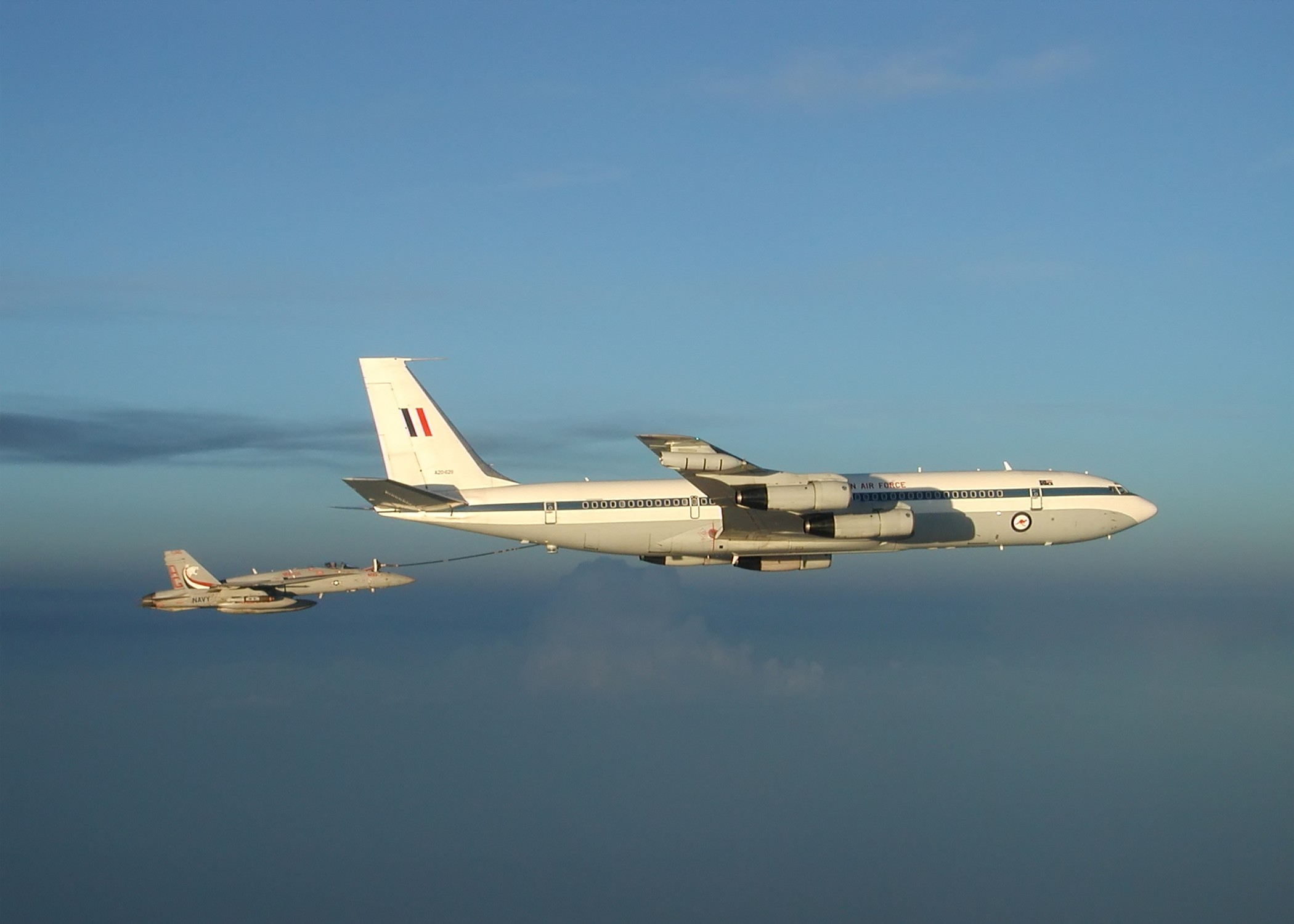
A No. 33 Squadron Boeing 707 refuelling a US Navy F/A-18 in 2002

During the first phase of Operation Slipper, the Australian Defence Force (ADF) commitment to Afghanistan consisted of a Special Forces Task Group and two Royal Australian Air Force (RAAF) Boeing 707 air-to-air refuelling aircraft from No. 33 Squadron. These aircraft and associated support personnel operated from Manas Air Base in Kyrgyzstan and provided support to coalition aircraft operating in Afghan airspace. Two RAAF AP-3C Orion aircraft flew maritime patrol missions in support of maritime interdiction operations in the Persian Gulf. These aircraft were temporarily retasked to Operations Falconer and Catalyst in 2003.

Royal Australian Navy units including HMAS Anzac (already in theatre) and an RAN Logistic Support element deployed to Bahrain in early November 2001. HMAS Anzac was subsequently replaced by a Task Force comprising HMA Ships Kanimbla, Sydney and Adelaide in early December 2001 in support of maritime interdiction operations.

RAAF C-130 Hercules transport aircraft were also involved in providing logistic support for deployed forces. The Special Forces were involved with the establishment of the US-led coalition's first Forward Operating Base (Camp Rhino) southwest of Kandahar in November 2001, followed by the capture of Kandahar International Airport in December 2001. The initial ADF commitment in Afghanistan concluded in December 2002 when the Special Air Service Task Group was withdrawn. Following this date until 2005 Australia's total contribution to efforts in Afghanistan were two officers attached to the United Nations and the Coalition land mine clearing force.

All three squadrons of the Australian Special Air Service Regiment (SASR) were deployed to Afghanistan in 2001 and 2002. The dates of these deployments were:

- 1 Squadron Group, SASR: (October 2001 – April 2002)
- 3 Squadron Group, SASR: (April 2002 – August 2002)
- 2 Squadron Group, SASR: (August 2002 – November 2002)

=== Second phase ===
An Australian Special Forces Task Group was re-deployed to Afghanistan in August or September 2005. This Task Group consisted of elements from the SASR, 4th Battalion, Royal Australian Regiment (Commando), the Incident Response Regiment and logistic support personnel. As well as heavily modified Land Rovers, the Special Forces Task Group was also equipped with some Bushmaster infantry mobility vehicles. A detachment of two CH-47 Chinook helicopters from the 5th Aviation Regiment was deployed to Afghanistan in March 2006 to support the Special Forces Task Group. The Australian Special Forces Task Group was withdrawn from Afghanistan in September 2006 and the helicopter detachment returned to Australia in April 2007.

=== Third phase ===
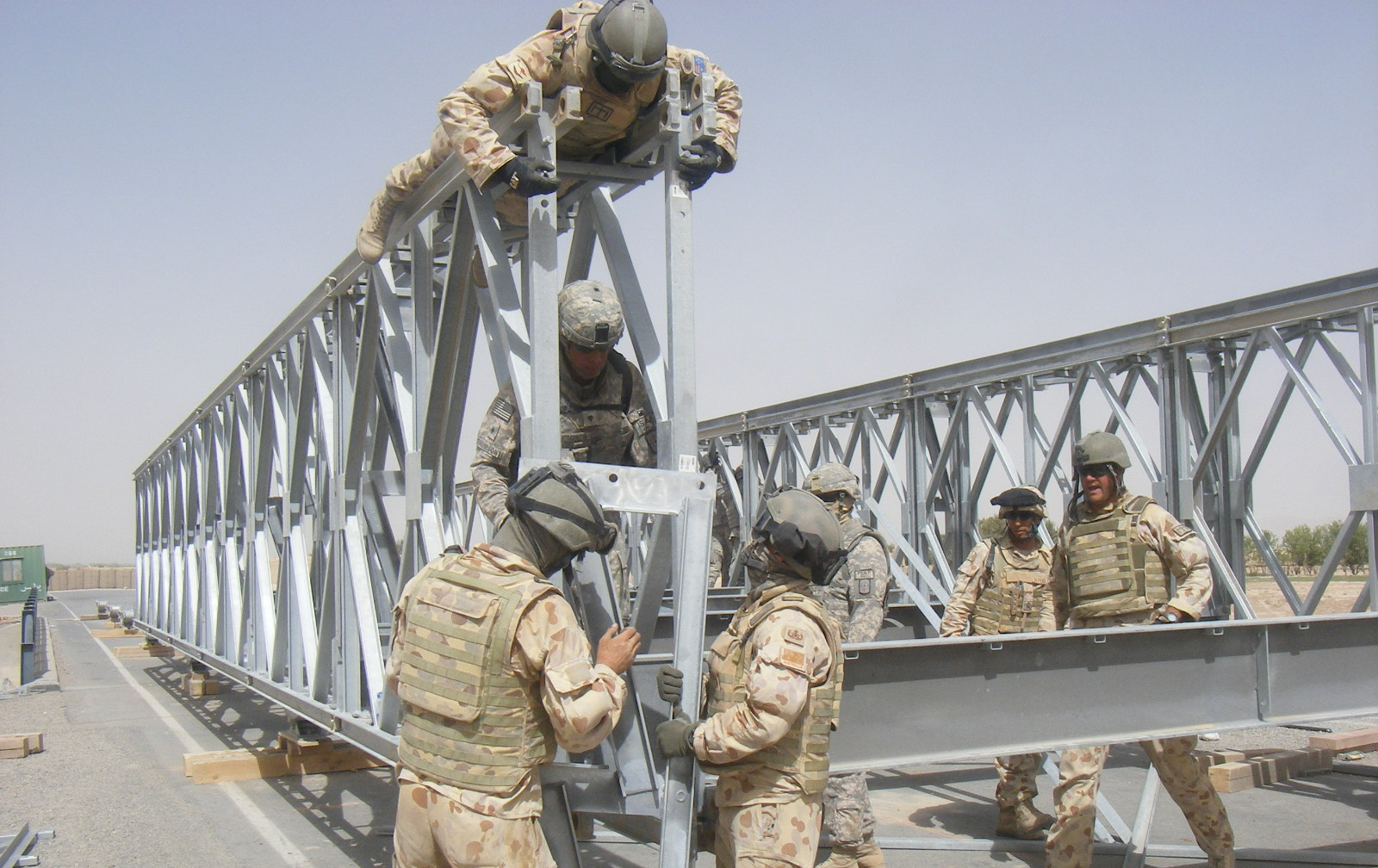
Australian and US Army engineers working on a bridge in Afghanistan in August 2008

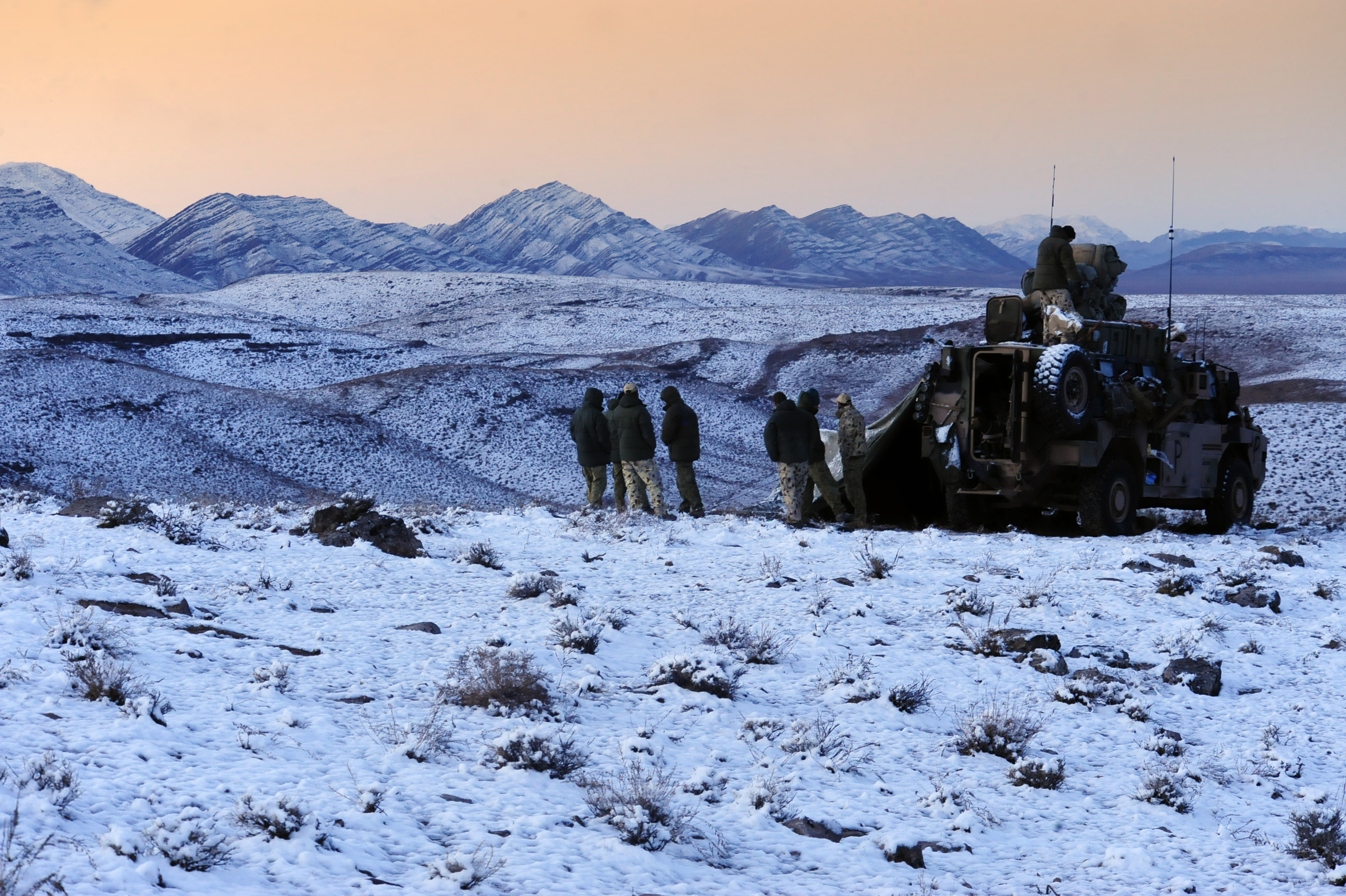
Australian Special Operations Task Group in Afghanistan's Uruzgan Province in January 2010

A Reconstruction Taskforce-based around the 1st Combat Engineer Regiment with protective elements from the 5th/7th Battalion, Royal Australian Regiment, 6th Battalion, Royal Australian Regiment and 2nd Cavalry Regiment began arriving in Uruzgan Province in southern Afghanistan in early September 2006. The Australian Reconstruction Taskforce formed part of a Dutch-led Provincial Reconstruction Team, operating as part of the Dutch-led Task Force Uruzgan and based at Forward Operating Base Ripley, outside of Tarin Kowt.

A 300-strong Special Operations Task Group was deployed to support the Reconstruction Taskforce in April 2007, including a Commando company-group, elements of the SASR, and an integral combat service support team. In addition to radar crews, logistics and intelligence officers, and security personnel, this brought the number of Australian personnel in Afghanistan to 950 by mid-2007, with further small increases to 1,000 in mid-2008, 1,100 in early 2009 and 1,550 in mid-2009. These increases occurred in spite of opinion polls indicating that public support for the deployment was decreasing, with a poll released in September 2008 finding that a majority of those surveyed were opposed to Australia's continued military involvement in the country.

In early 2009, a number of Operational Mentoring and Liaison Teams (OMLTs) were embedded into the Afghan National Army battalions serving in the 4th (ANA) Brigade, 205th Hero Corps, in Uruzgan as part of the Australian mission to mentor and partner the ANA within the province. Consequently, the RTF was renamed the Mentoring and Reconstruction Task Force. On 16 January 2009, Trooper Mark Donaldson, a member of the SASR, was awarded Australia's highest gallantry medal, the Victoria Cross for Australia. Donaldson was awarded the medal for exposing himself to enemy fire to protect injured Australian troops and then rescuing an Afghan interpreter under heavy enemy fire during a contact on 2 September 2008.

A modest Australian force remained in Afghanistan over this period and was involved in counter-insurgency operations in Uruzgan province in conjunction with Dutch, US and other coalition forces. MRTF was again renamed to the Mentoring Task Force in early 2010. Based around a combined arms battalion-sized battle group, it consisted of motorised infantry and cavalry force elements supported by engineers, as well as coalition enablers including artillery and aviation assets. The Rotary Wing Group flying CH-47D Chinooks, the Force Logistics Asset and an RAAF air surveillance radar unit were also based in Kandahar. A further 800 Australian logistic personnel were also based outside of Afghanistan, in locations in the Middle East. Meanwhile, detachments of maritime patrol and transport aircraft continued to support operations in Iraq and Afghanistan, based out of Al Minhad Air Base in the United Arab Emirates.

=== Order of battle ===
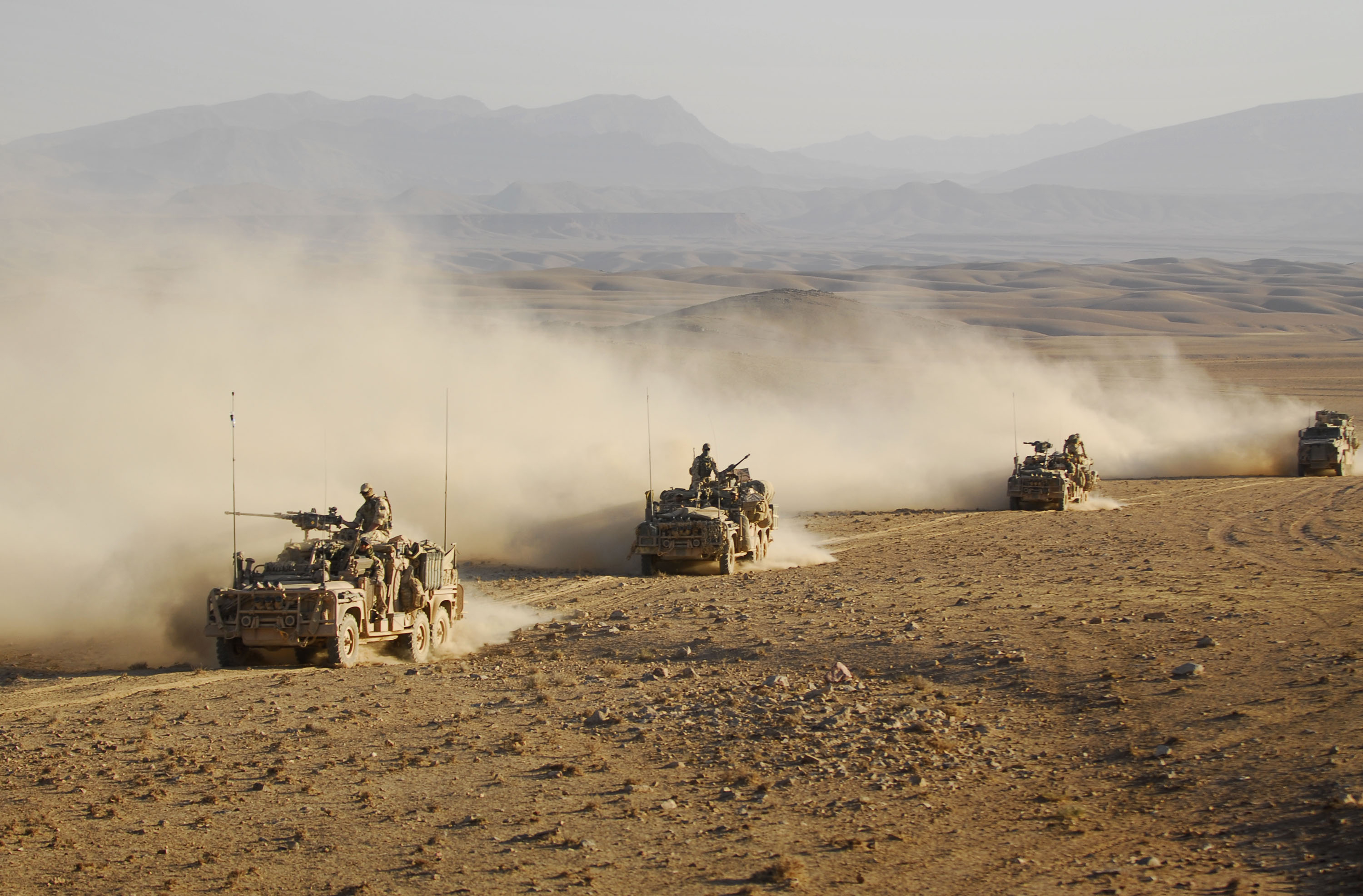
A Special Operations Task Group patrol in October 2009

Over the course of the operation, as the size of Australia's contribution has fluctuated and the scope of operations undertaken has evolved, the number and type of units deployed has also changed. A snapshot of the order of battle from March 2011, when approximately 1,550 Australians were deployed to Afghanistan, is as follows:

- National Command Element
  - Mentoring Task Force 2 (MTF-2)
    - Headquarters, 5th Battalion, Royal Australian Regiment (5 RAR)
    - 4 x Combat Teams including infantry, cavalry, engineers and offensive support
    - 5 x Operational Mentoring and Liaison Teams
    - Force Communications Unit IV (1st Combat Signal Regiment)
    - Logistics and support units
  - Detachment, 20th Surveillance and Target Acquisition Regiment, Royal Australian Artillery (operates ScanEagle UAVs)
  - Special Operations Task Group
    - Elements of the SASR, 2nd Commando Regiment, Reserve 1 Commando Regiment and Special Operations Engineer Regiment
  - Rotary Wing Group (including two CH-47D Chinooks helicopters).
  - Detachment, 1st Regiment, Royal Australian Artillery (16 gunners attached to the British Army)
  - RAAF Control and Reporting Centre (Kandahar International Airport)
  - Two AP-3C Orion maritime patrol aircraft and three C-130 Hercules transports
  - Personnel embedded with various coalition units
  - Force Level Logistic Asset (Kandahar International Airport)

=== Departure of Australian combat forces ===
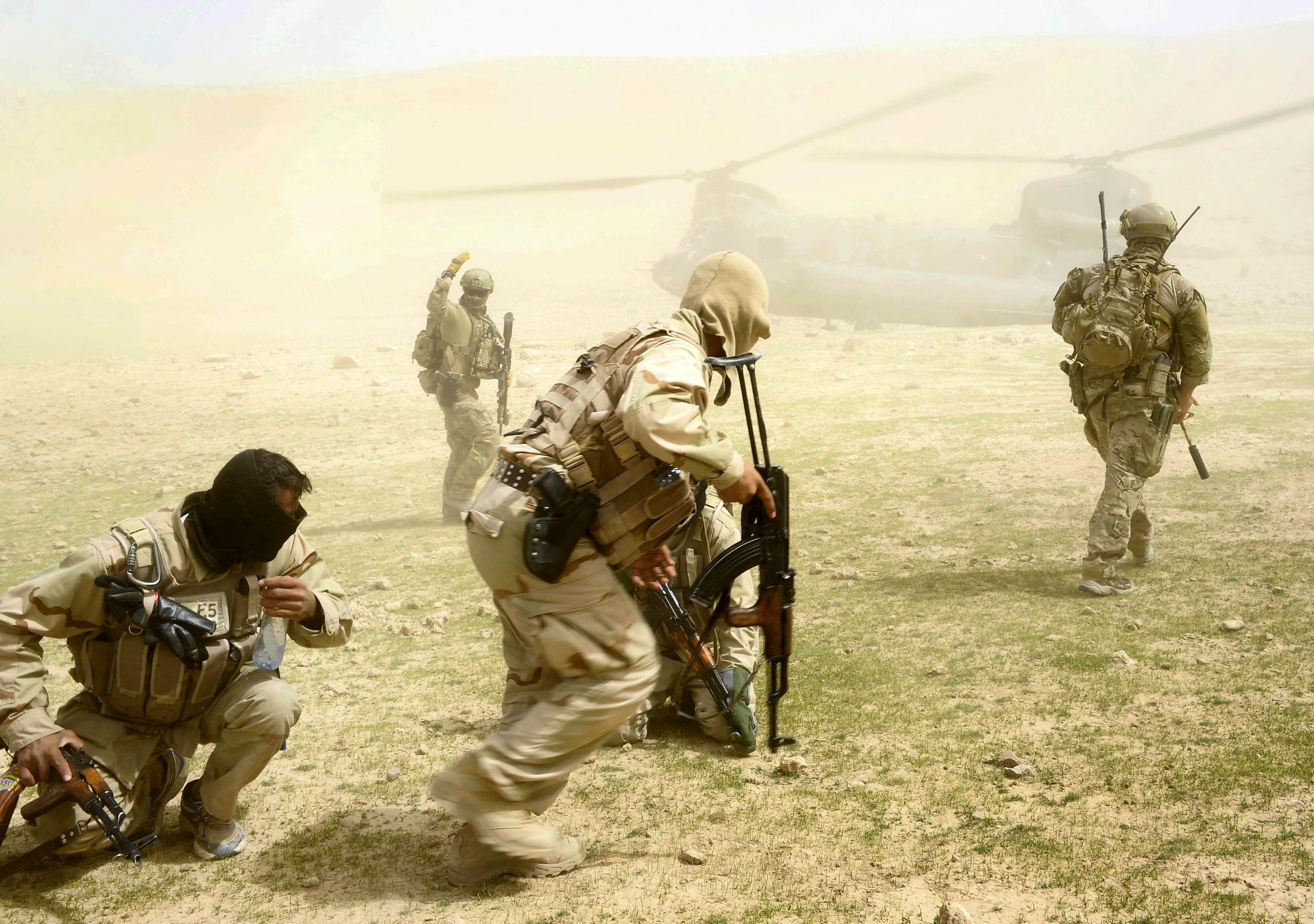
Commandos from 2nd Commando Regiment boarding a U.S. Army Chinook helicopter with Afghan National Army in 2012

At the end of October 2013, Prime Minister Tony Abbott traveled to Afghanistan with Opposition Leader Bill Shorten for a special ceremony at the Australian base in Tarin Kowt in Uruzgan. He told a gathering of troops and Afghan leaders that "Australia's longest war is ending. Not with victory, not with defeat, but with, we hope, an Afghanistan that is better for our presence here." Afghan forces were scheduled to take over running of the camp in mid-December. The last combat troops were withdrawn on 15 December 2013; however, approximately 400 personnel remained in Afghanistan as trainers and advisers, and were stationed in Kandahar and Kabul.

On 1 July 2014, as part of the restructuring of Australian operations in the Middle East, Operation Slipper was split into three different operations: ongoing operations in Afghanistan as part of ISAF under Operation Slipper; maritime security operations in the Middle East and counter piracy in the Gulf of Aden under Operation Manitou; and support operations to Slipper and Manitou from a number of locations in the Gulf States, primarily the United Arab Emirates, under Operation Accordion. Approximately 400 personnel were deployed on Operation Slipper, another 550 as part of Accordion, and 250 on Manitou. Australian operations in Afghanistan were scheduled to continue until the ISAF mission concluded in December 2014, while its contribution to the NATO-led "train, advise, assist" mission post-2014 was still to be confirmed at that time. The final Heron UAV detachment left Afghanistan in December 2014.

Operation Slipper concluded on 31 December 2014, with Australia's "train, advise and assist" mission in Afghanistan as part of the NATO-led Resolute Support Mission being conducted under the code-name Operation Highroad after this date. Approximately 400 Australian personnel were deployed as part of the new mission, including personnel in mentoring and advisory roles, as well as medical personnel, force protection and logistic support. Over 26,000 Australian personnel have served in Afghanistan.

In June 2018, ABC News published photographs depicting Australian soldiers flying Nazi swastikas on their vehicles in Afghanistan. Their actions were subsequently denounced by then Prime Minister Malcolm Turnbull.

=== War crimes inquiry ===
In May 2016 the Inspector-General of the Australian Defence Force, Major General Paul Brereton, launched an inquiry into allegations that some Australian special forces personnel committed war crimes in Afghanistan between 2005 and 2016. In February 2020 it was announced that 55 incidents were being investigated and, in November 2020, the inspector-general concluded that 36 incidents ought to be referred to the Australian Federal Police for criminal investigation and possible prosecution by the Department of Home Affairs' Office of the Special Investigator and Commonwealth Director of Public Prosecutions.

According to Brereton's report, there is credible information that 25 Australian Defence Force personnel were involved in serious crimes in Afghanistan. Of the soldiers, 19 were directly implicated in the murder of 39 prisoners and civilians, and cruel treatment of 2 others, while the other military personnel were believed to be accessories to the incidents. Brereton noted that some of the soldiers were ordered by their patrol commanders to kill prisoners. Some soldiers are also believed to have planted evidence next to civilian corpses to imply that the civilians were armed, and thus could be classified as legitimate targets in post-incident investigations. The report describes a 2012 incident as having been "possibly the most disgraceful episode in Australia's military history", but the specifics were redacted in the version released to the public.

Upon the report's release, Chief of the Australian Defence Force, General Angus Campbell, apologised for "any wrongdoing by Australian soldiers". He announced that the 2nd Squadron of the Special Air Service Regiment (SASR) would be disbanded as a result of the investigation, citing a "distorted culture" that undermined the moral authority of the Australian Defence Force, through all three SASR squadrons were implicated in poor conduct.) According to one reporter's correspondence with a former patrol commander, "EVERYONE KNEW [emphasis in the original]" that war crimes had been committed, but when it was reported regiment leadership decided to handle the matter internally. General Campbell also explained that he and the Chief of Army, Lieutenant General Rick Burr, would take further action with respect to the commanders of units apparently involved in war crimes.

Journalist Mark Willacy estimates that prosecutions related to these findings may not be concluded until approximately the year 2030.

=== Final withdrawal ===
A contingent of around 80 ADF personnel remained in Afghanistan as late as 2021 to train and advise Afghan forces. The Australian embassy in Kabul was closed on 28 May that year. The last ADF personnel and diplomats in Afghanistan departed on 18 June 2021. This formed part of the withdrawal of international forces from the country.

Following the fall of Kabul in August 2021, ADF personnel were used to evacuate Australians and Afghans who had assisted the Australian forces from Afghanistan. Three RAAF aircraft and 250 personnel were deployed from Australia to the Middle East as part of this effort. The first evacuation flight from Kabul took place on the night of 17/18 August. Prime Minister Scott Morrison stated that it would not be possible to evacuate all the Afghans who had assisted the Australian forces due to the situation in the country.

== Persian Gulf ==
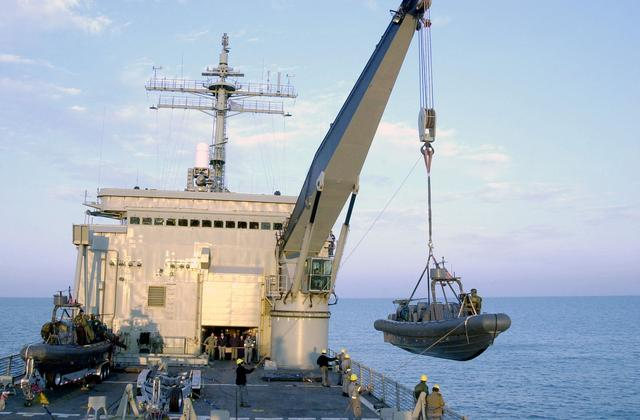
HMAS Kanimbla preparing to launch a US Navy rigid hull inflatable boat in January 2002

Since October 2001 the Royal Australian Navy (RAN) has maintained a continuous presence in and around Iraqi territorial waters as part of Operation Slipper and subsequent operations. There were four major rotations of RAN ships to this area of operations between December 2001 and March 2003. The primary focus of these rotations was to conduct Maritime Interception Operations as part of a US, Australian and British force enforcing United Nations Security Council resolutions against Iraq. The first rotation consisted of Her Majesty's Australian Ships (HMAS) Sydney, Adelaide and Kanimbla. These ships were followed in February 2002 by HMA Ships Canberra, Newcastle and Manoora and again in July 2002 by HMAS Arunta and Melbourne.

HMAS Kanimbla departed from Sydney, Australia on 20 January 2003 again bound for the Persian Gulf under the mission objectives of Operation Bastille. On arriving in Bahrain on 16 February she reverted to the original mission objects of Operation Slipper (that of enforcing UN sanctions against Iraq). On 20 March 2003, HMA Ships Kanimbla, Anzac and Darwin participated in the combat phase of the 2003 Iraq War, codenamed Operation Falconer; in April Kanimbla supported Operation Baghdad Assist, delivering medical supplies that were transported to Baghdad. During these operations the Australian ships pioneered a number of techniques that increased the effectiveness of Maritime Interception Force operations leading to them intercepting and boarding about 1,700 vessels in this period. Four Australian naval officers commanded the multinational force at various times during the course of the operation. Detachments from the Army's 16th Air Defence Regiment provided point defence to the Kanimbla and Manoora during their deployments.

From 2009 Australian warships and aircraft in the Middle East have also been involved in counter-piracy operations and maritime interdiction off the Horn of Africa as part of Combined Task Force 151.

== Diego Garcia ==
A detachment of four Australian F/A-18 Hornet fighter aircraft provided air defence for the US military base on the island of Diego Garcia, British Indian Ocean Territory during the campaign against the Taliban. The initial detachment was provided by No. 77 Squadron RAAF between December 2001 and 10 February 2002. This was replaced by a detachment from No. 3 Squadron RAAF which was deployed between 10 February 2002 and 20 May 2002. No further Australian units were deployed to Diego Garcia.

== Casualties ==
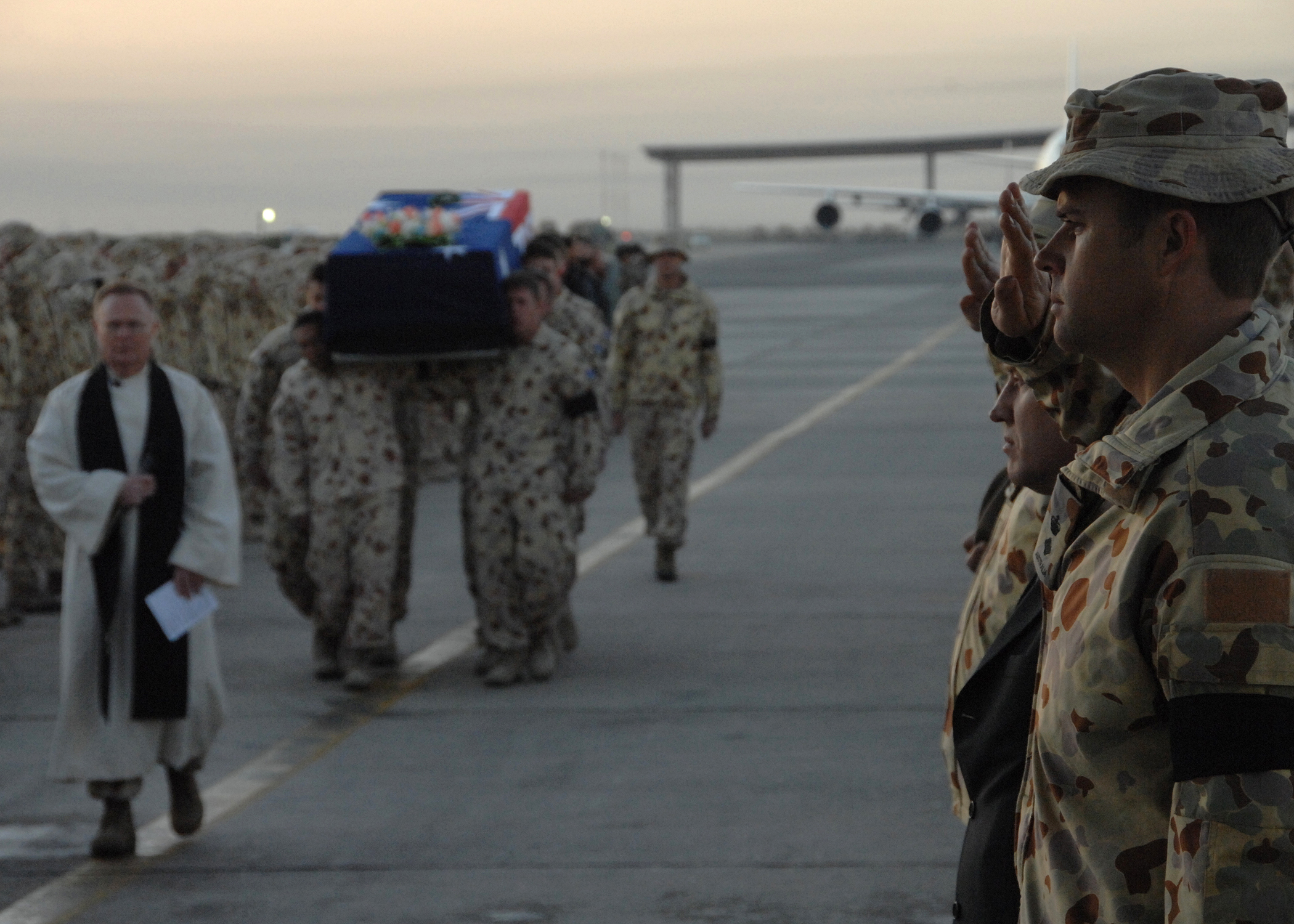
The repatriation ceremony held for Private Sher on 7 January 2009

Operation Slipper is notable for the first Australian combat deaths since the Vietnam War, and to date all casualties have occurred during operations in Afghanistan. 41 Australian soldiers have been killed and 261 wounded, the majority since October 2007. Another Australian was killed while serving with the British Army.

== Timeline ==
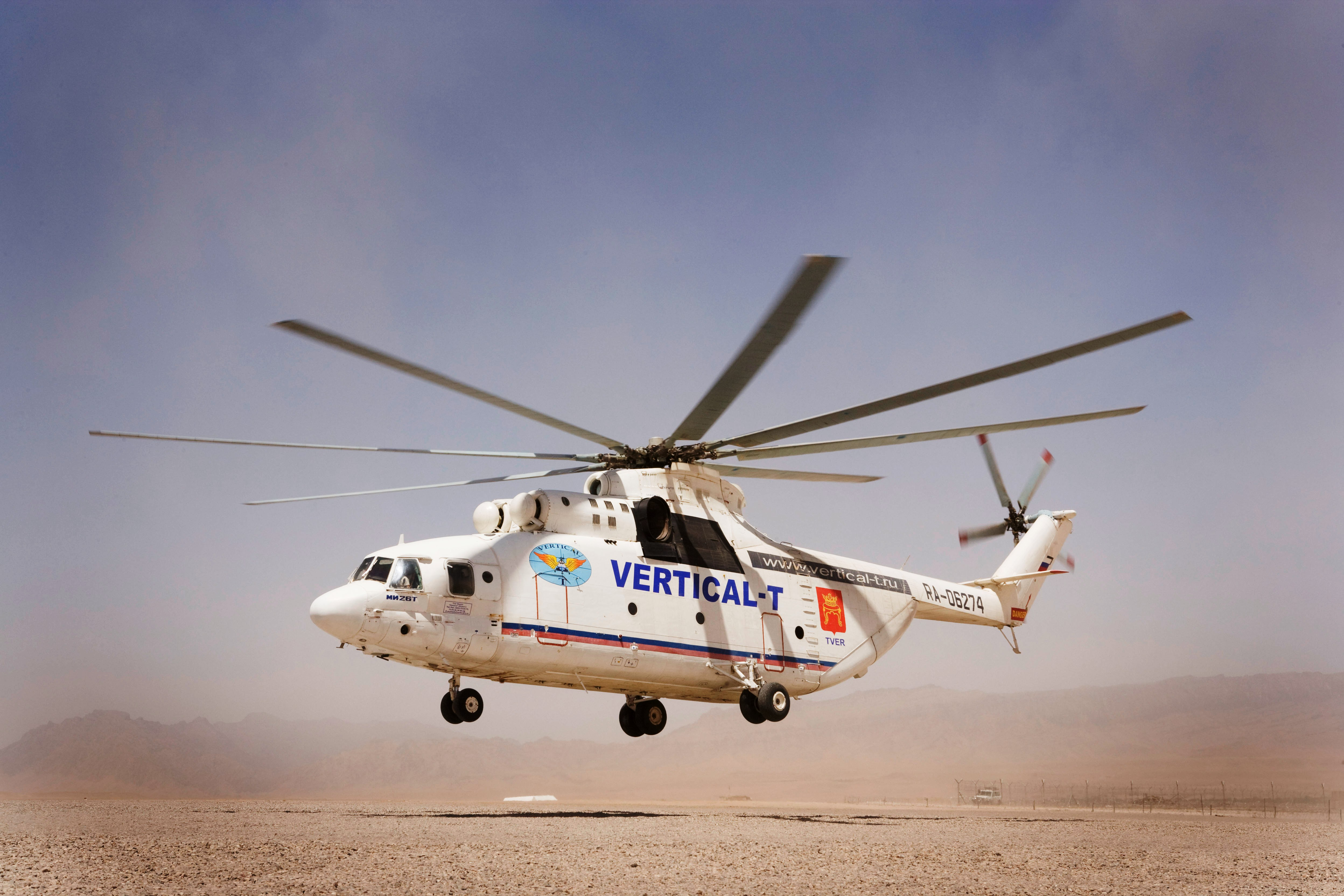
From March 2011, the ADF in Afghanistan has exclusive rights to a leased Mi-26 Halo heavy lift helicopter provided by PME International-Vertical T, enabling deployed forces to be less reliant on road transport.

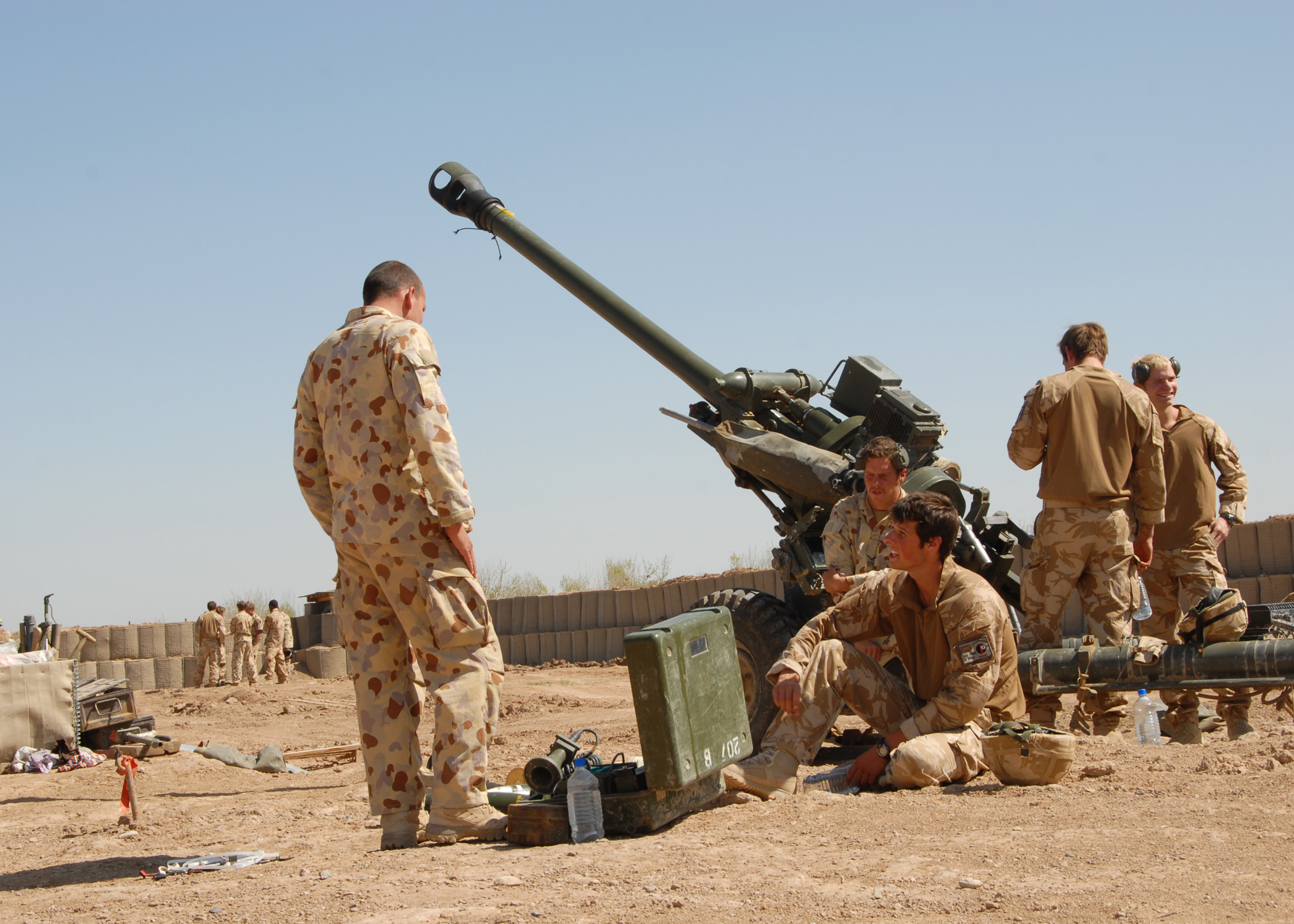
Australian and British gunners, March 2009

2001	11 September: Islamist terrorists attack New York City and Washington, killing nearly 3,000 people.; November: The first Australian forces are committed.
2002	16 February: Sergeant Andrew Russell (SASR) becomes the first Australian killed in Afghanistan after his patrol vehicle struck a land mine.; March: Australian and coalition forces conduct a major offensive to clear the Paktia region along the border with Pakistan in Operation Anaconda. More than 500 Taliban were reported killed.
2006	July: During Operation Perth Australian special forces troops, working together with Netherlands Korps Commandotroepen, killed 150 Taliban and al-Qaeda fighters in nine days of fierce fighting in the Chora district, 40 kilometres (25 mi) north-east of Tarin Kowt in southern Afghanistan. The fighting was the heaviest experienced by Australian forces since the Vietnam War and saw six Australians wounded in action.
2007	15–19 June: Battle of Chora.
2008	2 September: Nine Australian Special Forces soldiers are wounded, including three seriously, during a major ambush on their patrol by insurgents.
2009	16 January: Trooper Mark Donaldson (SASR) was awarded the Victoria Cross for Australia for gallantry under heavy enemy fire during a contact on 2 September 2008.; March/April: Australian troops from the Special Operations Task Group and the Mentoring and Reconstruction Task Force killed at least 80 Taliban fighters in a major four-week operation in Helmand province. An Australian bomb disposal expert was killed and four others wounded.; 12 April: Heavy fighting during Operation Shak Hawel in the Chora Valley north of Tarin Kowt resulted in the Battle of Kakarak during which a large Taliban force unsuccessfully attempted to ambush an Australian combined arms platoon from MRTF-1. Insurgent casualties were heavy and believed to include 20 killed and 20 wounded, while there were no Australian casualties.; Early May: A senior insurgent commander, Mullah Noorullah, was killed in a joint Australian operation after he and one other insurgent were tracked moving into a tunnel system by Special Forces in Oruzgan province. Noorullah was also understood to have been involved in the major battle with Afghan and Australian forces on 12 April.; October: Sabi, an Australian special forces explosives detection dog which was declared missing in action after 2 September 2008 ambush, is recovered safe and well.
2010	21–23 April: Australian Special Forces soldiers responding to a call for help from elders in Gizab in northern Uruzgan become involved in heavy fighting over several days, after local nationals staged an uprising against the shadow Taliban government. During the uprising residents of Gizab captured several Taliban fighters, and were then attacked by nearly a dozen insurgents in retaliation, with the town's local defence force, supported by the Australians and coalition aircraft, repelling the attack. The operation resulted in the clearance of the town and a number of insurgent casualties.; 10–14 June: Australian Special Forces and Afghan troops conduct an offensive in the Shah Wali Kot district of Kandahar province, resulting in very heavy insurgent casualties, including up to 100 killed in action. The operation occurred in preparation for the coalition clearance of Kandahar and significantly disrupted a major insurgent safe haven. One Australian soldier and one Afghan were wounded in the action. Corporal Ben Roberts-Smith of the Special Air Service Regiment was awarded the Victoria Cross for Australia for his actions during the offensive.; 21 June: Three Australian soldiers of the 2nd Commando Regiment were killed when the US UH-60 Blackhawk helicopter carrying them crashed in northern Kandahar Province. The helicopter's US pilot was also killed, while a US crewman and the other seven Australian commandos aboard were also injured.; 24 August: Australian forces from 1st Mentoring Task Force and Afghan National Army soldiers are involved in intense fighting during a three-hour close quarters battle with Taliban forces in Deh Rahwood, in western Uruzgan during the Battle of Derapet. AH-64 Apache attack helicopters provided close air support before the combined Australian and Afghan patrol broke contact after inflicting heavy casualties on the Taliban who were forced to retreat into the mountains. One Australian, Lance Corporal Jared MacKinney, 28, was killed in the fighting, while a large number of insurgents were known to have been killed.
2011	30 May: An Australian Army CH-47D Chinook helicopter crashed during a resupply operation in Zabul Province, killing one Australian and injuring five others. The Chinook was unable to be recovered, and was subsequently destroyed in place.; 9 September: Australian forces from MTF-3 are heavily engaged during the Battle of Doan.; 30 October: incident in which three Australians were killed as well as an Afghan interpreter and seven injured after an ANA soldier turned his gun against the Australians. This event marked the bloodiest incident for Australian forces in the Afghanistan War, and the worst for the ADF since Vietnam.
2016	The Brereton Report is initiated, which set out to investigate accusations of Australian war crimes in Afghanistan.
2018	13 June: Photographs are leaked to the press depicting Australian soldiers in Afghanistan flying Nazi swastikas on their vehicles. Their actions were subsequently denounced by then Prime Minister Malcolm Turnbull.
2019	Sergeant Kevin Frost, an Australian commando who had told ABC News that he had taken part in covering up Australian military war crimes in Afghanistan, was found dead. He had allegedly committed suicide.

== Cost ==
The cost of operations in Afghanistan has represented the largest operational expenditure by the ADF in most financial years since 2001/02. The yearly expenditure on Afghanistan by the ADF includes the figures below.

Year	2007	2008	2009	2010	2011	2012	2013	2014	2015^{1}	2016^{1}	Total 2007–2016 (A$)
Cost (A$ million)	$575.3	$661	$1381.1	$1100	$1221.8	$1700	$1800			$122	= $8.561 billion

^1 While Operation Slipper ceased on 31 December 2014, funds have been allocated to repair equipment returned to Australia and to contribute to the sustainment of the Afghan National Security Forces.

== See also ==
- Australian Army
- Civilian casualties of the U.S. invasion of Afghanistan
- Coalition casualties in Afghanistan
- International public opinion on the war in Afghanistan
- Taliban insurgency
- Afghan Files (Australia)
- Defence Honours and Awards scandal
