= Tehree Gordon =

Australian animal volunteer

- Born: Tehree Alice Gordon
- Occupation: Animal volunteer

Tehree Alice Gordon is an Australian volunteer who has been working with animals since the 1950s. In 1975, Gordon and her husband established the Jirrahlinga Koala and Wildlife Sanctuary, which was the first koala sanctuary to be established in Victoria. In 2001, Gordon was awarded the Centenary Medal and was named the Senior Australian of the Year in 2004.

== Career ==
In the late 1950s, Gordon began her career working with animals as a volunteer. In 1975, Gordon decided to create an animal sanctuary after becoming the owner of a kangaroo.

That year, Gordon and her husband established the Jirrahlinga Koala and Wildlife Sanctuary at Barwon Heads. At Jirrahlinga, Gordon also took care of pets for elderly and sick owners, and allowed children who have experienced abuse to spend time with the animals.

In 2005, Gordon acquired the Chewton Dingo Farm, after the death of the previous owner, and the Halls Gap Zoo in 2016.

Managing more than one facility eventually became unsustainable. In 2022, the Barwon Heads location was closed and merged with the Chewton dingo facility to create the Jirrahlinga Dingo Conservation and Wildlife Education Centre.

== Personal life ==
Gordon is married to Hamish, who became a co-owner of Jirrahlinga in 1981. In 1998, Gordon was diagnosed with multiple sclerosis.

== Awards and honours ==
In 2001, Gordon was awarded the Centenary Medal for her work in animal welfare. In 2004, Gordon was named the Senior Australian of the Year. In 2012, Gordon and her husband were awarded at the Pride of Australia Awards. In 2017, Gordon was given a lifetime achievement award from Volunteering Victoria.
