= Anne Gardiner =

Anne Marie Gardiner (born 18 June 1931) is a community and heritage advocate living and working on the Tiwi Islands of the Northern Territory of Australia for more than 70 years. She was named the Senior Australian of the Year in 2017.

== Early life ==
Gardiner was born in Gundagai in New South Wales on 18 June 1931. From a farming family, she went to school at the Mercy School of St Stanislaus, completing her education at St Joseph's Boarding College in Albury.

She entered the Order of Our Lady of the Sacred Heart on 31 May 1949, attracted by the opportunity to work with Aboriginal people.

== Contribution to the Northern Territory ==
Gardiner moved to the Bathurst Island in 1953, at 22 years of age. She then taught at St Mary's Primary School from 1966 and Daly River in 1969, returning to Bathurst Island in 1970.

She has spent the 50 of the last 63 years there supporting the Tiwi culture and community. Gardiner retired as principal of the local primary school having taught nearly five generations.

Gardiner has worked with children forming community groups such as mother's clubs, athletics clubs, regular prayer meetings, an opportunity shop and a coffee shop. She has also worked for nearly four decades to establish the Patakajiyali Museum where Tiwi history, culture and language is preserved for future generations.

Gardiner fell ill in 1996 and was airlifted from Bathurst Island to Darwin for treatment. She recovered, but in 1997, Gardiner announced that she was leaving Nguiu, and moving to Broome. She returned to the Tiwi Islands

== Awards ==
Gardiner received the Lyn Powierza Scholarship in 1993 for her contribution to education in the Northern Territory.

Gardiner was appointed a Member of the Order of Australia in 1996, which was presented on Nguiu. Of the experience she said "everyone cried and cried with happiness for me. They are beautiful people to work and live with."

She was then named the Senior Australian of the Year in 2017. She describes the importance of living in the present, that nothing is real unless "you live out your faith".
