= Khas Uruzgan District =

Khas Urozgan ارزگان خاص
- District
- Location within Afghanistan
- Coordinates: 33°00′00″N 66°41′24″E
- Country: Afghanistan
- Province: Urozgan

Khas Uruzgan (Dari: ارزگان خاص, also spelled Khas Urozgan) is a district of Urozgan Province, Afghanistan.

== Government ==
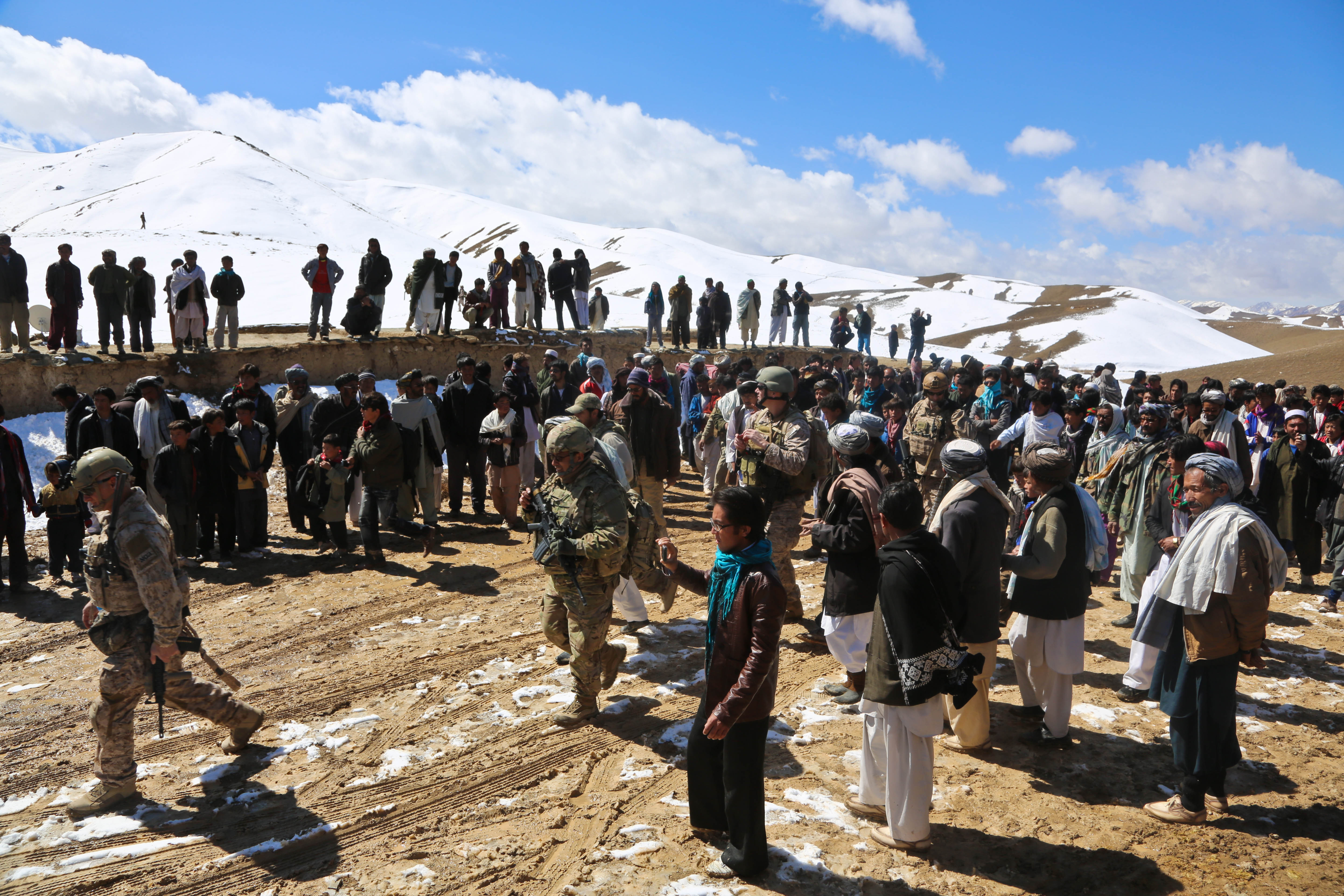
Coalition forces visit the Hazara village Siya Boghal, Khas Uruzgan district

A District Governor, Chief of Police, four-person district council, four-person ulema shura and a two-judge court exist. The district council had eight members until the spring of 2008, when the Taliban threats forced half to quit. In November 2010 more than 300 tribal elders and religious leaders from across the district elected a first-ever district community council.
