= List of Senior Australian of the Year Award recipients =

The Senior Australian of the Year Award is one of the Australian of the Year awards. It commenced in 1999, in the International Year of Older Persons, and recognises those Australians aged 60 and over who continue to achieve and contribute. 2002 is the only year, since the founding of the awards, that a recipient hasn't been certified.

== Recipients ==
Year of award	Name	Comments
1999	Slim Dusty AO, MBE	Country music singer
2000	Freda Briggs AO	Educator, author, scholar and ambassador
2001	Graeme Clark AC	Pioneer of the Bionic Ear
2003	Bruce Campbell MBE	Rural community leader
2004	Tehree Gordon	Community volunteer and wildlife rescuer
2005	Antonio Milhinhos	Philanthropist
2006	Sally Goold OAM	Indigenous nurse and mentor
2007	Brian Egan	Former [Helped farmers in need and in drought]; Founder of Aussie Helpers
2008	David Bussau AM	Finance entrepreneur
2009	Pat LaManna OAM	Entrepreneur and philanthropist
2010	Maggie Beer AM	Cook and restaurateur
2011	Ron McCallum AO	Australian legal academic
2012	Laurie Baymarrwangga	Indigenous community Leader
2013	Ian Maddocks	Palliative care specialist
2014	Fred Chaney AO	Reconciliation advocate
2015	Jackie French AM	Author
2016	Gordian Fulde AO	Emergency healthcare specialist
2017	Anne Gardiner AM	Service to the people of the Tiwi Islands.
2018	Graham Farquhar AO	ACT biophysicist
2019	Suzanne Packer	Advocate for children's rights and child abuse prevention
2020	John Newnham	Obstetrics specialist preventing pre-term birth
2021	Miriam-Rose Ungunmerr-Baumann	Aboriginal activist and educator
2022	Valmai Dempsey	St John Ambulance volunteer (50+ years)
2022	James Goodge	Vinnies volunteer (50+ years)
2023	Tom Calma	Advocate for Voice to parliament
2024	Yalmay Yunupiŋu	Teacher, linguist and community leader
2025	Brother Thomas Oliver Pickett AM	Co-Founder of Wheelchairs for Kids
2026	Henry Brodaty AO	Dementia care pioneer

== See also ==
- List of Australian of the Year Award recipients
- List of Young Australian of the Year Award recipients
- List of Australian Local Hero Award recipients
