= Tim Conolan =

Australian social entrepreneur

Tim Conolan AM is an Australian social entrepreneur who founded TLC for Kids, a non-profit group that supports hospitalized children in Australia.

At the age of 21, Conolan was asked to attend a cancer-support group camp (Canteen) as a motivational speaker with his brother, David. At that camp, Conolan met 17-year-old Francis Stockbridge, who was suffering from lung cancer. That meeting created a connection that was to change the course of Conolan's life. A few days later, Stockbridge called Conolan for support, after being told he had just one month left to live. Relying on life skills, Conolan was able to use motivational techniques to help Stockbridge focus not on the future but on each day. This encounter inspired Conolan to support kids in need.

Tim Conolan AM established TLC for Kids with his long‐term partner, Ana Darras in 1998. TLC for Kids is a not‐for‐profit organisation that provides immediate distraction and practical or emotional support and relief to sick children and their families, during critical times of crisis and hardship, regardless of their illness, condition or background.

Since its inception, the charity's services have been used more than eight million times.

In 2014, Tim was voted Australia’s Local Hero as part of the Australian of the Year Awards. He is an Australia Day Ambassador and also received the 2014 EY Entrepreneur of the Year, Social Entrepreneur, Southern Region Award. In 2019, Tim became a Member of the Order of Australia.

== Awards and nominations ==
- Australia's Local Hero 2014 in Australian Of The Year awards
- EY Entrepreneur Of The Year 2014, Social Entrepreneur, Southern Region
- Member of the Order of Australia (AM) in 2019

== Notable achievements ==
- Published in Who's Who In Australia from 2015 to present
- Australia Day Ambassador 2015 to Present
- Presented a TedX Talk at TedXBondUniversity
- Queens Baton Relay Runner - carried the Queen's Baton for the 2006 Commonwealth Games
- Advisory Board Member of the Melbourne University Health Initiative (MUHI)
- Member of the Australian Institute of Company Directors

== Personal life ==
Conolan's long-time partner in life and TLC for Kids is Ana Darras.
