= List of Australian Local Hero Award recipients =

The Local Hero Award is a part of the Australian of the Year awards. It commenced in 2003 and is sponsored by the Department of Immigration and Citizenship (DIAC).

The Local Hero Award acknowledges extraordinary contributions made by Australians in their local community. A Local Hero from each state and territory is chosen each year, with one of the eight state and territory Local Heroes announced as Australia's Local Hero on Australia Day eve each year.

== List of award recipients ==
Year	Name	Achievement
2003	Brian Perry AFSM	Bushfire fighter
2004	Donna Carson	Survivor of domestic violence
2005	Ben Kearney	Environmental campaigner
2006	Toni Hoffman	Patient advocate
2007	Shanaka Fernando	Social challenger
2008	Jonathon Welch AM	Choral conductor
2009	Graeme Drew	Sea rescuer and educator
2010	Ronni Kahn	Food rescuer
2011	Donald Ritchie OAM	Suicide prevention advocate
2012	Lynne Sawyers	Foster mother
2013	Shane Phillips	Indigenous leader
2014	Tim Conolan	Children's charity founder
2015	Juliette Wright	Social entrepreneur
2016	Dr Catherine Keenan	Youth educator
2017	Vicki Jellie	Campaigned to establish a cancer centre in Warrnambool
2018	Eddie Woo	Sydney maths teacher
2019	Kate and Tick Everett	Campaigned against bullying following daughter's death
2020	Bernie Shakeshaft	Campaigner for disadvantaged rural youth
2021	Rosemary Kariuki	Activist supporting migrant women
2022	Shanna Whan	Alcohol consumption activist in rural Australia
2023	Amar Singh	Founder of Turbans 4 Australia
2024	David Elliott	Co-founder of Australian Age of Dinosaurs and a key figure in boosting the palaeo-tourism industry in Australia.
2025	Vanessa Brettell	Co-founders of a social enterprise for migrant women
2025	Hannah Costello	Co-founders of a social enterprise for migrant women

== See also ==
- List of Australian of the Year Award recipients
- List of Senior Australian of the Year Award recipients
- List of Young Australian of the Year Award recipients
