= List of Young Australian of the Year Award recipients =

The Young Australian of the Year Awards commenced in 1979, and recognises those aged 16 to 30 who are considered exceptional young Australians. 1993 was the only year in which an award was not given.

== Recipients ==
Year of award	Name	Notes
1979	Julie Sochacki	
1980	Peter Hill	Paralympic swimmer and athlete
1981	Paul Radley	Writer
1982	Mark Ella AM	Indigenous former rugby union footballer
1983	Michael Waldock	Volunteer coastguard
1984	Jon Sieben OAM	Swimmer
1985	Deahnne McIntyre OAM	Paralympic athlete and powerlifter
1986	Simone Young AM	Conductor and teacher
1987	Bernadette Harvey	Concert pianist and lecturer
1988	Duncan Armstrong OAM	Olympic swimmer
1989	Brenden Borellini	Artist
1990	Cathy Freeman OAM	Olympic athlete
1991	Simon Fairweather OAM	Archer
1992	Kieren Perkins OAM	Olympic swimmer
1993	No award made: period of award changed from the previous year to the year ahead in 1994; i.e. Kieren Perkins was named Young Australian of the Year for 1992 in 1993 and Anna Bown was named Young Australian of the Year for 1994 in 1994	
1994	Anna Bown	Haematologist
1995	Poppy King	Entrepreneur
1996	Rebecca Chambers	Concert pianist
1997	Nova Peris-Kneebone OAM	Aboriginal athlete and former politician
1998	Tan Le	Telecommunications entrepreneur
1999	Bryan Gaensler	Astronomer
2000	Ian Thorpe OAM	Olympic swimmer
2001	James Fitzpatrick	Paediatrician
2002	Scott Hocknull	Palaeontologist
2003	Lleyton Hewitt AM	Tennis player
2004	Hugh Evans	Humanitarian
2005	Khoa Do	Film director and screenwriter
2006	Trisha Broadbridge	Sports administrator
2007	Tania Major	Aboriginal activist
2008	Casey Stoner AM	Motorcycle racer
2009	Jonty Bush	Politician
2010	Mark Donaldson VC	Soldier
2011	Jessica Watson OAM	Sailor
2012	Marita Cheng AM	Entrepreneur
2013	Akram Azimi	Sociologist and law graduate
2014	Haakon	Paralympic swimmer
2015	Drisana Levitzke-Gray	Disability rights campaigner
2016	Nic Marchesi OAM; Lucas Patchett OAM	Mobile laundry founders
2017	Paul Vasileff	Fashion designer
2018	Samantha Kerr OAM	Soccer player
2019	Danzal Baker	Yolngu rapper, dancer and artist
2020	Ashleigh Barty	Tennis player
2021	Isobel Marshall	Social entrepreneur
2022	Dr Daniel Nour MD	Physician
2023	Awer Mabil	Soccer player
2024	Emma McKeon	Olympic swimmer
2025	Dr Katrina Wruck	Materials scientist and industrial chemist
2026	Nedd Brockmann	Ultramarathon athlete

== See also ==
- List of Australian of the Year Award recipients
- List of Senior Australian of the Year Award recipients
- List of Australian Local Hero Award recipients
