= List of Australian of the Year Award recipients =

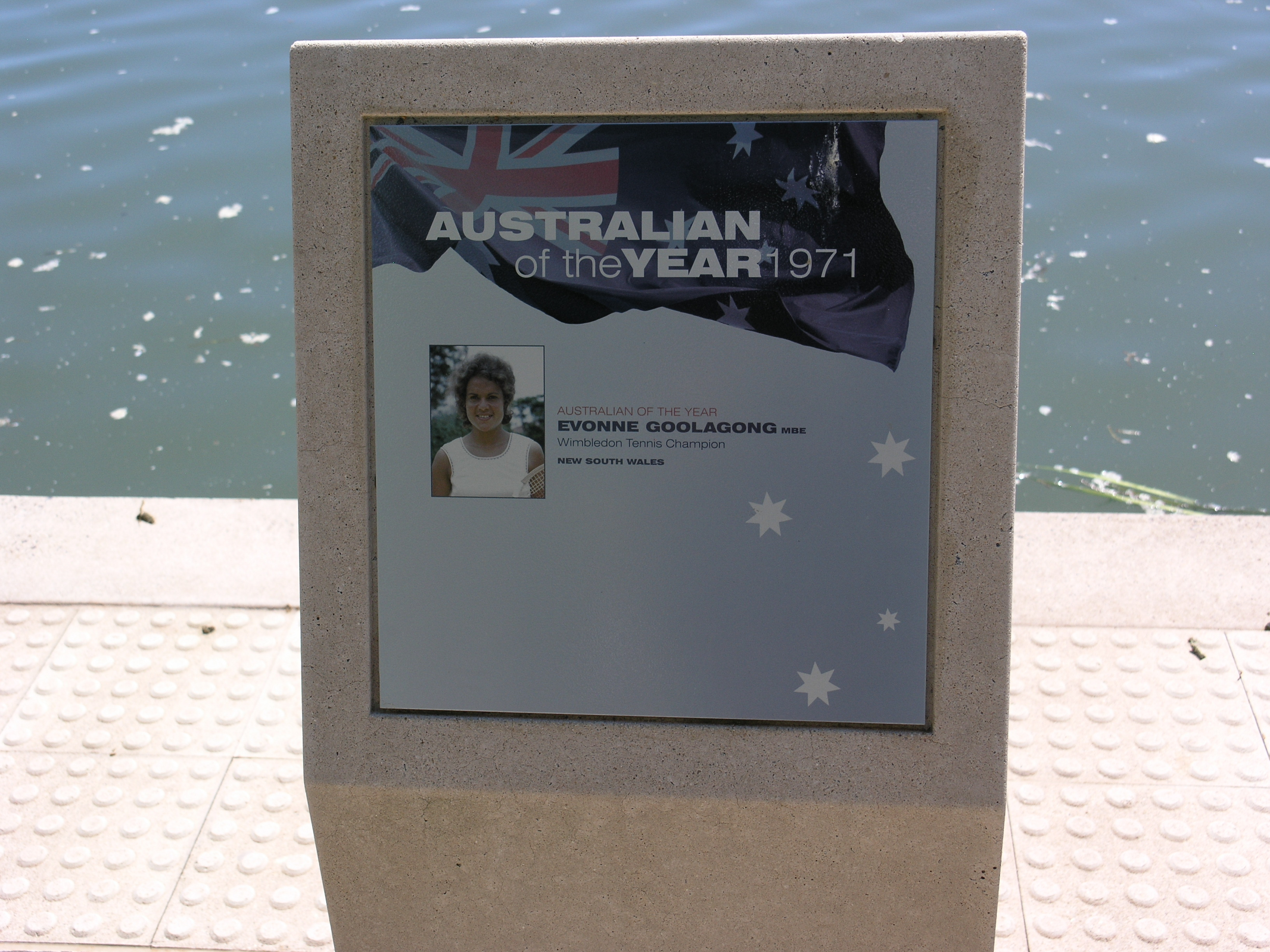
1971 recipient Evonne Goolagong's plaque on the Australians of the Year Walk

The Australian of the Year Award is given annually on Australia Day. The announcement of the award has become a major public event in Australia, and is televised nationwide. The award "offers an insight into Australian identity, reflecting the nation's evolving relationship with world, the role of sport in Australian culture, the impact of multiculturalism, and the special status of Australia's Indigenous people". The award is unique in that it is sponsored by a national government and commands broad public support.

The following is a list of the recipients of the Australian of the Year award.

The post-nominals listed for each individual are as they were on the day they were named the Australian of the Year.

== Recipients ==
Year	Name	Post nominals	Comments	State / Territory	Ref.
1960	Sir Macfarlane Burnet	OM	Virologist; 1960 Nobel Prize in Physiology or Medicine co-recipient	Victoria	
1961	Joan Sutherland	CBE	Opera singer	New South Wales	
1962	Jock Sturrock		Yachtsman	Victoria	
1963	Sir John Eccles		Neurophysiologist; 1963 Nobel Prize in Physiology or Medicine co-recipient	Victoria	
1964	Dawn Fraser		Swimmer; gold medal winner at 1956, 1960 and 1964 Summer Olympic Games	New South Wales	
1965	Robert Helpmann	CBE	Actor; ballet dancer; director	South Australia	
1966	Jack Brabham	OBE	Racing driver; Formula One champion in 1959, 1960 and 1966	New South Wales	
1967	The Seekers		Music group	Victoria	
1968	Lionel Rose	MBE	Boxer; first Indigenous Australian to win a world boxing title (1968)	Victoria	
1969	Lord Casey	GCMG, CH, DSO, MC, PC	Politician, diplomat, Governor-General of Australia (1965–1969)	Queensland	
1970	Cardinal Sir Norman Gilroy	KBE	Clergyman; first Australian-born Cardinal of the Roman Catholic Church	New South Wales	
1971	Evonne Goolagong		Tennis player	New South Wales	
1972	Shane Gould		Swimmer; winner of three gold medals, a silver and bronze in 1972 Summer Olympics	New South Wales	
1973	Patrick White		Author; 1973 Nobel Prize for Literature recipient	New South Wales	
1974	Sir Bernard Heinze		Conductor	Victoria	
1975	John Cornforth	CBE	Scientist; 1975 Nobel Prize in Chemistry recipient	New South Wales	
1975	MAJGEN Alan Stretton	AO, CBE	Australian Army officer; managed Cyclone Tracy cleanup	Victoria	
1976	LTCOL Sir Edward "Weary" Dunlop	CMG, OBE	Military surgeon; World War II prisoner of war	Victoria	
1977	Raigh Roe	CBE	President of the Country Women's Association	Western Australia	
1977	Sir Murray Tyrrell	KCVO, CBE	Official secretary to six governors-general	Victoria	
1978	Alan Bond		Businessman	New South Wales	
1978	Galarrwuy Yunupingu		Indigenous land rights activist	Northern Territory	
1979	Neville Bonner		First Aboriginal person elected to the Parliament of Australia	Queensland	
1979	Harry Butler	OBE	Naturalist	Western Australia	
1980	Manning Clark	AC	Historian	Australian Capital Territory	
1981	Sir John Crawford		Economist	New South Wales	
1982	Sir Edward Williams	KCMG, KBE, QC	Judge of the Supreme Court of Queensland; chairman of the 1982 Brisbane Commonwealth Games Foundation	Queensland	
1983	Robert de Castella	MBE	Marathon runner	Australian Capital Territory	
1984	Lowitja O'Donoghue	CBE	Aboriginal health worker; inaugural chairperson of the Aboriginal and Torres Strait Islander Commission (1990–1996)	South Australia	
1985	Paul Hogan		Actor	New South Wales	
1986	Dick Smith		Entrepreneur	New South Wales	
1987	John Farnham		Singer, entertainer	Victoria	
1988	Kay Cottee		First female sailor to perform a single-handed, non-stop circumnavigation of the world (1988)	New South Wales	
1989	Allan Border	AO	Australian cricket team captain	New South Wales	
1990	Fred Hollows		Ophthalmologist; founder of The Fred Hollows Foundation	New South Wales	
1991	Peter Hollingworth	AO, OBE	Anglican Archbishop of Brisbane; head, Brotherhood of St. Lawrence; governor-general	Victoria	
1992	Mandawuy Yunupingu		Singer, Yothu Yindi	Northern Territory	
1993	No award made: period of award changed from the previous year to the year ahead in 1994.				
1994	Ian Kiernan	OAM	Environmentalist; founder of Clean Up Australia and Clean Up the World	New South Wales	
1995	Arthur Boyd	AC, OBE	Artist	New South Wales	
1996	John Yu	AM	Paediatrician, CEO of the Royal Alexandra Hospital for Children	New South Wales	
1997	Peter Doherty	AC	Veterinarian; immunologist; 1996 Nobel Prize in Physiology or Medicine recipient	Queensland	
1998	Cathy Freeman	OAM	Athlete; also Young Australian of the Year in 1990	Queensland	
1999	Mark Taylor	AO	Australian cricket team captain	New South Wales	
2000	Sir Gustav Nossal	AC, CBE	Biologist	Victoria	
2001	LTGEN Peter Cosgrove	AC, MC	Commander of the International Force for East Timor (1999–2000); Chief of Army (2000–2002); Chief of the Defence Force (2002–2005); Governor-General of Australia (2014–2019)	New South Wales	
2002	Pat Rafter		Tennis player	Queensland	
2003	Fiona Stanley	AC	Epidemiologist	Western Australia	
2004	Steve Waugh	AO	Australian cricket team captain and humanitarian	New South Wales	
2005	Fiona Wood	AM	Plastic surgeon; worked with victims of the 2002 Bali bombings	Western Australia	
2006	Ian Frazer		Immunologist	Queensland	
2007	Tim Flannery		Scientist; global warming activist	New South Wales	
2008	Lee Kernaghan	OAM	Singer	Queensland	
2009	Mick Dodson	AM	Indigenous leader	Australian Capital Territory	
2010	Patrick McGorry	AO	Psychiatrist	Victoria	
2011	Simon McKeon	AO	Philanthropist businessman	Victoria	
2012	Geoffrey Rush	AC	Actor and film producer	Victoria	
2013	Ita Buttrose	AO, OBE	Journalist and businesswoman, founding editor of Cleo	New South Wales	
2014	Adam Goodes		Australian rules footballer and Indigenous community leader	New South Wales	
2015	Rosie Batty		Domestic violence campaigner	Victoria	
2016	LTGEN David Morrison	AO	Commitment to gender equality, diversity and inclusion	Australian Capital Territory	
2017	Alan Mackay-Sim		Biomedical scientist treating spinal cord injuries	Queensland	
2018	Michelle Simmons		Scientia professor of quantum physics in the faculty of science at the University of New South Wales	New South Wales	
2019	Craig Challen	SC, OAM	Cave divers who participated in the Tham Luang cave rescue	South Australia	
2019	Richard Harris	SC, OAM	Cave divers who participated in the Tham Luang cave rescue	South Australia	
2020	Dr James Muecke	AM	Eye surgeon and founder of Sight for All	South Australia	
2021	Grace Tame		Advocate for survivors of sexual assault	Tasmania	
2022	Dylan Alcott	AO	Paralympic athlete, advocate for disability	Victoria	
2023	Taryn Brumfitt		Positive body image advocate and founder of the Body Image Movement	South Australia	
2024	Georgina Long	AO	Melanoma researchers	New South Wales	
2024	Richard Scolyer	AO	Melanoma researchers	New South Wales	
2025	Neale Daniher	AO	Former Australian rules footballer and coach; charity co-founder, advocate for motor neurone disease research	Victoria	
2026	Katherine Bennell-Pegg		Australian space engineer and qualified astronaut	South Australia	

== See also ==
- List of Senior Australian of the Year Award recipients
- List of Young Australian of the Year Award recipients
- List of Australian Local Hero Award recipients
- List of South Australian of the Year Award recipients
- List of Queensland Australian of the Year award recipients
