= Raigh =

Raigh may refer to:

- Raigh, the younger twin brother of Lugh's and one of the son of Nino's and the playable character from Fire Emblem: The Binding Blade
- Raigh Roe (1922–2014), female Western Australian State President
- Raigh (County Galway), one of the townland of County Galway
- Raigh (County Mayo), one of the townland of County Mayo
