= David Smith (public servant) =

Australian public servant (1933–2022)

Sir David Smith KCVO, AO

6th Official Secretary to the Governor-General of Australia
- In office 30 January 1973 –: 1 September 1990; Acting: 30 January 1973 – 20 July 1973
- Monarch: Elizabeth II
- Governors-General: Sir Paul Hasluck (1973–74); Sir John Kerr (1974–77); Sir Zelman Cowen (1977–82); Sir Ninian Stephen (1982–89); Bill Hayden (1989–90)
- Preceded by: Sir Murray Tyrrell
- Succeeded by: Douglas Sturkey

Personal details
- Born: David Iser Szmitkowski; 9 August 1933 Melbourne, Victoria, Australia
- Died: 15 August 2022 (aged 89) Canberra, Australian Capital Territory
- Spouse: June Francis Forestier (m. 1955)
- Children: 3
- Education: University of Melbourne; Australian National University

Sir David Iser Smith (9 August 1933 – 15 August 2022) was an Australian public servant. He was the Official Secretary to the Governor-General of Australia between 1973 and 1990, in which capacity he served Sir Paul Hasluck, Sir John Kerr, Sir Zelman Cowen, Sir Ninian Stephen and Bill Hayden.

== Early life ==
Smith was born in Melbourne to Polish Jewish immigrant parents named Szmitkowski which was then anglicised to "Smith". He was educated at Princes Hill State School, Scotch College, the University of Melbourne, and the Australian National University, where he gained a Bachelor of Arts degree.

Smith began his career in the Australian Public Service in 1953, and was later appointed Private Secretary to the Minister for Interior and Works from 1958 until 1963. He was then appointed Secretary to the Federal Executive Council and head of the Government Branch, Department of the Prime Minister and Cabinet, from 1971 to 1973.

== Secretary to the Governor-General ==
In January 1973, Smith was appointed acting Official Secretary to Sir Paul Hasluck, and on 20 July was made permanent Official Secretary. He later became the first Secretary of the Order of Australia on its establishment in 1975. After Hasluck's retirement, he served Sir John Kerr.

Smith held office at the time of the 1975 Australian constitutional crisis when, on 11 November 1975, Kerr dismissed the Prime Minister, Gough Whitlam. Smith was required to read out the proclamation of the dissolution of parliament, in formal dress, on the steps of the then Parliament House. The dismissal was by then publicly known, and an angry crowd of Whitlam supporters had gathered, filling the steps and spilling over into the roadway and Parliament House itself. Smith was forced to enter Parliament House through a side door and make his way to the steps from the inside. He read the proclamation, although the crowd's boos and chanting ("We want Gough!") drowned him out. It ended:

Now therefore I, Sir John Robert Kerr, the Governor-General of Australia, do by this my Proclamation dissolve the Senate and the House of Representatives. Given under my Hand and the Great Seal of Australia on 11 November 1975. By His Excellency's Command,
Malcolm Fraser Prime Minister, John R. Kerr, Governor General.
God Save The Queen!

Whitlam, who had been standing on the step behind Smith, immediately addressed the gathered media scrum and crowd with words that famously proclaimed his defiance:

Well may we say God Save the Queen because nothing will save the Governor-General. The proclamation which you have just heard read by the Governor-General's official secretary was countersigned "Malcolm Fraser", who will undoubtedly go down in Australian history from Remembrance Day 1975 as Kerr's cur....

Smith served as Official Secretary until 1990, serving Sir Zelman Cowen, Sir Ninian Stephen, and Bill Hayden. He was later appointed a Visiting Fellow in the Faculty of Law at the Australian National University for 1998 and 1999, and was a member of the 1998 Constitutional Convention.

== Views on the monarchy and Whitlam's dismissal ==
In a lecture on "An Australian Head of State: An Historical and Contemporary Perspective", published as Papers on Parliament No. 27, March 1996, Smith mentioned that, in a previous lecture, Senator Baden Teague had spoken of the Queen as Australia's head of state and argued for her replacement by an Australian head of state, and that in his replies to questions after the lecture Teague had spoken of the Governor-General as "our head of state". Smith remarked that the switch from Queen to Governor‑General was "entirely automatic and unselfconscious", and that Teague was "not alone in his ambivalence". After mentioning other public references made to the Governor-General as head of state, Smith opined "The fact is that under our Constitution we have two heads of state—a symbolic head of state in the Sovereign, and a constitutional head of state in the Governor-General", and said that in his lecture he would discuss the roles of the Sovereign and of the Governor-General under the Australian Constitution, including some of the changes which had occurred in each of those roles since Federation. To conclude the lecture, Smith quoted the remarks of Sir Gerard Brennan, Chief Justice of Australia, on the oaths of allegiance and office:

The first promise is a commitment of loyalty to Her Majesty the Queen, her heirs and successors according to law. It is a commitment to the head of State under the Constitution. It is from the Constitution that the Oath of Allegiance, which has its origins in feudal England, takes its significance in the present day. As the Constitution can now be abrogated or amended only by the Australian people in whom, therefore, the ultimate sovereignty of the nation resides, the Oath of Allegiance and the undertaking to serve the head of State as Chief Justice are a promise of fidelity and service to the Australian people. The duties which the oath imposes sit lightly on a citizen of the nation which the Constitution summoned into being and which it sustains. Allegiance to a young, free and confident nation, governed by the rule of law, is not a burden but a privilege.

— David Smith, spoken at a ceremonial sitting of the High Court on 21 April 1995

After retiring from public service, Sir David became a member of Australians for Constitutional Monarchy and frequently gave addresses on constitutional matters. He strongly defended Sir John Kerr and was highly critical of Gough Whitlam. In 2005 Smith published an account of the events of 1975 and the other constitutional debates, Head of State, which was launched by former Governor-General Bill Hayden. Smith later published his opinion that the dismissal had been the culmination of a political and not a constitutional crisis.

== Governor-General as head of state ==
After his retirement in 1992, Smith asserted in books and lectures that the governor-general carries out the duties of head of state in his or her own right and not as the Queen's representative or surrogate.

== Life in retirement; death ==
Smith lived in Canberra, where in a voluntary capacity he often led guided tours at Old Parliament House. He was father to three sons, Michael (financial services, Sydney), Richard (Commonwealth public servant, Canberra), Phillip (strategic architect, ICT, Oslo, Norway).

David Smith died on 15 August 2022 at the age of 89.

== Honours ==
- On 29 April 1977, Smith was made a Commander of the Royal Victorian Order (CVO) for his continuing service as Official Secretary.
- On 9 June 1986, he was appointed an Officer of the Order of Australia (AO) for "service to the Crown, as Official Secretary to the Governor-General and as Secretary of the Order of Australia".
- On 19 August 1990, he was appointed a Knight Commander of the Royal Victorian Order (KCVO) at a private investiture at Balmoral Castle.
- On 1 January 2001 he was awarded the Centenary Medal for "services to Australian society through the Office of the Governor-General".

Smith was also appointed a Knight of the Order of St John and has been awarded the Queen Elizabeth II Silver Jubilee Medal.

== See also ==
- David Smith, a Western Australian politician (born 1943)
- Australian head of state
- 1975 Australian constitutional crisis

Government offices
Preceded by Sir Murray Tyrrell	Official Secretary to the Governor-General of Australia; 1973–1990	Succeeded by Douglas Sturkey
