= John Henry Starling =

Official secretary to the Governor General of Australia (1883–1966)

John Starling CMG OBE

2nd Official Secretary to the Governor-General of Australia
- In office 12 June 1919 – 15 March 1928
- Monarch: George V
- Governors-General: Sir Munro Ferguson; Lord Forster; Lord Stonehaven
- Preceded by: Sir George Steward
- Succeeded by: Sir Leighton Bracegirdle

Personal details
- Born: John Henry Starling; 15 January 1883 Greensborough, Victoria, Australia
- Died: 5 April 1966 (aged 83) Canberra, Australian Capital Territory, Australia
- Spouse: Sarah Elizabeth May Price (m. 1911)
- Occupation: Public servant

John Henry Starling (15 January 1883 – 5 April 1966) was the official secretary to the Governor-General of Australia from 1919 to 1927, serving Sir Ronald Munro Ferguson, Lord Forster and Lord Stonehaven.

== Career ==
Having originally lived in Melbourne, Starling transferred to the Commonwealth Public Service in 1902 as a clerk in the Governor General's office.

Starling transferred to the newly established Prime Minister's Department in February 1912 and was appointed chief clerk in September 1917. In June 1919 he succeeded (Sir) George Steward as official secretary to the governor-general and secretary to the Federal Executive Council. Starling was appointed an Officer of the Order of the British Empire (OBE) in 1920 and a Companion of the Order of St Michael and St George (CMG) in the 1925 Birthday Honours. After the position of official secretary was abolished in 1927, he continued as secretary to the Federal Executive Council until 1933, and in July 1929 he was promoted to assistant secretary of the department's territories branch. In 1933 to 1935, he was secretary to the Prime Minister's Department and secretary to the Department of External Affairs.

== Personal life ==
Starling married Sarah Elizabeth May Price on 15 February 1911. Starling died in Canberra Community Hospital on 5 April 1966 and was cremated. He left behind two sons and a daughter.

Government offices
Preceded by John McLaren	Secretary of the Department of External Affairs; 1933–1935	Succeeded by William Hodgson
Preceded by John McLaren	Secretary of the Prime Minister's Department; 1933–1935	Succeeded by Frank Strahan
