= Leighton Bracegirdle =

Australian rear admiral (1881–1970)

Rear Admiral Sir Leighton Bracegirdle KCVO, CMG, DSO
- Commander Leighton Bracegirdle c. 1918

3rd Official Secretary to the Governor-General of Australia
- In office 1931–1947
- Monarchs: George V Edward VIII; George VI
- Governors-General: Sir Isaac Isaacs; The Earl of Gowrie; The Duke of Gloucester; Sir William McKell
- Preceded by: John Starling
- Succeeded by: Sir Murray Tyrrell

Personal details
- Born: 31 May 1881 Balmain, New South Wales
- Died: 23 March 1970 (aged 88) Sydney, New South Wales
- Nickname: "Brace"

Military service
- Allegiance: Australia
- Branch/service: Royal Australian Navy
- Years of service: 1898–1945
- Rank: Rear Admiral
- Commands: Director of Naval Reserves (1923–31); Royal Australian Navy Bridging Train (1915–17)
- Battles/wars: Boxer Rebellion; Second Boer War; First World War; Asian and Pacific theatre; Gallipoli Campaign; Sinai and Palestine Campaign; Second World War
- Awards: Knight Commander of the Royal Victorian Order; Companion of the Order of St Michael and St George; Distinguished Service Order; Mentioned in Despatches (3)

Rear Admiral Sir Leighton Seymour Bracegirdle, KCVO, CMG, DSO (31 May 1881 – 23 March 1970) was an Australian naval officer and an Official Secretary to four Australian governors-general: Sir Isaac Isaacs, Lord Gowrie, the Duke of Gloucester, and William McKell.

== Early life ==
Leighton Seymour Bracegirdle was born in Balmain, Sydney, on 31 May 1881. He attended Sydney Boys High School, in 1898 he joined the New South Wales Naval Brigade as a cadet. Two years later he became a midshipman and served with the New South Wales contingent in China during the Boxer Rebellion.

Bracegirdle then served as a lieutenant in the South African Irregular Horse in the final year of the Boer War. He returned to Australia after being wounded and continued to serve in the naval militia while working as a clerk. He married Lillian Saunders in 1910 and in 1911 joined the Royal Australian Navy as a lieutenant, serving as District Officer in Newcastle until the beginning of the First World War.

== First World War ==
In August 1914, Bracegirdle enlisted in the Australian Naval and Military Expeditionary Force, serving as a staff officer in German New Guinea until the force was disbanded in February 1915. That month he was appointed commander of the 1st Royal Australian Naval Bridging Train and was sent to Gallipoli to prepare for the British landings at Suvla Bay in August 1915. His unit performed well under relentless shrapnel fire and remained at Suvla, where Bracegirdle was wounded, until the end of the campaign. Having constructed the piers used during the British landing, the bridging train carried out maintenance duties; assisted with the landing of troops, stores, and ammunition; and finally assisted with the evacuation in December.

After a period in hospital suffering from jaundice and malaria, Bracegirdle returned to his unit, which was now working on the Suez Canal. Bracegirdle was awarded the Distinguished Service Order in June 1916 and received his third Mention in Despatches in July of that year. The bridging train remained in the Middle East, assisting with the Allied advance across the Sinai by landing stores on the Mediterranean coast, but was disbanded at the beginning of 1917. Bracegirdle's command ended in March and he returned to Australia having been promoted to commander.

== Post-war and Official Secretary ==
Between 1918 and 1921, Bracegirdle was a District Naval Officer in Adelaide. This was followed by a similar posting in Sydney, which he held until 1923, when he was appointed Director of Naval Reserves. In 1924 he received another promotion, to captain.

Bracegirdle was appointed Military and Official Secretary to the Governor-General in 1931. His posting spanned the tenure of three governors-general (Sir Isaac Isaacs, Lord Gowrie, and the Duke of Gloucester).

After a couple of extensions his retirement was overdue, and he planned to retire when the Duke of Gloucester returned to Britain in mid-January 1947. He remained at his post, however, to assist the Administrator of the Commonwealth Sir Winston Dugan while a replacement Official Secretary was found. (The post was offered to two other serving officers, who both declined because the salary was too low.) Shortly after William McKell became Governor-General, Murray Tyrrell accepted the position in March 1947. Bracegirdle retired from the Navy having attained the rank of rear admiral. After his retirement, he worked for BHP and held directorships in several other companies. He died on 23 March 1970 in Sydney.

Government offices
Vacant Title last held by John Starling in 1927	Official Secretary to the Governor-General of Australia; 1931–1947	Succeeded by Sir Murray Tyrrell
