= Paul Hasluck =

Australian politician (1905–1993)

The Right Honourable Sir Paul Hasluck KG GCMG GCVO
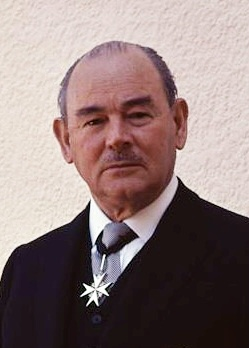
- Hasluck in 1971

17th Governor-General of Australia
- In office 30 April 1969 – 11 July 1974
- Monarch: Elizabeth II
- Prime Minister: John Gorton; William McMahon; Gough Whitlam
- Preceded by: The Lord Casey
- Succeeded by: Sir John Kerr

Minister for External Affairs
- In office 24 April 1964 – 11 February 1969
- Prime Minister: Robert Menzies; Harold Holt; John McEwen; John Gorton
- Preceded by: Garfield Barwick
- Succeeded by: Gordon Freeth

Minister for Defence
- In office 18 December 1963 – 24 April 1964
- Prime Minister: Robert Menzies
- Preceded by: Athol Townley
- Succeeded by: Shane Paltridge

Minister for Territories
- In office 11 May 1951 – 18 December 1963
- Prime Minister: Robert Menzies
- Preceded by: Richard Casey
- Succeeded by: Charles Barnes

Member of the Australian Parliament for Curtin
- In office 10 December 1949 – 10 February 1969
- Preceded by: Division created
- Succeeded by: Victor Garland

Personal details
- Born: Paul Meernaa Caedwalla Hasluck; 1 April 1905 Fremantle, Western Australia, Australia
- Died: 9 January 1993 (aged 87) Dalkeith, Western Australia, Australia
- Resting place: Karrakatta Cemetery
- Party: Liberal Party of Australia
- Spouse: Alexandra Darker (m. 1932)

Sir Paul Meernaa Caedwalla Hasluck (1 April 1905 – 9 January 1993) was an Australian statesman who served as the 17th governor-general of Australia, in office from 1969 to 1974. Prior to that, he was a Liberal Party politician, holding ministerial office continuously from 1951 to 1969.

Hasluck was born in Fremantle, Western Australia, and attended Perth Modern School and the University of Western Australia. After graduation he joined the university as a faculty member, eventually becoming a reader in history. Hasluck joined the Department of External Affairs during World War II, and served as Australia's first Permanent Representative to the United Nations from 1946 to 1947. He would later contribute two volumes to Australia in the War of 1939–1945, the official history of Australia's involvement in the war.

In 1949, Hasluck was elected to federal parliament for the Liberal Party, winning the Division of Curtin. In 1951, less than two years after entering politics, he was made Minister for Territories in the Menzies government. In his twelve years in the position, he initiated transitions toward self-government in Australia's territories, including Nauru, Papua New Guinea, and the Northern Territory.

Following the re-election of the Menzies in 1963, Hasluck was appointed Minister for Defence. In April 1964 he was appointed Minister for External Affairs. His tenure in those positions covered Australia's involvement in the Indonesia–Malaysia confrontation and the first years of the Vietnam War.

After the disappearance of Harold Holt, Hasluck unsuccessfully stood in the resulting Liberal leadership election. He initially stayed on in cabinet under the new prime minister, John Gorton, but in 1969 Gorton instead nominated him to replace Lord Casey as governor-general. In his five years in the position, Hasluck saw two previous political adversaries (William McMahon and Gough Whitlam) become prime minister; he maintained good working relationships with both. In retirement, he was a prolific author, publishing an autobiography, several volumes of poetry, and multiple works on Australian history.

== Early life and education ==
Paul Meernaa Caedwalla Hasluck was born on 1 April 1905 in Fremantle, Western Australia, one of five children born to Patience Eliza (née Wooler) and E'thel Meernaa Caedwalla Hasluck. His father was born in England and arrived in Australia in 1876 as a small child. He obtained a position in the colonial postal service and was postmaster in Coolgardie and on the Great Southern Railway, but later resigned to work full-time for the Salvation Army. His mother was born in England and came to Western Australia to work as a domestic servant, also becoming a devout Salvationist, where she met her future husband.

Hasluck grew up in relative poverty, with the family often in financial distress as his parents undertook full-time missionary work. He had a "strict religious upbringing" in line with the beliefs and tenets of the Salvation Army, but became estranged from the movement at a young age. As a small child Hasluck spent periods in North Fremantle and in locations around regional Western Australia, including York, Kalgoorlie and Collie. The family lived in Collie for four years, where Hasluck's father ran a boys' home for child migrants, before moving back to Perth in 1916 where he ran the Aged Men's Retreat at Guildford.

After a brief period at the Guildford State School, Hasluck won a scholarship to Perth Modern School, which he attended between 1918 and 1922. He was president of the school debating society but later recalled that he lacked in confidence and did not consider going on to further studies. He eventually enrolled in the University of Western Australia (UWA) six years after leaving school, completing a diploma in journalism on a part-time basis in 1932 and graduating Bachelor of Arts in 1937.

== Journalism and academia ==
In 1922, after leaving school, Hasluck joined the staff of The West Australian as a probationary cadet. He was offered a full-time position in 1925 and covered a wide range of areas, including court and police reporting, sporting events, finance and drama and politics. He was eventually placed in charge of the newspaper's press gallery staff at Parliament House and wrote a weekly political column covering state politics. He cultivated a close relationship with the Perth Trades Hall and the union movement, developing a friendship with Westralian Worker editor and future prime minister John Curtin.

While at The West Australian, Hasluck also began to publish articles (in that journal and elsewhere) on the history of the state. After he had obtained his MA, he worked as a tutor in the UWA's history department, and in 1939 he was promoted to a lectureship in history. By that time he had been married for seven years to Alexandra Darker (1908–1993), with whom he had two sons. Alexandra Hasluck became a distinguished writer and historian in her own right, and was the first woman to be appointed a Dame of the Order of Australia. Also in 1939, Hasluck established Freshwater Bay Press, through which he released his first book, Into the Desert. The advent of the Second World War, however, saw the publishing company go into hiatus. The Freshwater Bay Press was later revived by his son Nicholas, and among its subsequent publications it issued a second book of Paul Hasluck's poetry, Dark Cottage in 1984.

In 1941 Hasluck was recruited to the staff of the Department of External Affairs (it acquired the name "Foreign Affairs" only in 1970), and served on Australian delegations to several international conferences, including the San Francisco Conference which founded the United Nations. Here he came into close contact with the Minister for External Affairs in the Labor government, H.V. Evatt, towards whom he conceived a permanent aversion, fully reciprocated by Evatt's attitude to him.

After the war Hasluck returned to UWA as a Reader in History, and was commissioned to write two volumes of Australia in the War of 1939–1945, a 22-volume official history of Australia's involvement in World War II. These volumes were published as The Government and the People 1939–1941 in 1951 and The Government and the People 1941–1945 in 1970. This work was interrupted by his decision to enter politics, a decision motivated partly by his disapproval of Evatt's foreign policy.

== Political career ==
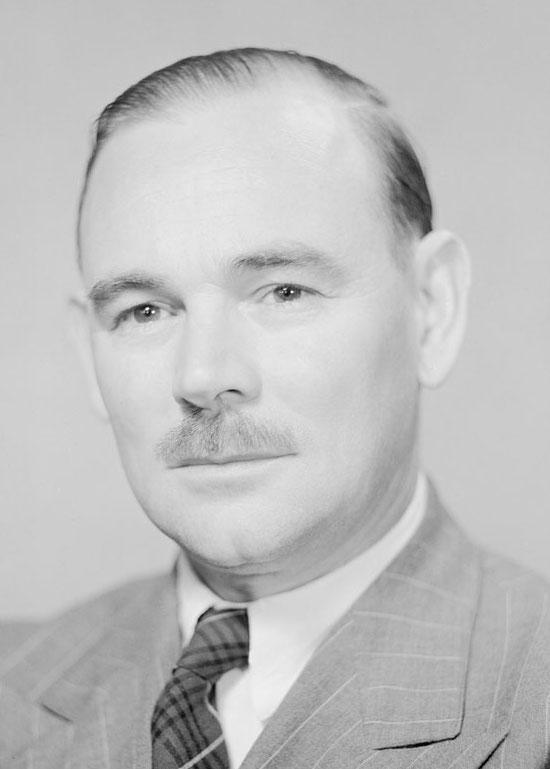
Hasluck in 1953

At the 1949 election Hasluck won Liberal preselection for the newly created Perth-area seat of Curtin. Although it was notionally a Labor seat, it was located in natural Liberal territory in Perth's wealthy beachside suburbs, and Hasluck won it with a resounding swing of almost 14 percent as part of the Coalition's large victory that year.

=== Minister for Territories ===
In 1951, Prime Minister, Robert Menzies appointed Hasluck as Minister for Territories, a post that he held for twelve years. It gave him responsibility for Australia's colonial possession, Papua New Guinea, and also the Northern Territory, home to Australia's largest population of Aboriginal Australians.

Michael Somare, who became Papua New Guinea's first Prime Minister, said that his country had been able to enter self-government without fear of having to argue with an Ian Smith "simply because of Paul Hasluck".

==== Aboriginal welfare ====
Hasluck instigated a new policy towards Aboriginal people, who had until this time been kept separated from the White population of the NT in Aboriginal reserves. He was responsible for the drafting of the bill that became the Welfare Ordinance 1953, which superseded the previous legislation controlling the lives of Aboriginal people in the Northern Territory, the Aboriginals Ordinance 1918. There was no explicit reference to race in the Welfare Ordinance, but it made Aboriginal people wards of the state. Wards were defined as those who did not have the right to vote, which only applied to Aboriginal people, and also implemented a policy of cultural assimilation. Hasluck appointed Harry Giese as Director of Welfare, who also supported the government's expansion of commercial activity in Arnhem Land.

==== Gove Peninsula bauxite mining ====
In 1952, after geological exploration was carried out on the Gove Peninsula in Arnhem Land, NT, discovering large deposits of bauxite, Hasluck announced a change in policy, to allow mining there. In 1958, the Comalco was issued a mining lease to prospect land at Melville Bay, adjacent to Yirrkala mission. In 1960, the mining lease had been transferred to the British Aluminium Company. Hasluck granted additional prospecting rights to Duval Holdings, which then brought in French company Pechiney, which created an Australian subsidiary, GOMINCO, who were granted three new leases to the area around the mission, encroaching on its land. After GOMINCO started staking out its claims around the Yirrkala mission in early 1963, the Gumatj and Rirratjiŋu clans of Yolngu peoples challenged the development, as they had not been consulted. This led to the creation of the Yirrkala bark petitions, two of which were presented to Parliament in August 1963. The petitions asked for the right to use the land over which they had had sovereignty for thousands of years. Hasluck moved for rejection of the first petition. He argued that outside influences (including "Communists down south") had influenced the Yirrkala people. His aims had been publicly endorsed by Cecil Gribble, a senior Methodist minister who lived in Sydney, who had signed off on SML1 in 1958, but fiercely opposed by Yirrkala mission superintendent Edgar Wells, who had come to know the mission residents very well. Hasluck's dismissal of the petition was strongly criticised by Labor politician Gordon Bryant. After the second petition was presented, a select committee was formed to investigate the Yolngu's grievances, which recommended that their sacred sites be protected, as well as giving compensation and land. However, this was not satisfactorily fulfilled, leading to the 1971 Gove Land Rights Case.

=== Defence and External Affairs ===
On 18 December 1963, Hasluck moved on to more senior ministries, and Charles Barnes, of the Country Party, was appointed Minister for Territories by Menzies.

Hasluck was briefly Minister for Defence (18 December 1963 – 24 April 1964), and then became Minister for External Affairs (24 April 1964 – 11 February 1969). He held the office during the height of Australia's commitment to the Vietnam War, of which he was a passionate supporter. He worked to strengthen Australia's relationship with the United States and with anti-Communist governments in South-East Asia, and opposed Australian recognition of the People's Republic of China.

=== Leadership candidate ===
When Prime Minister Harold Holt disappeared in December 1967 and was presumed to have drowned, Hasluck was determined that Treasurer, William McMahon, of whom he had a very low opinion, should not become prime minister. Although he had no great ambitions for himself, Hasluck put his name forward mainly to provide an alternative to McMahon. In the event, McMahon did not stand, as the interim prime minister, John McEwen, had advised his Country Party would not serve in any government headed by McMahon. The choice was between Hasluck, John Gorton, Billy Snedden, and Les Bury, but the last two were never considered serious contenders. Many Liberal MPs saw Hasluck as too old at 64, too conservative and insufficiently telegenic to compete with the Labor leader, Gough Whitlam. Accordingly, they chose the younger and more aggressive Gorton.

== Governor-General ==
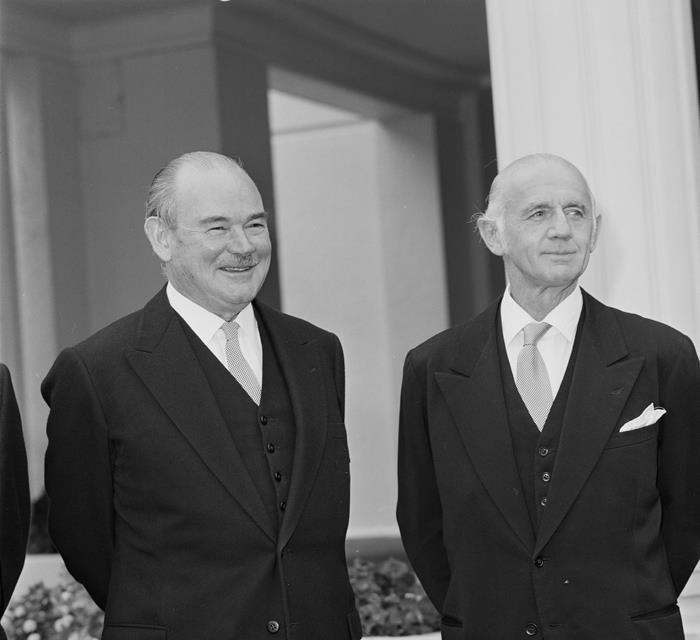
Hasluck with Prime Minister William McMahon on 22 March 1971. The two were never close

In early 1969, Gorton offered Hasluck the post of Governor-General, which he accepted. Reportedly, Gorton was uncomfortable having a potential leadership rival in Cabinet. Hasluck resigned from Parliament on 10 February 1969, being the first Western Australian member of the House of Representatives to resign. He was sworn in as Governor-General on 30 April 1969. That may have cost Hasluck a second opportunity to become prime minister. Gorton resigned in 1971, and the Liberals might well have turned to Hasluck instead of McMahon if he had still been available.

At the 1972 election, Whitlam defeated McMahon and became prime minister. That created a potentially-awkward situation since Whitlam and Hasluck had bitterly resented one another for years. In a celebrated incident in the House of Representatives in 1965, Whitlam had thrown a glass of water at Hasluck after Hasluck had said, "You are one of the filthiest objects ever to come into this chamber". Nevertheless, Hasluck and Whitlam treated each other with complete civility, which soon became genuine mutual respect. They had no difficulties in their formal dealings.

An indication of the change that had taken place occurred soon after Whitlam's victory. Normal practice called for McMahon to stay on as caretaker prime minister until Labor could choose a full ministry at its first caucus meeting. However, Whitlam was unwilling to wait that long and asked Hasluck to have Whitlam and his deputy leader, Lance Barnard, sworn in as an interim two-man government once Labor's victory was beyond doubt. Hasluck promptly agreed, and Whitlam and Barnard held 27 portfolios between them until the full Labor ministry was sworn in.

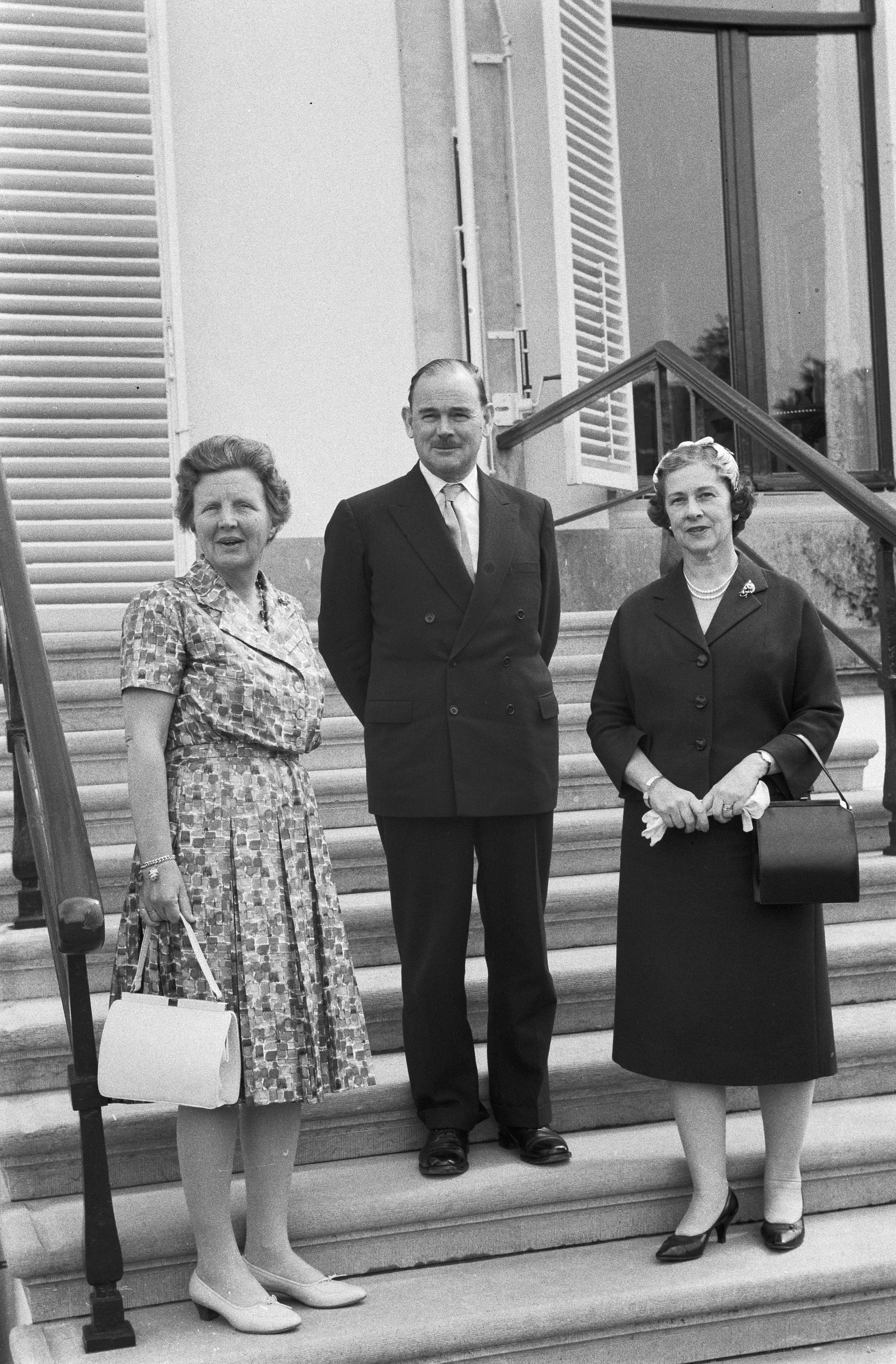
Sir Paul and Lady Hasluck with Queen Juliana of the Netherlands (right), Utrecht, 25 May 1960

In 1973, Hasluck's Official Secretary, Sir Murray Tyrrell, retired after a career during which he had served six governors-general over 26 years. He was succeeded by David Smith.

Hasluck granted Whitlam a double dissolution in April 1974 (with an election on 18 May) when the Liberal Opposition threatened to block the Budget bills in the Senate. Hasluck's term as Governor-General was due to expire in July 1974. Whitlam had offered to extend his term, but Hasluck declined, citing his wife's refusal to remain at Yarralumla longer than the originally-agreed five years.

Hasluck's last official act as Governor-General was to open the 29th Parliament on 9 July 1974. Two days later, his successor, Sir John Kerr, was sworn in.

== Later life, death and legacy ==
Hasluck retired to Perth, where he remained active in cultural and political affairs until his death on 9 January 1993. He was buried at Karrakatta Cemetery.

Historians of the period are certain that, if Hasluck had still been Governor-General in 1975, the constitutional crisis of that year would have ended differently. Hasluck himself implied this in his 1979 book, The Office of Governor-General, and also in the Queale Lecture. He was even more explicit in his 1985 interview with Clyde Cameron for the National Library of Australia's Oral History series, which was not released until 2010. He said he doubted he would have discussed with anyone but Whitlam about the Senate's 1975 refusal to approve Supply. He also argued that Kerr erred in taking advice from Malcolm Fraser prior to appointing him as prime minister. In Hasluck's view, "the function of the governor-general is not to be the honest broker in political situations".

After Hasluck's death, his son Nicholas Hasluck published a selection of his father's private journals and notebooks, under the title The Chance of Politics, in 1997. This book contained a number of highly critical comments, both political and personal, about many of Paul Hasluck's contemporaries. The publication of this material caused considerable offence to some people. Others saw the comments as useful historical information.

Set into the footpath along St Georges Terrace, Perth are 150 bronze tablets commemorating notable figures in Western Australia's history, completed as part of WAY 1979. One of the tablets is devoted to Hasluck.

His heraldic banner as Knight Companion of the Garter, from St George's Chapel, Windsor Castle, probably the only one in Australia, was hung in the south transept of St George's Cathedral, Perth, in 1995. The Catherine wheels on the banner were taken from the Armorial Bearings granted to him by the College of Arms. The crest beneath the banner includes the seven-pointed Australian Commonwealth Star and a formalised representation of West Australian Xanthorrhoea.

== Other activities ==
Hasluck not only reviewed plays during his time at The West Australian, but also acted and directed several stage performances between 1929 and 1944. He also wrote a play called A Game of Billiards, which was published in The Black Swan: The Magazine of the Guild of Undergraduates of the University of Western Australia in 1931, but also performed in Sydney's Aeolian Hall on 13 April 1932.

== Recognition and honours ==
Hasluck was appointed a Privy Counsellor in 1966.

On 21 February 1969, as Governor-General-designate, he was appointed a Knight Grand Cross of the Order of St Michael and St George (GCMG).

During his term as Governor-General, on 29 May 1970, Queen Elizabeth II appointed him a Knight Grand Cross of the Royal Victorian Order (GCVO), an appointment within her personal gift.

Hasluck received the Commemorative Medal of the 2500th Anniversary of the founding of the Persian Empire on 14 October 1971.

On 24 April 1979, he was made a Knight Companion of the Order of the Garter (KG).

The Federal Division of Hasluck is named jointly after Sir Paul and his wife Dame Alexandra Hasluck.

== Coat of Arms ==
Coat of arms of Sir Paul Hasluck, KG, GCMG, GCVO
Crest In front of a mullet of seven points Or a Xanthorrhea plant in bloom proper. Escutcheon Per pale and per chevron Or and Azure three Catherine wheels within a border counterchanged. Supporters Dexter: a pelican proper; Sinister: a cormorant proper Motto PERFER ET OBDURA Orders Order of the Garter; Order of St Michael and St George; Royal Victorian Order

== Bibliography ==
=== Poetry ===
- Hasluck, Paul (1939). Into the desert. Claremont, W.A.: Freshwater Bay Press.
- Collected Verse, Hawthorn Press, 1969.
- An Open Go, Hawthorn Press, 1971.
- The Poet in Australia, Hawthorn Press, 1975.
- Dark Cottage (poems), Freshwater Bay Press, 1984.

=== Political writing ===
- Black Australians: A Survey of Native Policy in Western Australia, 1829–1897, Melbourne University Press (Melbourne), 1942, 2nd edition, 1970.
- Workshop of Security, F. W. Cheshire, 1948.
- The Government and the People, Australian War Memorial, Volume I: 1939–41, 1951, Volume II: 1942–45, 1970.
- Native Welfare in Australia, P. Brokensha, 1953.
- A Time for Building: Australian Administration in Papua-New Guinea, 1951–1963, Melbourne University Press, 1976.
- The Office of Governor-General, (PDF) Melbourne University Press, 1979.
- Sir Robert Menzies, Melbourne University Press, 1980.
- Diplomatic Witness: Australian Foreign Affairs, Melbourne University Press, 1980.
- Shades of Darkness: Aboriginal Affairs, 1925–1965, Melbourne University Press, 1988.
- The Chance of Politics, edited by Nicholas Hasluck, Text Pub. (Melbourne), 1997

=== Biographical ===
- Mucking About: An Autobiography, Melbourne University Press, 1977, published with a new foreword, University of Western Australia (Nedlands, Australia), 1994.
- Light That Time Has Made, National Library of Australia (Canberra), 1995.

=== Critical studies and reviews ===
- Ryan, Peter (December 1995). "The clear voice of hope". Books. Quadrant. 39 (12): 77. Review of Light that time has made.
- Peter Ryan, "Paul Hasluck", in Brief Lives, Duffy & Snellgrove, Sydney, 2004, pp. 91–104.

Diplomatic posts
Preceded by Norman Makin as Head of Delegation	Permanent Representative of Australia to the United Nations; 1946–1947	Succeeded by John Hood
Parliament of Australia
New division	Member for Curtin; 1949–1969	Succeeded by Victor Garland
Political offices
Preceded by Richard Casey	Minister for Territories; 1951–1963	Succeeded by Charles Barnes
Preceded by Athol Townley	Minister for Defence; 1963–1964	Succeeded by Shane Paltridge
Preceded by Garfield Barwick	Foreign Minister; 1964–1969	Succeeded by Gordon Freeth
Government offices
Preceded by Lord Casey	Governor-General of Australia; 1969–1974	Succeeded by Sir John Kerr
