= George Steward =

Australian senior public servant and military officer

Lieutenant Colonel Sir George Steward KBE, CMG
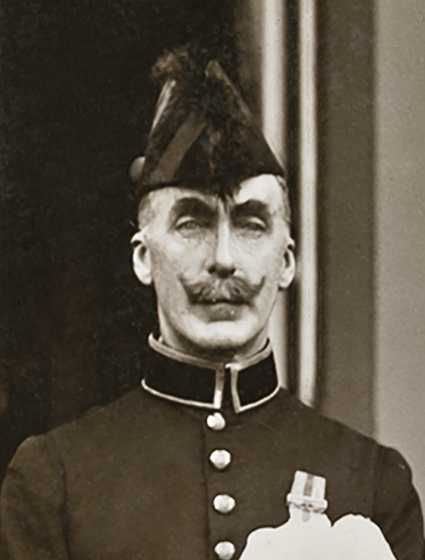
- George Steward circa 1914

7th Chief Commissioner of Victoria Police
- In office 1 March 1919 – 11 May 1920
- Preceded by: Alfred Sainsbury
- Succeeded by: Sir John Gellibrand

1st Official Secretary to the Governor-General of Australia
- In office 27 March 1903 – 28 February 1919
- Monarchs: Edward VII; George V
- Governors-General: Lord Tennyson; Lord Northcote; Lord Dudley; Lord Denman; Sir Ronald Munro Ferguson
- Preceded by: Post created
- Succeeded by: John Starling

Personal details
- Born: 18 March 1865 Spitalfields, London, England
- Died: 11 May 1920 (aged 55) Melbourne, Victoria, Australia

Military service
- Allegiance: Australia
- Branch/service: Tasmanian Auxiliary Forces; Citizen Military Forces
- Years of service: 1898–1919
- Rank: Lieutenant Colonel
- Commands: 50th Infantry (St Kilda) Regiment

Lieutenant Colonel Sir George Charles Thomas Steward, KBE, CMG (18 March 1865 – 11 May 1920) was a senior Australian public servant and officer in the Australian Army. He held several notable positions during his career, including Official Secretary to five Governors-General, being the first to hold that title, and Chief Commissioner of the Victoria Police from 1919 until his death in 1920. During his time as Official Secretary, Steward founded the Australian branch of the Imperial Counter Espionage Bureau, later known as the Special Intelligence Bureau (SIB). This was Australia's first secret intelligence service.

== Career ==
Steward was a member of the civil service of the colony of Tasmania, in which he advanced rapidly. He was an officer in the Tasmanian Auxiliary Forces, and later the Australian Citizen Military Forces. He raised the first Mounted Infantry Corps of Tasmania.

At Federation in 1901, there was a push from the newly formed states to have representatives from their former colonial civil services to take senior positions in the new Commonwealth Public Service. Steward was originally expected to become the Secretary of the Department of External Affairs. However, Sir Edmund Barton, Prime Minister and holding the portfolio of Minister for External Affairs, decided instead to appoint Atlee Hunt as the senior official in the Department. Steward instead served as Chief Clerk.

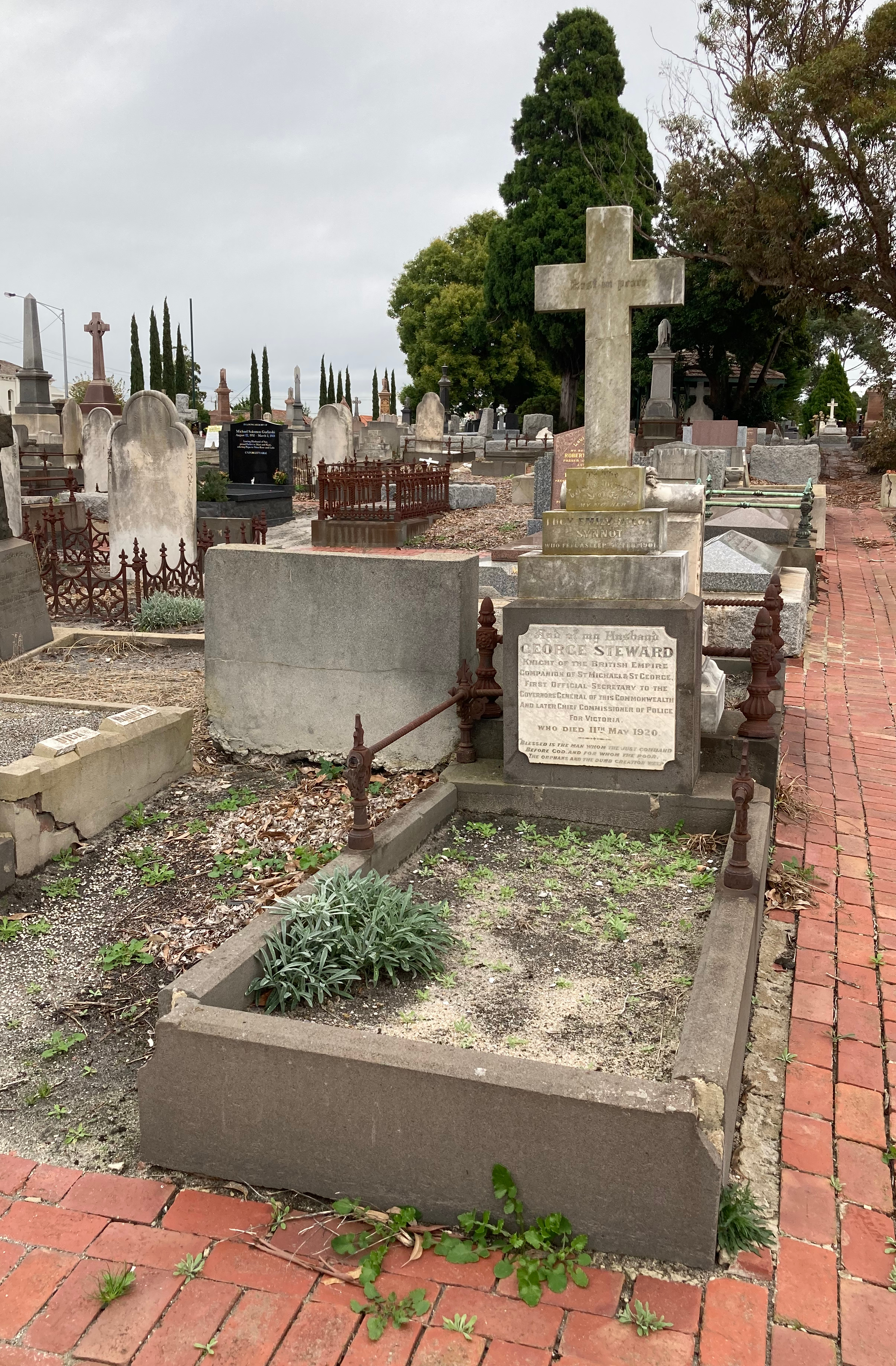
Steward's grave at St Kilda Cemetery

In December 1902, Steward was appointed as the Official Secretary to the Governor General, Lord Tennyson. He was the first person to serve in this position which he held for seventeen years, under five Governors General. When war broke out in 1914, Steward's civilian employment took precedence, and he was not released for military service despite his military experience. In 1916, as part of his role in the Governor General's office, Steward founded the Australian branch of the Imperial Counter Espionage Bureau, later known as the Special Intelligence Bureau (SIB). This was Australia's first secret intelligence service.

Steward was appointed as Chief Commissioner of the Victoria Police in 1919, which attracted some controversy because he was not a police officer himself. He served as Chief Commissioner until his death on 11 May 1920, after suffering a heart attack while driving. He is buried in the St Kilda Cemetery.

== Honours and awards ==
Steward was appointed a Companion of the Order of St Michael and St George in 1909, and a Knight Commander of the Order of the British Empire in 1918.

== Family ==
Steward was twice married. His first wife was Edith Jermyn (b. 1868) daughter of a fishmonger, whom he married in Stepney in December 1885. They had two sons Reginald George Steward (1886–1945) and Herbert Charles "Bertram" Steward (1888–1955). Edith and the children accompanied Steward to Tasmania in 1892 but left him and returned to London in about 1894. Steward later (1906) divorced Edith on grounds of adultery. In February 1908 he married Anna Lucas Synnott of Geelong, Victoria. They had no children. She survived him and later remarried, dying in 1936.
