= Royal Australian Naval Bridging Train =

The Royal Australian Naval Bridging Train
- Badge of the Royal Australian Navy Bridging Train
- Active: 24 February 1915 – May 1917
- Country: Australia
- Branch: (Australia) Royal Australian Navy
- Type: Bridging Train
- Role: Logistical Support; Combat Engineers; Harbourmasters
- Size: 9 Officers, 348 Other Ranks on embarkation at Melbourne (June 1915)
- Part of: Royal Australian Naval Brigade; Attached to British Army IX Corps
- Engagements: First World War: Gallipoli Campaign; Landing at Suvla Bay; Sinai and Palestine Campaign; Battle of Magdhaba

Commanders
- Notable commanders: Leighton Bracegirdle

The Royal Australian Naval Bridging Train was a unique unit of the Royal Australian Navy. It was active only during the First World War, where it served in the Gallipoli and the Sinai and Palestine Campaigns. The Train was formed in February 1915 and stood down in May 1917. Throughout its existence, it was composed of Royal Australian Naval Reservists under the command of Lieutenant Commander Leighton Bracegirdle. Normally under the command of the British IX Corps, the Train also supported the I ANZAC Corps and Imperial Camel Corps in the defence of the Suez Canal.

They were the only Australian naval unit serving in a European theatre of war. They were therefore bent on proving, both to the Royal Navy and to the British Army, that they could overcome any difficulties.

— Lt Commander Bracegirdle, Officer Commanding, RAN Bridging Train

The Train was Australia's most decorated naval unit of the First World War, with more than 20 decorations awarded to its sailors.

== Formation and recruitment ==
By 1915, with the prompt seizure of Germany's Pacific possessions, it was becoming apparent that there would be very little for the Royal Australian Naval Brigade to do beyond securing Australia's ports. It was also becoming obvious that trench warfare was going to be the main feature of the Western Front, and that engineering units were in strong demand. Reports reached Australia that even a Naval contingent would be acceptable, as the 63rd (Royal Naval) Division, consisting of Royal Marines and Naval Reservists, was preparing to join the Western Front.

The Naval Board was quick to move on these reports, making this recommendation to the Minister for Defence:

The Naval Board, having consulted the Chief of the General Staff as to most suitable method by which services of RANR officers and men can be made use of in the present war, propose that an offer be made to the Home Government to supply two Bridging Trains, completed to war establishment, the same to be manned by naval ratings drawn mainly from ranks of RANR It is proposed that, while retaining naval ranks and ratings in all other respects, the men comprising these trains should be paid, organised, equipped, and trained under military supervision.

— Navy Board recommendation, Australia in the War of 1914–1918, Volume IX

On 12 February, the Government made the offer to the Imperial Government to provide one Bridging Train, in accordance with "Imperial War Establishments." Within a week, the offer was accepted.

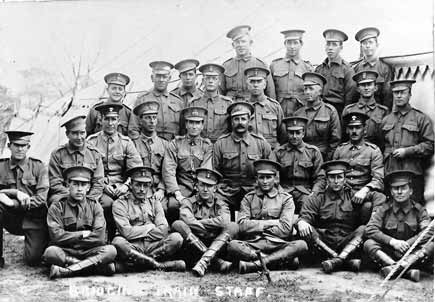
The RANBT Staff circa 1915.

Command of the Train was given to Lieutenant Commander Bracegirdle, with Lieutenant (later, Commander) Thomas Bond DSO VD RANR as his First Lieutenant. Both officers had been involved in the surrender of German New Guinea, Bond had led the attack on the wireless station, and Bracegirdle had been left in command of the garrison when Commander Beresford was evacuated for medical treatment. The two officers were appointed on 24 February 1915.

The Train grew to 115 men by 12 March and was encamped on Kings Domain, Melbourne. Bracegirdle and Bond had also discovered that no one left in Australian in either the Army or the Navy had any useful knowledge on the subject of bridging trains, they would have to wait for their pontoons and vehicles to be built – meaning a wait of at least six weeks before they would be able to begin training, and that almost all of their unit would need to be taught to ride, on very few horses.

The Train embarked upon HMAT A39 Port MacQuarie on 3 June with, according to the Train's Medical Officer, Dr E.W. Morris, 5 officers, 3 warrant officers, 267 Petty Officers and other ranks, 26 reinforcements, 412 horses, 5 6-horse pontoons and tressle waggons, and 8 other vehicles. They were headed to Chatham, England to be trained in the construction of pontoons. Of course, this was the First World War. The Train reached Port Said, Egypt on 17 July 1915, and was issued orders to continue on to England. The next day, the 18th, they received orders to the Dardanelles. Arriving at the Greek isle of Imbros, yet more new orders were received, transferring control of the Train from the British Admiralty, which had been given operational control of the Royal Australian Navy by the Federal Government on 10 August 1914, to the British Army and attaching it to IX Army Corps under Lt. General Stopford which was to land at Suvla Bay on 7 August.

While at Imbros, the Train received a grand total of five days of instruction on the use of their pontoons, a task which needed six days worth of unloading and reloading the equipment. After this minimal training, they were considered ready to land under enemy fire.

== Suvla Bay ==
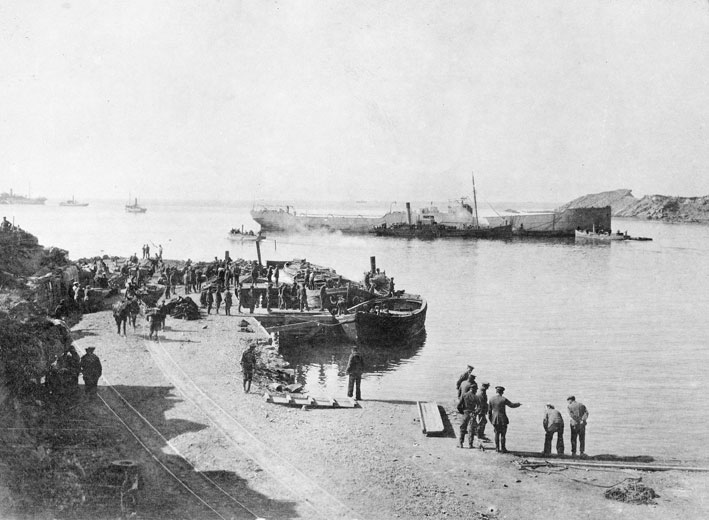
The RAN Bridging Train towing into place a hulk to form a breakwater for the boat dock at West Beach, Suvla Bay, Gallipoli, September 1915.

At 5am on 6 August 1915, the Train, embarked upon HMAT A53 Itria, reached its designated anchorage, and the landing was well underway. A party was sent ashore to find the best place to continue the landing, and where to later build the infrastructure to reinforce the Corps. Mid-morning, when Bracegirdle attempted to confer with the IX Corps Chief Engineer, Brigadier-General E.H. Bland CB CMG RE, as ordered, but was unable to be found. This forced the Train to sit idle until late afternoon when they were tasked with putting together a temporary pier at A Landing, which had been left without a party to construct it. It was the second day at Suvla when the Train began to come into its own, constructing two piers and rowing the second into place at A Beach, a trip of approximately 2 miles (3.2 km), for use by the lifeboats evacuating injured soldiers. The Train assembled the 110-metre-long structure in 20 minutes. The next few days were occupied with constructing further piers as well as landing troops and supplies to assist the landing and shifting their base from their landing point to Kangaroo Beach.

Soon, the Train was put in charge of the landing's water supply, something that had been neglected during the early stage of the campaign. As there was no supply available, water had to be brought by sea, often in petrol tins. This responsibility was given to the Train on 12 August, they were able to source three fire engines and some hoses, which, with the Train's pontoons were used to pump supplies brought from transport ships to tanks on the beach. The fire hoses were kept under guard, and eventually replaced with metal pipe as soldiers would constantly make holes in it to get at the water inside. This was just some of the work that saw the Train removed from the 11th Division and directly attached to the IX Corps Engineers, becoming responsible for all work afloat or on the beach up to the high-water mark that the Navy might require.

The principal duties allotted to the unit by the Royal Navy were as follows: Water supply, care of landing-piers, discharging of stores from store-ships and transports, lighterage of same to the shore, salving of lighters and steamboats wrecked during gales, assisting in salving of T.B.D. Louis, disembarking of troops with their baggage on all beaches, and of munitions and stores. ...
The duties allotted to the unit by the GOC the IX Army Corps were briefly as follows : Control and issue of all engineer and trench stores and materials, care and issue of trench bombs and demolition stores (for some weeks after landing, and until proper ordnance dumps were established), erection of high-explosive magazines, dug-outs, cookhouses, and galleys, assembly of hospital huttings, construction of iron frames for front-line wire entanglements; and the manning and control of the steam-tug Daphne.

— Lt Commander Bracegirdle, Officer Commanding, RAN Bridging Train

Other jobs that fell to the Train were to act as wireless operators and draughtsmen for the Army Corps and Lt Commander Bracegirdle was the "Beachmaster" of Kangaroo Beach.

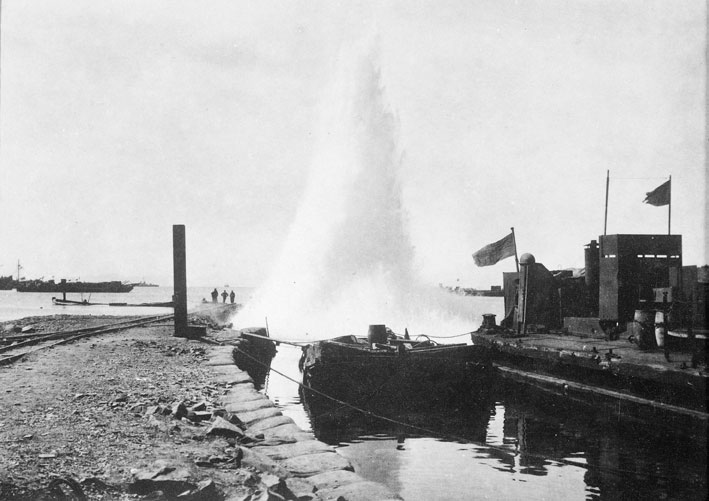
A heavy Turkish shell lands beside a pier constructed by the RAN Bridging Train, Suvla Bay, Gallipoli, October 1915.

According to the Train's log, 30 September was a special day. It was the second day in a row that the base had not been shelled by Turkish artillery. Of course, they would make up for the oversight on 1 October, but for the sailors it was a welcome reprieve. While the Train wasn't itself involved in actual fighting, it was constantly shelled and bombed by Turkish forces. It was a common sight at Suvla to see 40 British soldiers under the direction of a RAN Petty Officer, working to bring supplies ashore during rough weather. The soldiers would openly look forward to returning to their trenches where they at least had the ability to shoot back at anyone who attacked them.

The AIF Official War Correspondent, Charles Bean came to Suvla Bay specifically to report on the Train, where he found that:

There they are to-day, in charge of the landing of a great part of the stores of a British army. They are quite cut off from their own force; they scarcely come into the category of the Australian Force, and scarcely into that of the British; they are scarcely army and scarcely navy. Who it is that looks after their special interests, and which is the authority that has the power of recognising any good work that they have done, I do not know. If you want to see the work, you have only to go to Kangaroo Beach, Suvla Bay, and look about you. They have made a harbour.

— Charles Bean, The Hobart Mercury, 28 December 1915

The supplies landed and distributed by the Train were many and varied. This is a summary of munitions and stores discharged from the storeship Perdsto during the month of September.

Description	Quantity	Description	Quantity
Bombs (various)	372 cases	Corrugated Iron	670 sheets
Grenades (various)	25 cases	Sleepers	160
Gelignite	150 pounds (68 kg)	6" x 6" timber	75 lengths of 16 feet (4.9 m)
Ammonal	500 pounds (230 kg)	12" x 6" timber	50 lengths of 30 feet (9.1 m)
Picks and Helves	2,100	9" x 6" timber	49 lengths of 12 feet (3.7 m)
Shovels	3,050	6" x 4" timber	209 lengths of 16 feet (4.9 m)
Billhooks	160	4" x 4" timber	410 lengths of 12 feet (3.7 m)
Hand Axes	210	3" x 3" timber	625 lengths of 12 feet (3.7 m)
Felling Axes	349	9" x 1.5" timber	89 lengths of 16 feet (4.9 m)
Barbed Wire	320 coils	Nuts & Bolts (various)	6 cases
French Wire	110 coils	Nails (various)	14 cases
Staples for wire	20 boxes	Spikes (various)	2 cases
Spikes for wire	25 boxes	Loophole plates	50 cases

=== Evacuation ===
In November 1915, the British military hero Field Marshal Lord Kitchener toured the Dardanelles as part of his review of the Middle Eastern theatre of operations. After two hours at Anzac Cove, he instructed Lt General Birdwood, the Commander of the Mediterranean Expeditionary Force to begin planning to evacuate the Peninsula. Winter was coming and already too many soldiers were being taken sick and even dying of hypothermia and frostbite, while the Turks had been stubbornly holding their ground. Retreat made sense, aside from just one problem: once the Turks figured out the troops were pulling back, the retreat would very quickly become a bloodbath.

Once the official decision was made by the War Cabinet, preparations were made, carefully disguised to make it seem as though units that could be would be withdrawn to Mudros safely would be, leaving enough troops to defend the ground taken for the winter, while the bulk of the troops would return in spring for a new offensive. Troops and equipment started slipping away from the front and aboard navy vessels from 8 December 1915.

During the time, the Train's log shows work parties completion construction of roads and buildings on the same day as other parties were disassembling other buildings and stocking supplies for transport, with shifts working around the clock. The sick list came down from 70 men before preparations began to a low of 7 on 12 December. The Chief Engineer of IX Corps, General Bland praised the Train for its work in preparing to depart Suvla, saying that

From the time the 1st R.A.N.B.T. joined the IX Corps all ranks have worked hard, cheerfully, and well. They have rendered most valuable services in connection with the construction and maintenance of landing-piers, beach water-supply, and the landing, charge of, and distribution of engineer material at Suvla, and have most willingly given their help in many other directions. Their work has been continuously heavy, and they have done it well.

A fine example of endurance, good organisation, and discipline. Their commanders were indefatigable in anticipating requirements, and assisting whenever and where ever required. I bring them to your notice as two specially valuable and well-commanded units, which can be relied upon to do their best under difficult circumstances.

— Brigadier-General E.H. Bland CB CMG RE, Chief Engineer IX Corps, Official History of Australia in the War of 1914–1918, Volume IX

The Train was the last Australian unit to leave the Gallipoli Peninsula, a party of 50 men under Sub-Lieutenant Charles Hicks was left behind to oversee the evacuation of the British forces. They left at 4.30am, on 28 December – eight days after the evacuation of Anzac Cove. The Train sailed to the Greek isle of Mudros, along with the rest of IX Corps.

== Suez Canal ==
On reaching Mudros, Lt Commander Bracegirdle was hospitalised for Malaria and Jaundice, while command of the Train was returned to the 11th Division from IX Corps. The Train was then temporarily transferred, on 26 December 1915, to the Australian and New Zealand Army Corps. Disciplinary matters, though were handled by Admiral Sir Rosslyn Wemyss, the Royal Navy officer commanding the Port of Moudros. By 5 February 1916, the transfer to I ANZAC Corps was official.

After recuperating at Mudros, the Train set sail under command of Lt. Bond for Lake Timsah on the Suez Canal on 17 January, arriving there on the 21st. Here, at Suez Canal No. 2 Section, the Train was responsible for manning and controlling existing bridges, building new bridges, control of tugboats and lighters and the distribution of stores. On 11 February, the Train split into three sections, with Lt. Bond commanding 57 men at a Serapeum halfway between Lake Tismah and Bitter Lakes, Sub-Lieutenant Charles Hicks with 65 men at the northern approach to Lake Tismah, a place known as Ferry Point. Lt Commander Bracegirdle had joined up with the Train again on 30 January, and was in command at the main camp on Lake Tismah.

Duties at the main camp were light, mainly consisting of experimenting with new iron pontoons, and assisting at the Ismaïlia Canal Works. The two detachments on the other hand were used to operate the small vessels crossing the Canal at all hours of the day and night, and also forming and breaking the pontoon bridges several times each day.

Come March, the Train was in high demand. Admiral Wemyss, now in command of East Indies & Egyptian Squadron, who wanted to use the Train to operate river transports and work as gun crews supporting the Mesopotamian campaign. General Sir Julian Byng, who had taken command of IX Corps at Suvla Bay when the elderly General Frederick Stopford was relieved for incompetence, wanted to bring the Train south to No. 4 Section, Suez Canal, which included all of the Canal south of Small Bitter Lake. Also in March, Lieutenant Bond was transferred to the Naval Intelligence detachment in Alexandria, with Lt Clarence Read taking his place as First Lieutenant.

Byng got his way, and the Train arrived in Suez on 4 May. No.4 Section was the largest of the Canal's divisions, and the Train's responsibilities increased when they arrived. As well as manning bridges and small vessels, building brides, they were now building wharves and piers, controlling tugboats and all military traffic crossing the Canal and constructing pumping machinery IX Corps knew what the Train was capable of and made sure that they got the most out of the Train they could. On the other hand, though, the weather conditions were harsher than they had been up at No. 2 Section, and the Ottoman troops were more active in their attempts at sabotage and air raids were common.

The Train's HQ was set up at Kubri West, with a major detachment at Shallufa, and parties also working at Geneffe, Gurka Post, Baluchi Post, El Shatt, the town of Suez, Port Tewfik and the Canal Quarantine Station, on the Gulf of Suez.

At this time, Allied forces were working to push the Ottoman Troops back from the Canal and deep into the desert. To get their supplies in, it was decided that a railway would be built by the engineers. There was however a slight problem. There was no way to get the locomotives needed onto these rails. The Bridging Train was therefore tasked with building new wharves to unload the locomotives that would be needed for the desert trains, which they did by converting two small vessels into floating pile drivers.

Despite the best efforts of the railway engineers, by the time of the Battle of Magdhaba, the tracks were still 25 miles (40 km) from the town of El Arish, so the Train was called in to manage the landing of supplies on the beach. Unfortunately, the whole bight was mined and the Royal Navy would be unable to sweep it without raising suspicions. The Train's mission was therefore to land on the beach and then construct two piers through the minefield.

Little action was actually seen as the Turks slipped out of El Arish, apparently getting wind of the attack a day before the Train landed. But it was one of the few times that the Train supported other Australian forces in combat, the Imperial Camel Corps and Australian Light Horse under General Sir Harry Chauvel were both involved in the Battle. However, this was the last real action that the Train saw before being disbanded.

== Disbandment ==
By the end of 1916, when Lieutenant Cameron was appointed First Lieutenant, new members who had not served under fire started to complain that they were being used for simple work that could be done by the Egyptian labourers. Word of this eventually reached the Defence Department who soon wrote to the Commonwealth Naval Board, which said that the men of the train "would be unsuitable for use aboard HMA Ships; if no longer required as a Bridging Train, the unit should be disbanded, and its members either sent as reinforcements to the Australian Engineers or Artillery, or brought back to Australia." Next, the Defence Department took the matter to the War Office, where General Archibald Murray, the General Officer Commanding Egypt made his opinion that the Train was engaged in "work of an important military nature".

Lt Commander Bracegirdle was informed at the start of January 1917 that the Train would be relieved of it duties on the Canal and get back into the War, heading deeper into Palestine. The Train then spent January preparing for their new mission, only to be informed that only part of the unit would be required for the duties in Palestine on 8 February 1917. He was also instructed to find out how his men could be redistributed. 76 indicated they would be willing to transfer to the AIF, 43 to the Royal Navy, while the remainder wished to stay with the Train.

After this, on 18 February, the War Office sent the Defence Department another telegram on the matter, which does not reflect the outcome of Bracegirdle's survey at all:

Recommend that personnel of Australian Naval Bridging Train be transferred to Australian army, with exception of 4 officers and 80 other ratings who will be retained in unit reorganised in two sections – one consisting of skilled engineers and kindred trades, and one of expert pier-builders and shore-workers. Personnel transferred to Australian army would be posted to whichever arm they are best suited. Anyone not accepting transfer to be discharged and returned to Australia

— War Office Telegram, Official History of Australia in the War of 1914–1918, Volume IX

Nonetheless, the Australian Government accepted the War Office's recommendation. On the same day, Lt Commander Bracegirdle was relieved of command and appointed Officer Commanding Troops aboard the transport SS Willochra, 5 March 1917.

On 20 March, the Train was informed that they were being disbanded and were asked to make a choice as to their next assignment. The results were very clear, the vast majority of members choosing to remain with the Royal Australian Navy.

Option	Number Choosing
Return to Australia for service with RAN	153
Transfer directly to the Australian Artillery	43
Transfer directly to the Australian Light Horse	4
Transfer directly to a replacement AIF unit that never eventuated	4

Despite the results of this poll, 194 officers and ratings embarked on the troopship HMAT A45 Bulla on 26 May 1917 and arrived at Melbourne on 10 July. They were then returned to their State of origin and discharged by 22 May.

Bean's Official History states that this came about through a series of miscommunications between the War Office, Department of Defence, Commonwealth Naval Board and the Train itself, and that several months later, in July 1917, it was decided to reform the Train, but its members had dispersed too far to be recalled.

During its existence, the Train had made two amphibious landings (Gallipoli and El Arish), and lost 25 sailors killed. Lieutenant Commander Bracegirdle was awarded the Distinguished Service Order and Mentioned in Despatches three times for his command of the Train, while 16 of his men were also Mentioned in Despatches.

== See also ==
- Royal Naval Division
- Naval Brigade
- Australian Imperial Force
- Military history of Australia during World War I
