= Murray Tyrrell =

Australian public servant (1913–1994)

Sir Murray Tyrrell KCVO, CBE
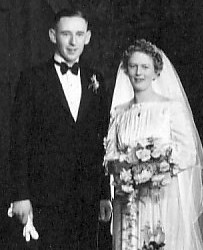
- The Tyrrells on their wedding day, 6 May 1939

4th Official Secretary to the Governor-General of Australia
- In office 25 March 1947 – 30 January 1973
- Monarchs: George VI; Elizabeth II
- Governors-General: Sir William McKell (1947–53); Sir William Slim (1953–60); The Viscount Dunrossil (1960–61); The Viscount De L'Isle (1961–65); The Lord Casey (1965–69); Sir Paul Hasluck (1969–73)
- Preceded by: Sir Leighton Bracegirdle
- Succeeded by: Sir David Smith

Personal details
- Born: Murray Louis Tyrrell; 1 December 1913 Kilmore, Victoria, Australia
- Died: 13 July 1994 (aged 80) Canberra, Australian Capital Territory
- Spouse: Ellen St Clair Greig (m. 1939)
- Children: 3

Sir Murray Louis Tyrrell, KCVO, CBE (1 December 1913 – 13 July 1994) was an Australian public servant who served as the Official Secretary to the Governor-General of Australia for a record 26 years, from 1947 to 1973, in which he served six governors-general.

== Early life ==
Born in Kilmore, Victoria, Tyrrell was the third of five children of Thomas Michael Tyrrell, postmaster, and his wife Florence Evelyn (née Kepert). Tyrrell was educated at Orbost and Mordialloc and Melbourne Boys' High Schools. He married Ellen (Nell) St Clair Greig on 6 May 1939. They had three children.

== Career ==
Tyrrell served for over 45 years in the Australian Public Service. For most of this time he was assistant secretary or personal secretary to a succession of Ministers including the Prime Minister, Ben Chifley.

Tyrrell succeeded Rear Admiral Sir Leighton Bracegirdle as Official Secretary to the Governor-General, William McKell, in March 1947. Tyrrell also served McKell's successors Sir William Slim, Lord Dunrossil, Lord De L'Isle, Lord Casey and Sir Paul Hasluck. The Queen named him a Commander of the Royal Victorian Order for his service rendered during the Royal Visit in 1954. He was also appointed a Commander of the Order of the British Empire in 1959.

Tyrrell had a small but pivotal role to play in the establishment of the Australian Conservation Foundation. The ACF began in the second half of 1964, after a suggestion was made to Tyrrell by The Duke of Edinburgh while visiting Australia in 1963. He voiced an idea that Australia could become involved in conservation by establishing a branch of the World Wildlife Fund. Tyrrell convened a meeting that came to the conclusion that, if a conservation body was to exist, its efforts should be directed at conserving Australia's own heritage. From this the ACF emerged.

Tyrrell was appointed a Knight Commander of the Royal Victorian Order in 1968, during Lord Casey's term. This was awarded for personal service to the Queen, and was not on the recommendation of the Prime Minister. He had been attached to The Royal Household at Buckingham Palace from May to August 1962. After his retirement in 1973, he was succeeded by David Smith. In 1977, he was named the Australian of the Year, jointly with Dame Raigh Roe.

Tyrrell lived at 11 Blundell Street, Queanbeyan, New South Wales, in an old heritage cottage still called "Sir Murray Tyrrell's Cottage". He was an Alderman of the Queanbeyan City Council from 1976 to 1980.

Tyrrell died on 13 July 1994 in Canberra at the age of 80.

== Honours ==
- 1954 – Commander of the Royal Victorian Order (CVO), in connection with the Royal Visit
- 1959 – Commander of the Order of the British Empire (CBE)
- 1968 – Knight Commander of the Royal Victorian Order (KCVO)

Awards
Preceded by Sir Edward Dunlop	Australian of the Year Award; 1977; Served alongside: Raigh Roe	Succeeded by Alan Bond; Galarrwuy Yunupingu
Government offices
Preceded by Sir Leighton Bracegirdle	Official Secretary to the Governor-General of Australia; 1947–1973	Succeeded by Sir David Smith
