= Official Secretary to the Governor-General of Australia =

- Incumbent; Gerard Martin since 1 July 2024
- Office of the Official Secretary to the Governor-General
- Appointer: Governor-General-in-Council
- Term length: at the Governor-General's pleasure
- Inaugural holder: Sir George Steward
- Formation: 1903
- Salary: $374,690

The official secretary to the governor-general of Australia and staff provide support to the governor-general of Australia to enable the governor-general to carry out their constitutional, statutory, ceremonial and public duties. Until 1903, a private secretary provided the support to the governor-general, when the official secretary position was established. The position was abolished in 1928 after the Parliament moved from Melbourne to Canberra, but was recreated in 1931. The position was established by statute in its current form in 1984. Since 1 July 2024, the official secretary has been Gerard Martin.

== Duties ==
The support provided by the Office of the Official Secretary includes the organisation of, and advice relating to, their duties, hospitality for official functions, and administration of the Australian honours and awards system. The official secretary acts as the secretary of the Council for the Order of Australia.

The office also manages and maintains the official properties and associated heritage buildings and grounds, and opens the properties to members of the public for events sponsored by charitable institutions. The official secretary is supported in his or her role by program managers responsible for Executive Support, Household and Property, Organisation Services, and by the Director of the Honours Secretariat.

== History ==
The best known official secretary is Sir David Smith, who served five governors-general between 1973 and 1990. He was official secretary to Sir John Kerr at the time of the 1975 Australian constitutional crisis. Following the dismissal of Prime Minister Gough Whitlam and the swearing-in of the leader of the Opposition, Malcolm Fraser, Smith read out the proclamation of the dissolution of Parliament on the steps of the then Parliament House (now Old Parliament House) in Canberra, with Whitlam and a large crowd attending. The official secretary's proclamation was referred to in Whitlam's famous address to the crowd:

Well may we say "God save the Queen" because nothing will save the Governor-General. The proclamation you have just heard read by the Governor-General's Official Secretary was countersigned "Malcolm Fraser", who will undoubtedly go down in Australian history from Remembrance Day 1975 as Kerr's Cur.

Whitlam chose those words to highlight the fact that his government (since winning the double dissolution election of 1974) had abolished use of the words "God Save The Queen" at the end of all official proclamations. Its reinstatement by Smith was an autocratic act taken entirely on his own part; indeed, the newly minted "caretaker" Fraser government was not empowered to make such changes. At that time, the official secretary was an officer of the department of the Prime Minister and Cabinet, on secondment to Government House. The department held and processed all Government House's personnel and financial records. This lack of formal independence led some to criticise Smith in 1976 for having failed to keep Whitlam and his departmental head informed of Kerr's thinking in the period leading up to Whitlam's dismissal. Smith subsequently resolved to secure more formal independent power for himself, his office and staff. Sir John Kerr, Sir Zelman Cowen and Sir Ninian Stephen all agreed with him but urged a cautious delay. The right time finally arrived in 1984 under the Hawke government.

The 1984 amendment to the Governor-General Act 1974 provided for the establishment of a statutory office of official secretary, to be appointed by the Governor-General-in-Council, to employ the necessary staff, and to hold office at the governor-general's pleasure. All personnel and financial records were transferred to Government House. Since 1985, an annual report of the official secretary is presented to both houses of Parliament.

Some earlier official secretaries played significant political roles in their own right. Lord Hopetoun had brought his own private secretary, Captain Edward Wallington, who handled all his communications with London. The Australians resented an Englishman being in charge of official business. At that time, the payment of the Governor-General's staff and the maintenance of the two official establishments in Sydney and Melbourne was at the Governor-General's personal expense. His successor Lord Tennyson was frugal by nature, and wanted some relief from this financial burden. Prime Minister Alfred Deakin suspected that Tennyson was reporting on him to London and trying to interfere on matters of policy, such as the naval agreement between Britain and Australia. The official secretary would have been involved in these intrigues. He therefore proposed that the governor-general's official secretary be paid for by the Australian government, as long as it was also able to appoint him. The British government objected (privately) because this would mean that the governor-general could not carry out what was seen in London as his broader role in supervising the Australian government. While Tennyson shared this understanding of his role, he nevertheless agreed to Deakin's proposal, and Parliament approved the arrangement in August 1902. However, the relations between the two men, which had been frosty, were not improved by this episode, and Deakin did not encourage Tennyson to seek an extension of his one-year term.

In 1916, Sir George Steward, official secretary to Sir Ronald Munro Ferguson, founded and headed the Counter-Espionage Bureau, Australia's first secret service, whose agents pursued Industrial Workers of the World and Sinn Féin activists. Munro Ferguson was as unenthusiastic about these duties of his official secretary (whom he dubbed 'Pickle the Spy') and the unsavoury characters who consequently lurked about Government House as he was with the secret political work which Steward sometimes performed for Prime Minister Billy Hughes.

The longest serving official secretary was Sir Murray Tyrrell, who served six Governors-General over 26 years from 1947 until 1973.

The current official secretary is Gerard Martin, who took office on 1 July 2024 with Her Excellency the Hon. Sam Mostyn.

== List of official secretaries ==
The following list show the appointed secretaries and acting secretaries in order of appointment. The honours post-nominals shown are those held at the time of appointment.

Portrait	Official Secretary	Post nominals	Period	Governors-general served	Notes
	Major Sir George Steward	KBE, CMG	27 March 1903 – 28 February 1919	Tennyson, Northcote, Dudley, Denman, Munro Ferguson	
	John Starling	CMG, OBE	12 June 1919 – 15 March 1928	Munro Ferguson, Forster, Stonehaven	The position of Official Secretary was abolished in 1928 but Starling continued as Secretary to the Federal Executive Council.
	Rear Admiral Sir Leighton Bracegirdle	KCVO, CMG, DSO, RAN	1931 – March 1947	Isaacs, Gowrie, Gloucester, McKell	
	Sir Murray Tyrrell	KCVO, CBE	25 March 1947 – 30 January 1973	McKell, Slim, Dunrossil, De L'Isle, Casey, Hasluck	
	William Heseltine (acting)	MVO	May – August 1962	De L'Isle	Later served as Private Secretary to the Sovereign being appointed GCB, GCVO, AC, QSO
	Sir David Smith	KCVO, AO	30 January 1973 – 1 September 1990	Hasluck, Kerr, Cowen, Stephen, Hayden	
	Douglas Sturkey	CVO, AM	1 September 1990 – 14 July 1998	Hayden, Deane	
	Martin Bonsey	AO, CVO	15 July 1998 – 9 May 2003	Deane, Hollingworth	
	Malcolm Hazell	CVO, AM	9 May 2003 – 4 September 2008	Hollingworth, Jeffery	Later appointed an Extra Equerry to Queen Elizabeth II and promoted AO.
	Stephen Brady	CVO	5 September 2008 – 26 June 2014	Bryce, Cosgrove	Later served as the Australian Ambassador to France and appointed AO.
	Mark Fraser	LVO, OAM	27 June 2014 – 17 August 2018	Cosgrove	Later promoted CVO and AO.
	Lieutenant Paul Singer	MVO, RANR	18 August 2018 – 1 July 2024	Cosgrove, Hurley	Later promoted CVO.
	Gerard Martin	PSM	1 July 2024 – present	Mostyn	

== See also ==
- Official Secretary to the Governor-General of New Zealand
- Secretary to the Governor General of Canada
