= Australian of the Year =

- Awarded for: Contributing to positive change in Australia
- Date: 26 January
- Country: Australia
- Presented by: National Australia Day Council
- Motto: Reflect. Respect. Celebrate.
- First award: 1960; 66 years ago
- Website: aoty.org.au

Television/radio coverage
- Network: ABC TV

The Australian of the Year is a national award conferred on an Australian citizen by the National Australia Day Council, a not-for-profit Australian Government-owned social enterprise. Similar awards are also conferred at the state and territory level. Katherine Bennell-Pegg is 2026 Australian of the Year.

Since 1960 the award for the Australian of the Year has been bestowed as part of the celebrations surrounding Australia Day, during which time it has grown steadily in significance to become one of the nation's pre-eminent awards. The Australian of the Year announcement has become a notable part of the annual Australia Day celebrations. The official announcement has grown to become a public event, and the Canberra ceremony is televised nationally. The award offers an insight into Australian identity, reflecting the nation's evolving relationship with world, the role of sport in Australian culture, the impact of multiculturalism, and the special status of Indigenous Australians. It has also provoked spirited debate about the fields of endeavour that are most worthy of public recognition.

The award program promotes active citizenship and seeks to elevate certain people as role models. Three companion awards have been introduced, recognising both Young and Senior Australians, and proclaiming the efforts of those who work at a grass roots level through the "Australia's Local Hero" award.

The "Australians of the Year Walk", a walkway in Canberra designed as a public sculpture, was opened on Australia Day 2006.

== History ==
=== 1960s ===
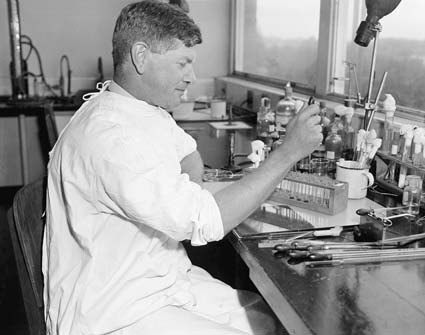
The first Australian of the Year Sir Macfarlane Burnet, Australian of the Year 1960

During the 1960s, a network of state-based organisations worked hard to increase the profile of Australia Day. The most active and best resourced of these was the Victorian Australia Day Council, which had grown out of the Australian Natives' Association. In January 1960 the council's chairman, the unabashed patriot Sir Norman Martin, announced the introduction of a new annual award for the 'Australian of the Year'. He explained that Australia Day was a fitting occasion on which to give proper recognition to a leading citizen, whose contribution to the nation's culture, economy, sciences or arts was particularly outstanding.

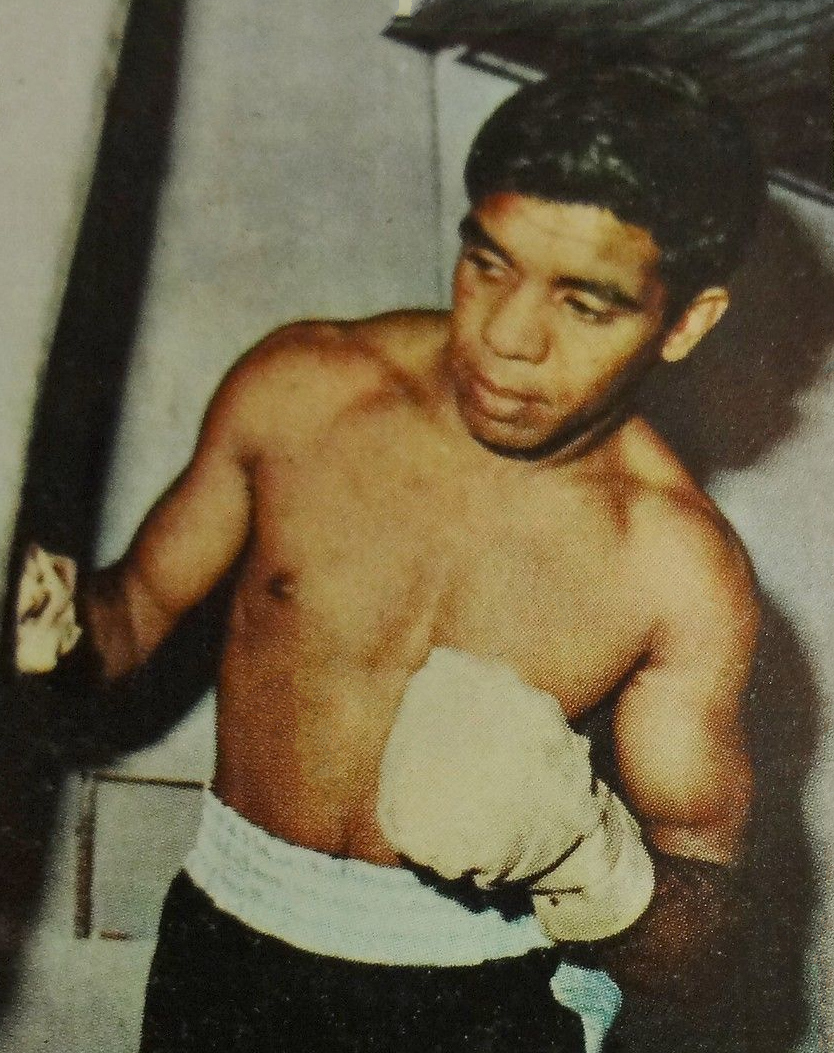
Lionel Rose, 1968 Australian of the Year

For the first two decades the Australian of the Year was chosen by a panel of five, which included the Victorian Premier, the Anglican Archbishop of Melbourne, the vice-chancellor of Melbourne University, the Lord Mayor of Melbourne and the president of the National Council for Women. Although the panel was certainly distinguished, it would in time become too closely associated with Melbourne to be appropriate for a national award. The panel's first choice of Nobel Prize winning immunologist Sir Macfarlane Burnet gained general approval. The editors of The Age proclaimed the new honour was symptomatic of Australia's growing confidence as a nation: 'We are beginning to count for something in the world and we should be intensely proud of this fact.'

International achievement remained a key criterion during the award's first decade. Several sporting heroes were honoured, from America's Cup skipper Jock Sturrock and swimmer Dawn Fraser, to world champion motor racer Sir Jack Brabham and boxer Lionel Rose. The pioneering neurologist Sir John Eccles followed Burnet's example, becoming the second of five Australians to take out the Nobel Prize/Australian of the Year double. Achievers in the artistic realm were also well represented, including opera singer Joan Sutherland, renowned dancer and choreographer Robert Helpmann and the four members of the chart-topping singing group The Seekers – Judith Durham, Athol Guy, Keith Potger and Bruce Woodley. The focus on international achievement reflected the philosophy of the award organisers, who described the Australian of the Year as 'the person who has brought the greatest honour to Australia in the year under review.'

=== 1970s and 1980s ===
During its first two decades, the Australian of the Year award grew steadily in national prominence, but it increasingly suffered from its close association with the Victorian Australia Day Council. A competing Australian of the Year award was established by newspaper The Australian in 1971. In 1975 the newly formed Canberra Australia Day Council also began to name a rival Australian of the Year. The Canberra council was run by a vibrant group of local inhabitants, who pursued a more progressive agenda than their Victorian counterparts. In particular, the Canberra council was sympathetic to the emerging republican movement, while the Victorian council was staunchly committed to constitutional ties with Britain. The Victorian council also battled a common perception that it was an exclusive organisation that represented the Melbourne Establishment. Australia's turbulent political climate nourished this division, and the Australian of the Year award was embroiled in a wider debate about Australian nationalism.

Between 1975 and 1979, the Canberra Australia Day Council named four Australians of the Year. Prime Minister Gough Whitlam lent his support to the Canberra award when he presented the inaugural honour to Major General Alan Stretton, the commander of the emergency response to Cyclone Tracy. The Canberra council also made good use of the federal parliamentary press boxes to promote its award to the national media. The Victorian council was singularly unimpressed that a rival Australia Day organisation had copied its idea – in 1977 it described its own winner, Dame Raigh Roe, as 'the real Australian of the Year'. The impasse was only resolved when the Fraser government created the National Australia Day Council (NADC) in 1979. The Victorian council willingly transferred responsibility for its award to the new national body, while the Canberra council agreed to discontinue its rival program. In 1982, the Victorian council was further sidelined when that state's Australian Labor Party government led by John Cain created a new Victorian Australia Day Committee within the Premier's Department, which joined the NADC's official national network.

The NADC made immediate changes to the selection process, appointing an independent panel of ten leading Australians from diverse fields. Despite this rigorous approach, the panel's first choice of historian Manning Clark did not please conservative politicians, as Clark had been critical of the Fraser government's social policy. If nothing else, the controversy was a clear sign that the award had become a prominent and valued feature of the Australia Day celebrations. In time the selection of the annual winner fell to the board of the NADC itself, whose members are appointed by the Prime Minister of the day. Former NADC chairman Phillip Adams recalls that heated debates were common. Typically the Australian of the Year was chosen at a special two-day board meeting, which Adams likened to the election of a Pope: 'We would go into conclave, there would be lots of hot air, then a puff of smoke.'

The Australian has continued to publish its own annual award, which sometimes coincides with the choice of the National Australia Day Council.

During the 1980s, there was an expectation that corporate sponsorship would replace Government funding and that the NADC would become self-sufficient. The list of former Australians of the Year provides circumstantial evidence of this shift towards a more popular imperative. Economist Sir John Crawford and judge Sir Edward Williams thoroughly deserved their awards, but were perhaps not well placed to promote the importance of Australia Day to mainstream Australia, or to secure corporate sponsorship for the NADC. Subsequent winners included marathon runner Robert de Castella, comedian and actor Paul Hogan, singer John Farnham and cricketer Allan Border, who were far more likely to attract public attention. In 1988, the editor of the Sydney Morning Herald expressed concern at this development: 'One worrying trend with the award is its attachment to ratings. This year's candidates appear to have been people who held high public profiles.' Yet the steadily rising numbers of nominations indicated that the award was capturing the public imagination.

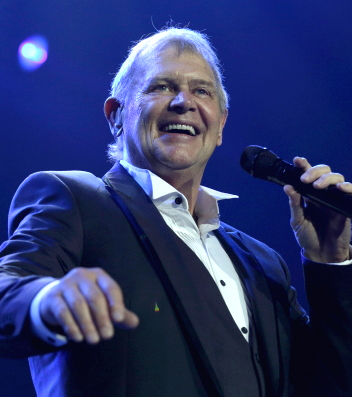
John Farnham was Australian of the Year in 1987

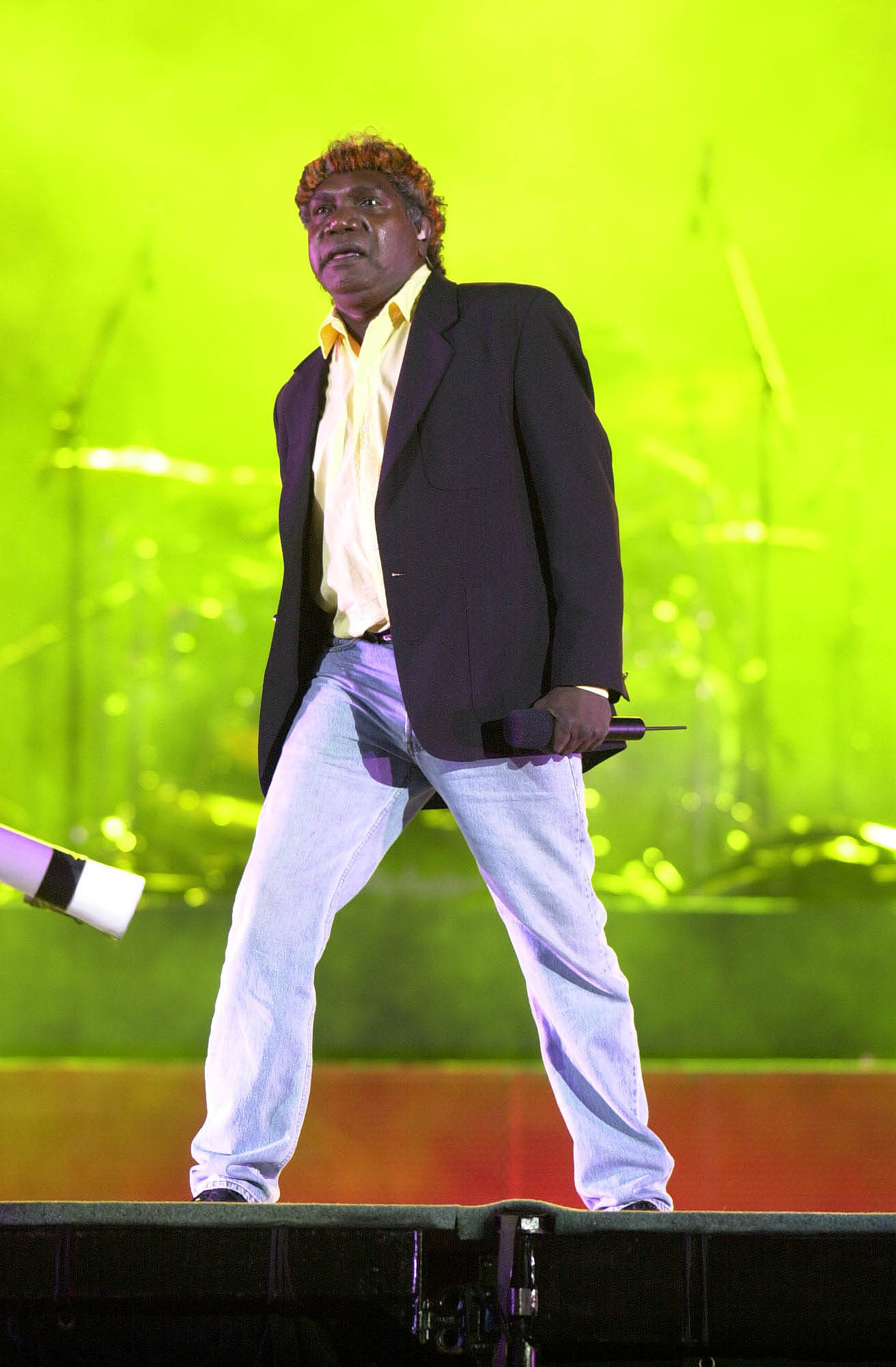
Recognising the role of Aboriginal Australians, Mandawuy Yunupingu, frontman of Yothu Yindi, was Australian of the Year in 1992

=== 1990s ===
During the 1990s, the Australian of the Year award intersected noticeably with the politics of national identity. In its attempt to encourage unified national celebrations, the NADC was a strong promoter of both multiculturalism and reconciliation. The council was also linked to the growing republican movement and the campaign to change the national flag. Australians of the Year in this period included Yothu Yindi lead singer and prominent Aboriginal identity Mandawuy Yunupingu; environmentalist and republican Ian Kiernan; and Chinese-Australian paediatrician John Yu. Yunupingu's award continued a strong tradition of honouring Indigenous Australians. The first Aboriginal winner was boxer Lionel Rose, who quipped: "One hundred and eighty-two years ago one of my mob would have been a dead cert' for this." Since then a further seven Indigenous people have been named Australian of the Year, for achievements in sport, music, politics, law, public service and academia. Many have played a role in Indigenous advocacy and some have raised concerns about the celebration of Australia Day on 26 January, most notably the 1985 recipient Lowitja O'Donoghue.

Prior to 1994 the award was given for the outstanding Australian of the previous year; that is, the 1992 Australian of the Year was announced on Australia Day in 1993. From 1994 onward the award became one for the year ahead, so that the 1994 Australian of the Year was announced on Australia Day in 1994. This resulted in there being no Australian of the Year for 1993.

=== 2000s onwards ===
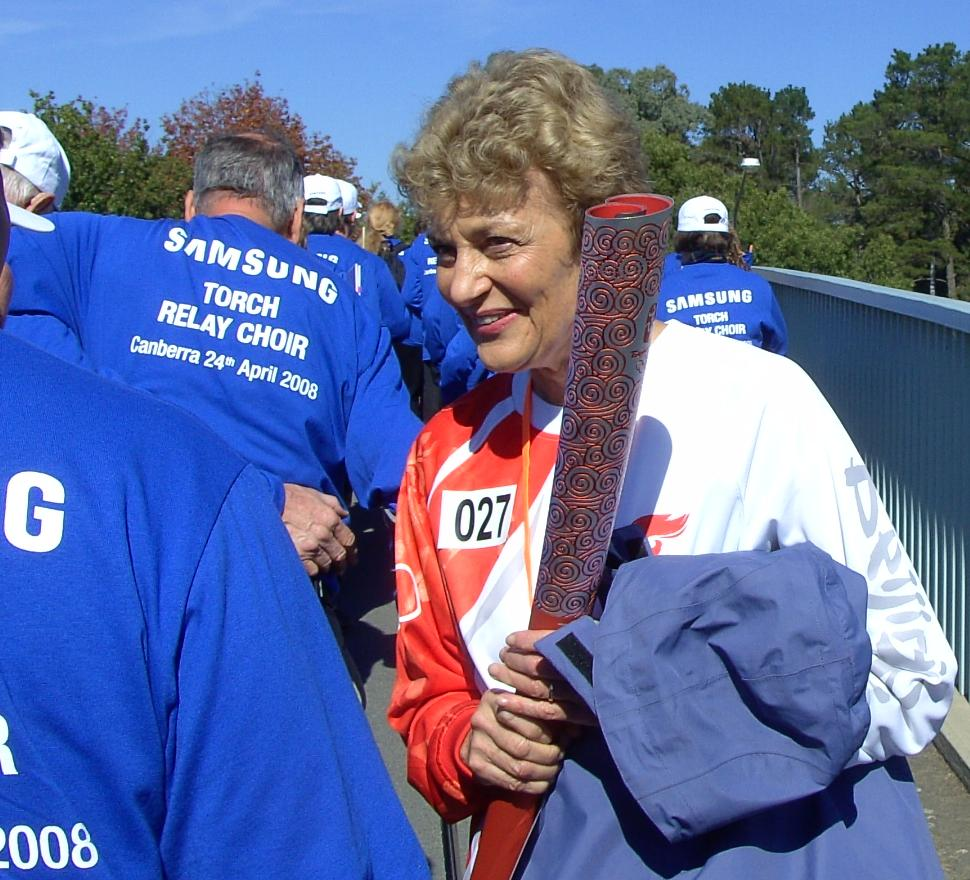
Fiona Stanley, AOTY 2003, with 2000 Summer Olympics torch

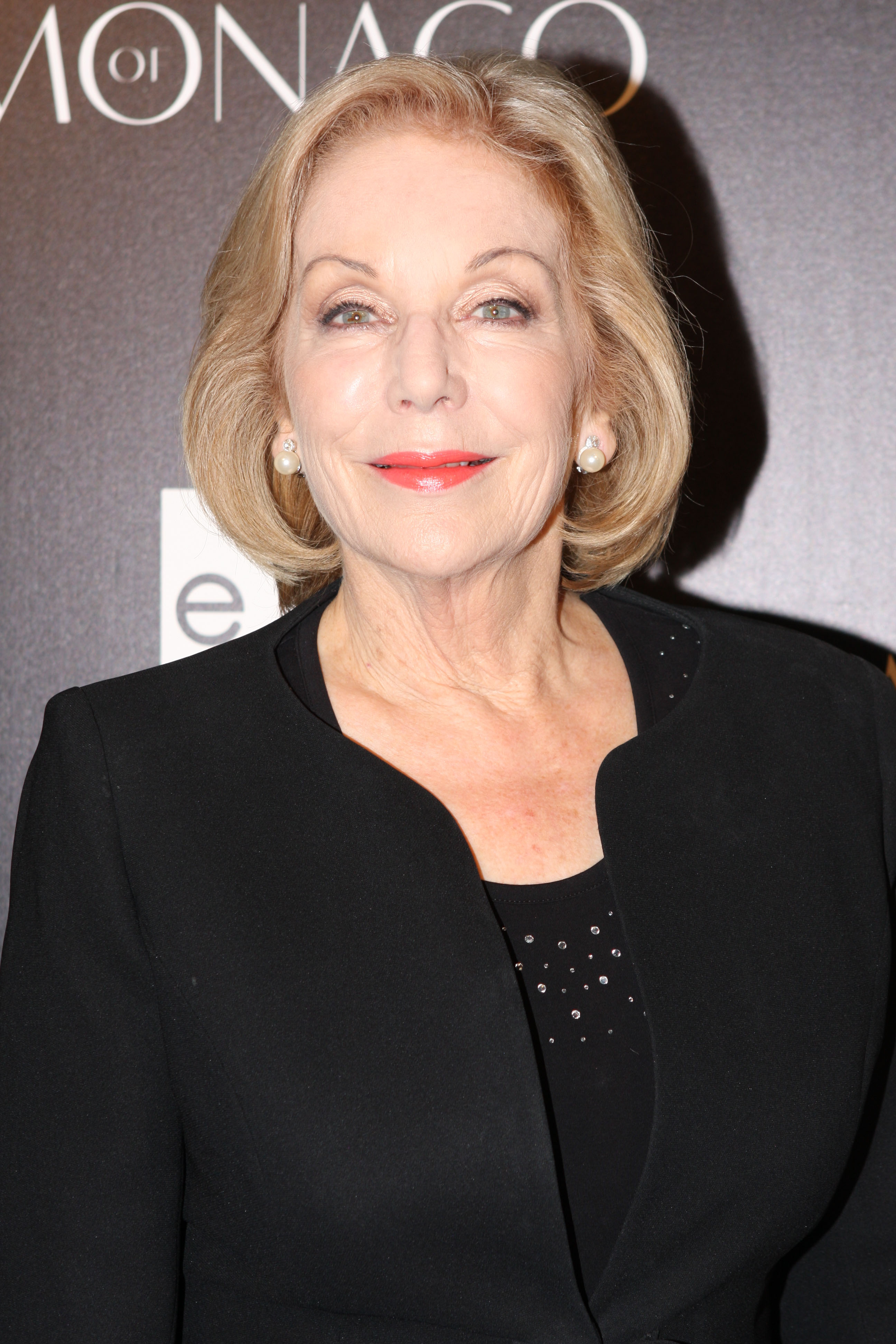
Ita Buttrose, AOTY 2013

Debates about the Australian of the Year award often revolve around the relative balance between sport, science, and the arts. Fourteen winners have excelled in sports as diverse as cricket, swimming, athletics, sailing, tennis, boxing and motor racing. A recurring criticism that sport features too regularly peaked in 2004, when Steve Waugh was the fourth sporting winner in seven years and the third Test Cricket captain to be honoured. Despite the perception of an over-emphasis on sport, the list of past winners reveals a strong endorsement for scientific achievement; as of 2009 thirteen Australian scientists have received the honour, including ten from the medical sciences. A long-term view also reveals that Australia's talented artists have not been neglected; ten winners have excelled in creative pursuits, including six musicians, a dancer, a painter, a comedian and a Nobel Prize-winning novelist.

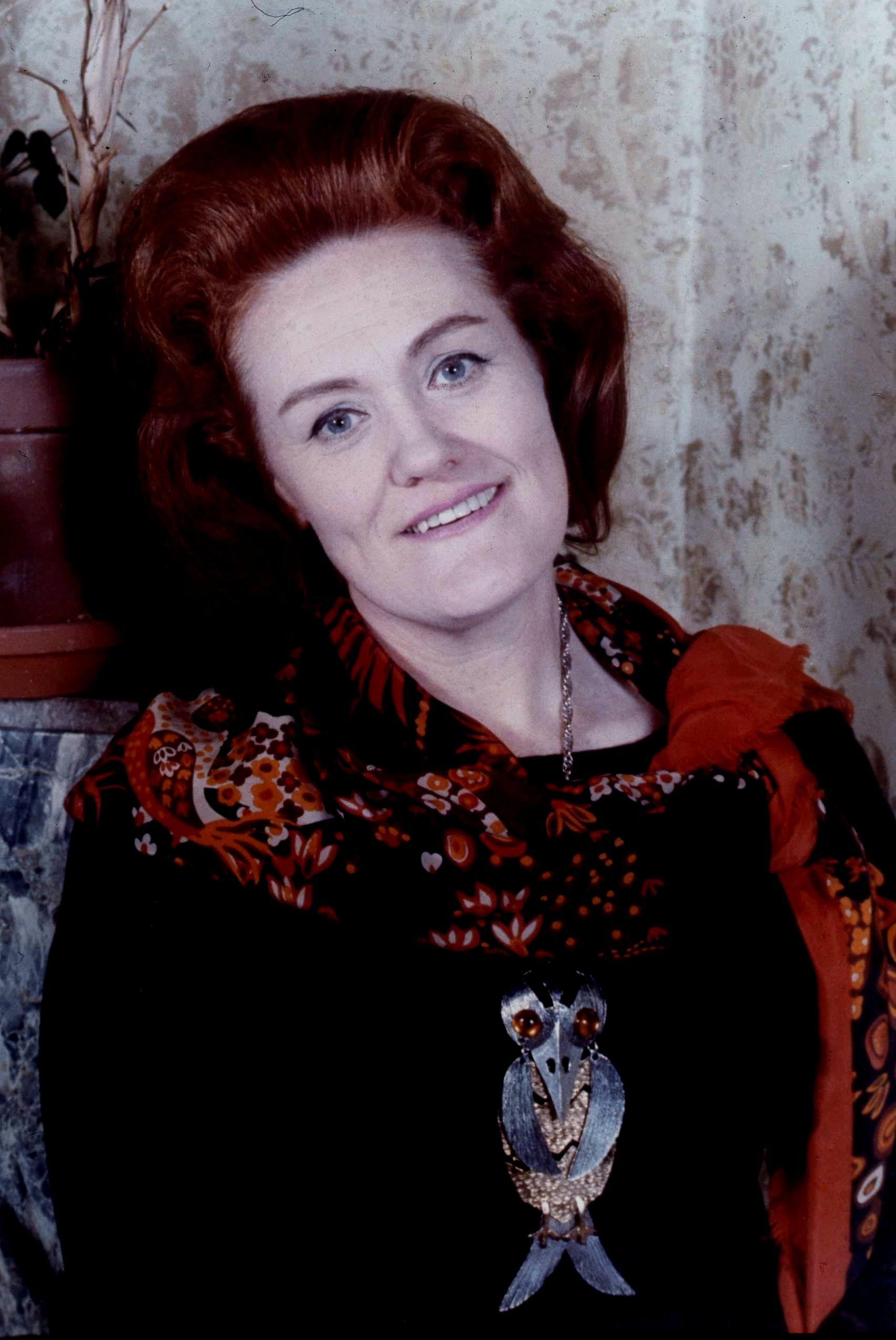
Dame Joan Sutherland, Australian of the Year 1961

Many Australians of the Year do not fit neatly into categories such as sport, science, and the arts. Phillip Adams once described the past winners as "an eclectic collection of people who reflect the diversity of achievement in this country". Australians of the Year have also excelled in public administration, the military, social and community work, business enterprise, academia, religious leadership and philanthropy. There has been relatively little public debate about the gender balance of past winners. In 1961 several news outlets incorrectly referred to Sir Macfarlane Burnet as 'Man of the Year'; the mistake was not allowed to continue, as Joan Sutherland took out the second award, but it is certainly true that women are under-represented. By 2009, 11 winners out of a total of 56 were women.

While the selection of a single Australian of the Year is bound to stimulate debate, the awards program as a whole recognises a much wider range of achievement. In 1979 the NADC named its first "Young Australian of the Year", community service volunteer Julie Sochacki. Twenty years later the veteran country music star Slim Dusty received the inaugural "Senior Australian of the Year" award. In 2003 the NADC introduced an award for "Australia's Local Hero", which honours outstanding contributions to local communities. With four award categories and a system of state and national finals, the NADC now recognises a total of 128 inspiring Australian role models every year.

== Governance and funding ==
The Australian of the Year awards are overseen and chiefly funded by the Australian Government through the National Australia Day Council (NADC), a non-profit social enterprise owned by the Australian Government, accountable to the Department of the Prime Minister and Cabinet. The Australian of the Year award has in the past received substantial sponsorship from private companies. For 38 years until 2019, the Commonwealth Bank was its major sponsor. As of November 2026, most of its partners are government-funded institutions, such as the Office for Youth, National Museum of Australia, and the Australian Broadcasting Corporation. Other partners include ACM Media, ANU, and the MinterEllison law firm.

NADC's mission is to unite all Australians through celebration and reflection. As of 2026 its focus areas are:

- Participation: To unite all Australians through celebration and reflection
- Meaning: To promote the meaning of Australia Day and being Australian
- Recognition: To acknowledge active citizenship and achievement

== Choosing the winners ==
There has also been a significant shift in the criteria for the Australian of the Year award in fifty years. Initially the focus was on awarding the person who had "brought the greatest honour to Australia". This emphasis on international acclaim was gradually relaxed and Australian-based achievement was recognised more often from the 1970s onwards. The official criteria have usually been suitably broad in their scope, so changes in approach are largely attributable to the membership of the NADC board and the political climate of the time. In the mid-1980s there was a notable shift towards high-profile winners, while in the 1990s some of those honoured reflected the prominent political issues of republicanism and reconciliation. Currently, the selection committees refer to three main criteria when considering nominees:

- Demonstrated excellence in their field;
- Significant contribution to the Australian community and nation; and
- An inspirational role model for the Australian community.

The third of these criteria supports the NADC's key goal of encouraging good citizenship. The process of choosing the Australian of the Year has evolved considerably over half a century, including both the make-up of the selection committee and the system of nominations. In the 1960s Sir Norman Martin usually insisted that the decision of the small Victorian selection committee was unanimous. If this is true, then it is in stark contrast to the selection process in the 1990s, when Phillip Adams recalls that heated debates were common. In 1980 the NADC had formed an independent panel to decide the award, but eventually the selection fell to the NADC board itself. Typically the matter was considered at a special two-day board meeting, which Adams likened to the election of a new Pope.

The most significant change in the selection procedure was expansion of the nomination process. In the 1960s and 1970s, the committee usually chose the winner from a relatively small list of nominees; for example, in 1971 Evonne Goolagong edged out only 18 other nominees. At a meeting in 1982, the directors of the NADC and its state-based affiliates identified low nominee numbers as a cause for concern. The problem persisted and board members were regularly encouraged to spread the word and encourage nominations. A public relations report commissioned in 1989 recommended greater community involvement in the nominations process: 'Allow the "ordinary" citizens of Australia a chance to vote for, or in some way have a say in, who should be Australian of the Year.'

The NADC realised that the nominations process is important not only to the integrity of its various awards, but is also a crucial means of engaging with the Australian community. In 2004 NADC Chair Lisa Curry-Kenny proudly reported that nominations had doubled from the previous year: "This is a key indication that increasing numbers of Australians of all walks of life are actively engaging with the awards program". Public interest in the awards serves a much broader purpose, as NADC Chief Executive Warren Pearson explained: "The awards program is not primarily about choosing four national recipients; it is about engaging with Australians about citizenship". The introduction of the Local Hero award in 2003 was directed towards this goal, as were various other changes made in 2004. Most importantly, the NADC introduced a new selection process based around state finals. This approach meant a more prominent role for the state-based Australia Day councils and committees, which oversee the selection of the finalists and host official functions to announce the contenders in November each year.

The NADC board only chooses between the eight state and territory finalists in each category and organises the national announcement in January.

In 2016, opinion pieces in The Daily Telegraph and The Australian criticised the selection process. Following criticism by some conservatives of the selection of 2016 recipient David Morrison, who "outlined a progressive vision for a republican, equal opportunity, multicultural nation", a Sydney Morning Herald editorial opined: "Finding the balance is difficult given the competing visions for the nation. Australia Day... Public confidence in the process of selecting the Australian of the Year is crucial", promising to "look closely at the 2016 process and work to improve public confidence in the awards in time for a better Australia Day in 2017".

== Awards ==
=== Australian of the Year ===
The main award is the Australian of the Year.

=== Young Australian of the Year ===
For the first twenty years of the Australian of the Year Awards there was no specific honour reserved for younger Australia. This period several young sports stars won the main award, including Dawn Fraser, Shane Gould, Lionel Rose and Evonne Goolagong. Gould remains the youngest person to be named Australian of the Year.

Shortly after the formation of the NADC in October 1979, the Northern Territory representative Ella Stack convinced her fellow board members to introduce a new award that focused specifically on the achievements of younger Australians. The inaugural winner, youth unemployment worker Julie Sochacki, was named Young Australian of the Year in January 1980. The NADC coordinated the announcement with the Victorian Australia Day Council, which chose the Australian of the Year for the last time. The following year, the NADC assumed responsibility for both awards.

In 1996, at the invitation of Phillip Adams, chairman of the NADC, the Young Australian of the Year Awards was facilitated and coordinated nationally by Awards Australia under the leadership of Jeffrey J Hopp. Hopp and his team ran the awards nationally, working closely with the Australia Day Councils in every state, and NADC Chairmain Kevin Gosper and Lisa Curry until the awards were handed back to the NADC in 2003.

During that period, the awards recognised, Rebecca Chambers, Nova Peris-Kneebone, Tan Le, Bryan Gaensler, Ian Thorpe, James Fitzpatrick, Scott Hocknull And Lleyton Hewitt.

=== Senior Australian of the Year ===
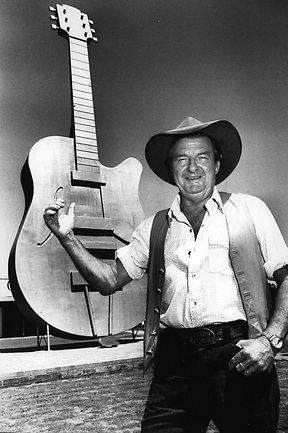
Slim Dusty, Australian Senior of the Year

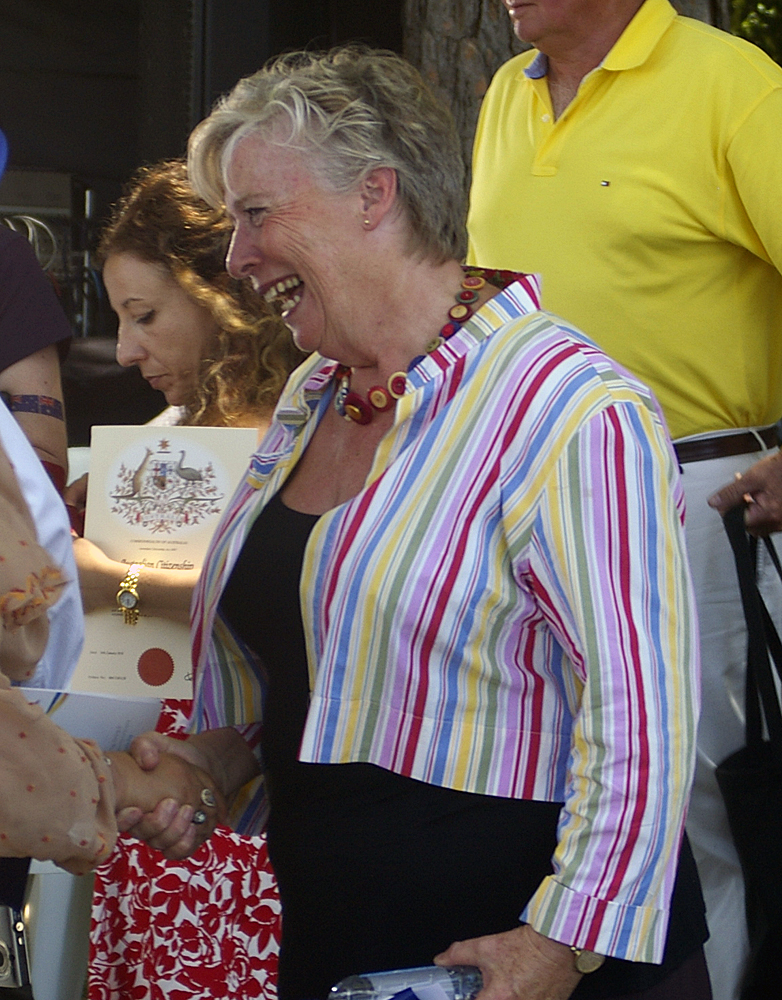
Maggie Beer, Senior Australian of the Year 2010

The Senior Australian of the Year award initially had no connection with the NADC. When the United Nations declared 1999 the 'International Year of Older Persons,' the Minister for Aged Care Bronwyn Bishop approached National Seniors Australia with a plan to increase the prominence of the award. The Department of Health and Ageing took over responsibility for the program and Prime Minister John Howard presented the award to veteran country music star Slim Dusty in October 1999. Bishop arranged for the NADC to administer the program on behalf of the Department of Health and Ageing, but the award continued to be presented in October, with no discernible link to Australia Day. Three years later the NADC streamlined its awards programs. The council was running three separate awards, as even the Young Australian of the Year was announced earlier in January and had a separate nominations process. The Senior Australian of the Year announcement moved from October to January (skipping 2002 altogether) and joined the other two awards. By integrating the various programs, the NADC increased the prominence of the companion awards by announcing them at the same function as the Australian of the Year. Since then, many remarkable Senior Australians have been honoured on a national stage on Australia Day Eve.

=== Australia's Local Hero ===
In 2003, the NADC addressed calls to recognise ordinary, lesser-known people who work for the benefit of their fellow citizens, by introducing a fourth award category known as the "Local Hero Award". The new award was part of a shift in thinking at the NADC towards the key goal of promoting good citizenship.

=== State and territory awards ===
==== South Australia ====
The Australia Day Council of South Australia hosts two additional awards for women, known as the Inspiring Women's Awards, awarded as part of the Australia Day awards and honours. A single award was established in 2011 as the Women Hold Up Half the Sky Award (named after a famous 1978 artwork by Ann Newmarch), before being renamed in 2019 to commemorate the 125th anniversary of women's suffrage in South Australia, with an extra category being added. As of 2026, the awards, which are jointly coordinated by the Australia Day Council of SA and the federal Office for Women (SA), are:

- Inspiring SA Women's Award
- Emerging Leader's Award

Past recipients of the Women Hold Up Half the Sky Award and Inspiring SA Women's Awards include:

- 2012: Katrine Hildyard, who later became Minister for Women
- 2013: Lucy Evans, from Terowie, for her work in Aboriginal health
- 2016: Tara Fatehi, a Kurdish activist living in Adelaide
- 2024: Sophie Thomson, gardening expert, for her role on ABC TV's Gardening Australia; recognised for aiding communities affected by natural disasters as well as community education
- 2025: April Lawrie, a leader in Aboriginal health, justice, education, and child protection

== Statistical profiles ==
=== Award by category ===
	1960–69	1970–79	1980–89	1990–99	2000–09	2010–19	2020–29	Total
Science (non-medical)	1	2	0	0	2	1	0	6
Arts	3	2	2	1	1	1	0	10
Medical science	1	0	0	3	3	2	1	10
Indigenous affairs	0	2	1	1	1	0	0	5
Religion	0	1	0	1	0	0	0	2
Community Service	0	1	0	1	0	4	2	8
Politics/Public office	1	1	1	0	0	0	0	3
Sport	4	2	3	2	2	1	1	15
Non-science academic	0	0	2	0	0	0	0	2
Military service	0	2	0	0	1	0	0	3
Business	0	1	1	0	0	2	0	4

=== Award by gender ===
	1960–69	1970–79	1980–89	1990–99	2000–09	2010–19	2020–29	Total
Female	2	3	2	1	2	3	2	15
Male	7	11	8	8	8	8	2	51

== Announcements ==
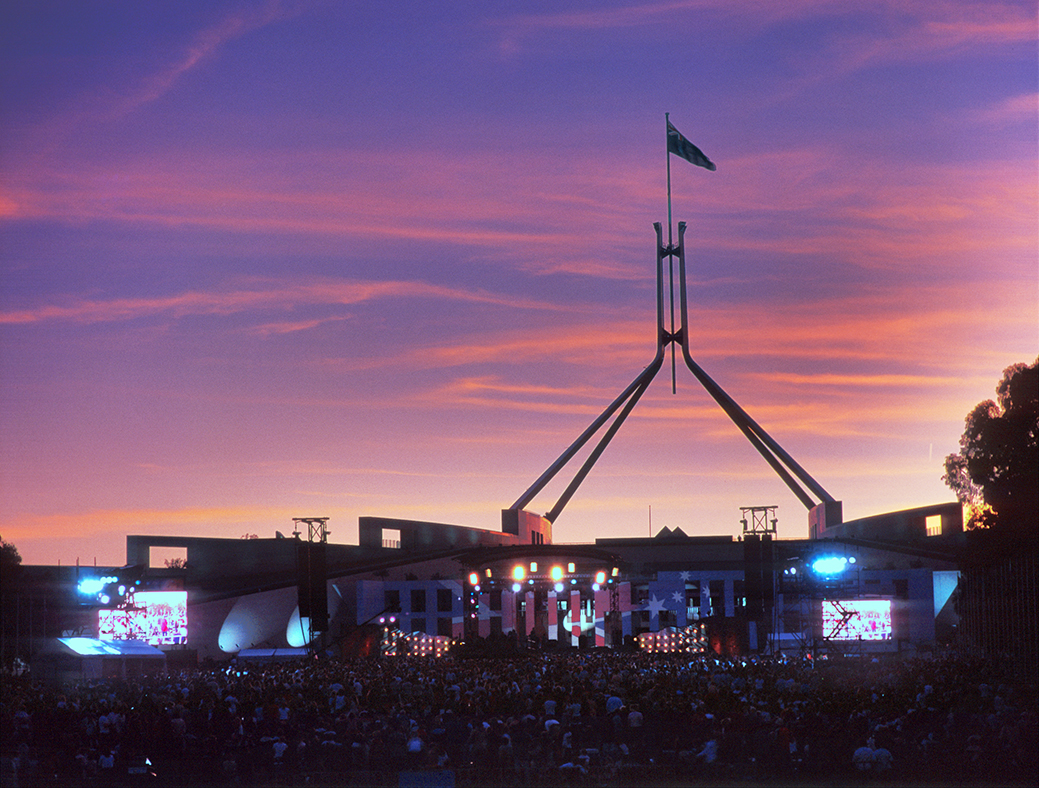
Awards Announcement, Australia Day Eve 25 January 2005

During the 1960s and 1970s, the Australian of the Year award was presented at Melbourne's Australia Day Luncheon, which was held in either the Town Hall or the Royale Ballroom. The winner was usually announced about two weeks earlier at a function that provided an opportunity to promote the upcoming Australia Day celebrations. This event was a public relations exercise that attempted to capture the imagination of the media and the nation, but in 1966 a journalist from The Age did not follow the script, preferring to poke fun at the stage-managed event:

The patriotic tension in the boardroom on the 8th floor of the Australian Natives' Association building in Elizabeth Street yesterday morning was being stretched to breaking point. From four corners of the room hung Australian flags. At the Head of the long boardroom table sat Sir Norman Martin, chairman of the Australia Day Council. ...

There had been intense speculation earlier as to what the "special uniformed messenger" would be wearing when he arrived bearing a sealed envelope containing the Australian of the Year decision. ... He was made to walk from the lift door to Sir Norman twice to satisfy other television cameramen, until, rather thankfully, he at last handed the envelope over.

It was somehow an anticlimax when Sir Norman demanded: "Do you bear a message from the Premier?"

"Yes" said the messenger meekly, and as Sir Norman announced the winner to be Robert Helpmann, a shower of prepared press releases announcing the same thing landed gently on the table in front of the waiting pressmen.

— The 1966 announcement of the Australian of the Year, as reported in The Age.

Since the 1960s, the annual announcement has become progressively more sophisticated. After the NADC took over in 1980 it usually presented the award at an Australia Day concert, which moved around the nation and was often televised. In the 1990s an Australia Day breakfast at Admiralty House in Sydney was the usual venue for the announcement, but more recently the concert has been revived and is held in the national capital.

A highly memorable Australian of the Year function occurred in 1994, when the guest of honour was Charles, Prince of Wales. The Australian of the Year, environmentalist Ian Kiernan, sat on the stage after receiving his award, when a gunshot was heard and an assailant rushed toward Prince Charles. Kiernan jumped to his feet and wrestled the intruder to the ground with the assistance of New South Wales Premier John Fahey. Kiernan later recalled: 'the Premier and I lay on the stage, panting as the adrenaline began to flow, and wondering what to do next.' As it turned out, the man was armed only with a toy cap pistol, but the incident was a serious security breach and somewhat upstaged Kiernan's award.

Since 2004 the award presentation has been held on Australia Day Eve in Canberra. The 32 finalists enjoy an eventful day including morning tea with the Prime Minister at The Lodge, and lunch with the Governor General at Yarralumla. The winners are announced on a specially erected stage in front of Parliament House, witnessed by a crowd of thousands and a national television audience. Specially produced video packages describe the winners in each of the four categories. The scale of the event displays a marked contrast to Sir Norman Martin's modest press conferences of the 1960s.

== Medallions and trophies ==
The various medallions and trophies that have been presented to the Australians of the Year over fifty years are, in themselves, an interesting insight into changing understandings of what it means to be Australian. Reflecting his lofty ambitions for the new award, Sir Norman Martin announced a 'worldwide competition' to design the inaugural trophy in 1960. Sir Norman hoped to attract entries from the world's finest artists, but the eventual winner was Victor Greenhalgh, the head of the Arts School at the Royal Melbourne Institute of Technology. Greenhalgh designed a bronze medallion, which reflected the prevailing mood as to the importance of Australia Day: its most prominent feature was a likeness of Governor Arthur Phillip, who was described on the medal as 'The Outstanding Australian [of] 1788.' In 1961. The Age reported that Sir Macfarlane Burnet was anxious when a photographer asked him to display the medallion at the awards ceremony: 'The nervous scientist, whose hand with a pipette would be as steady as a rock, fumbled the medal and dropped it under the table.'

Greenhalgh's bronze medallion was presented to winners of the Victorian-based Australian of the Year award for two decades. When the NADC assumed responsibility in 1980, it apparently overlooked the issue of a trophy, so Manning Clark received a framed certificate. For the 1986 award to Dick Smith, the NADC commissioned artist Michael Tracey to produce a more appropriate trophy, which the council described in its journal Australia Day Update: 'The trophy, symbolising achievement, incorporates a figure holding the Australian flag. The figure is made from steel and the lettering is in pewter.' In the bicentenary year Tracey was asked to cast his trophy in bronze instead of steel.

In the early 1990s the NADC commissioned glass sculptor Warren Langley to create a new trophy based on the updated Australia Day logo. NADC chairman Phillip Adams had been criticised for removing the Australian flag from the logo and replacing it with a hand reaching for a star. After Adams resigned his position in 1996, the NADC asked Langley to produce an alternative trophy, which featured a map of Australia.

Melbourne-based artist Kristin McFarlane designed the current Australian of the Year trophy in 2004. Like Langley, McFarlane works with glass, but she is also trained as a graphic designer; she combines both text and images and sets them in kilned glass to produce striking works of art. The task of designing a new trophy prompted McFarlane to think more deeply about national identity than she had before: 'It made me look at Australian identity and think about what was an Australian? Who is the archetypal Australian?' She quickly realised that an image of one person, or even a group of people, would not work, and that her images needed to be generic. She decided to use a map of Australia: 'It is one of the oldest continents in the world and it is a very recognisable form for anyone who lives here.' McFarlane also chose to use the text of the Australian national anthem "Advance Australia Fair", but gave particularly prominence to the lesser-known second verse.

== Australians of the Year Walk ==
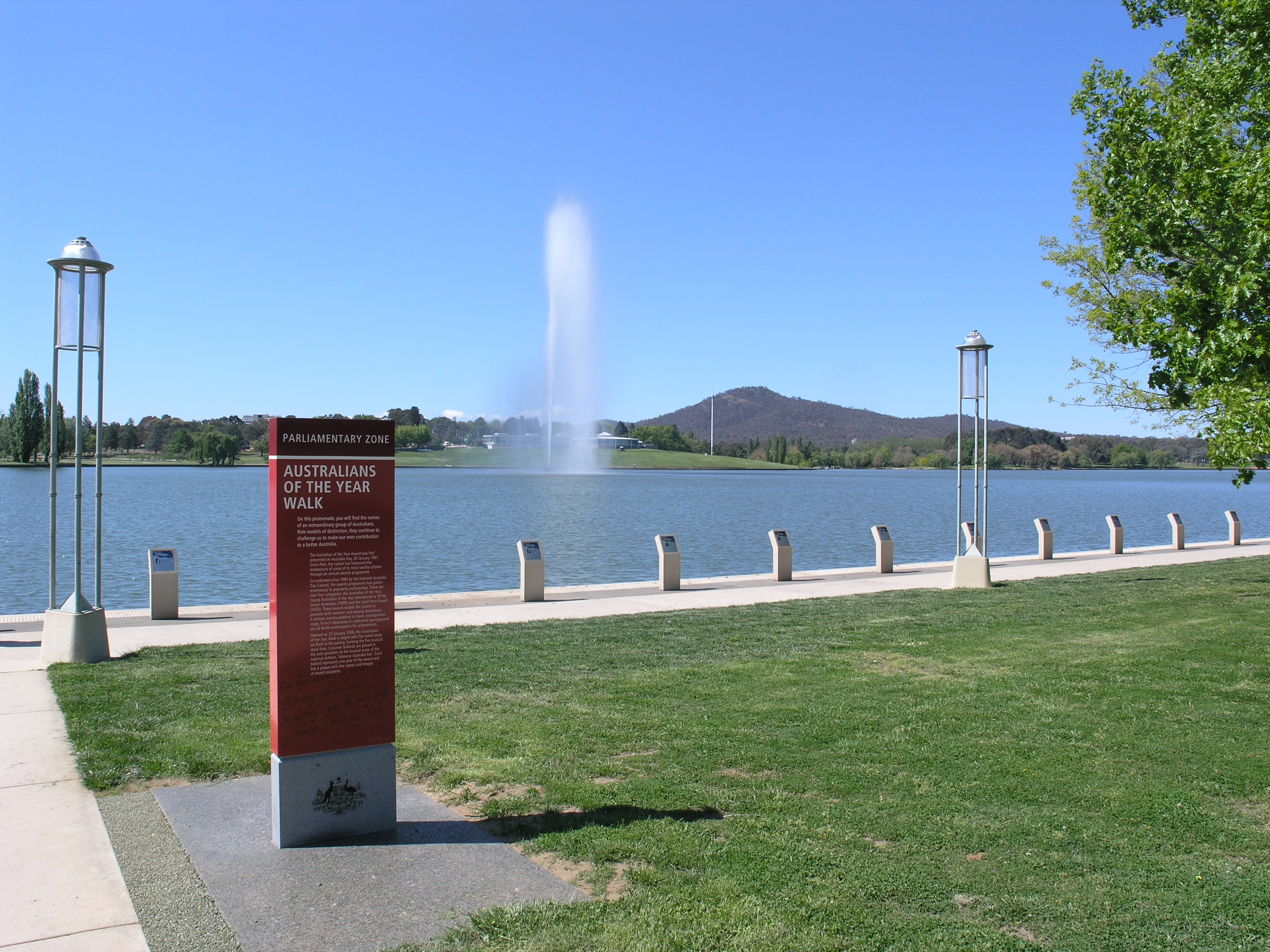
Australians of the Year Walk

The "Australians of the Year Walk" in Canberra, opened on Australia Day 2006, was designed by the National Capital Authority and comprises a series of plinths, seats and lighting. Incorporated in the pathway are five metal strips set flush in the concrete, representing the five music stave lines. The plinths are placed in musical note position to the score of the national anthem "Advance Australia Fair". Fixed to each plinth is an anodised aluminium plaque containing the names and images of an Australian of the Year, there is one plaque for each year of the award. The plaques are arranged chronologically, starting at the western end of the path near Commonwealth Avenue Bridge. The lakeside is bordered by white paving stones, the land side by a white paved walkway.

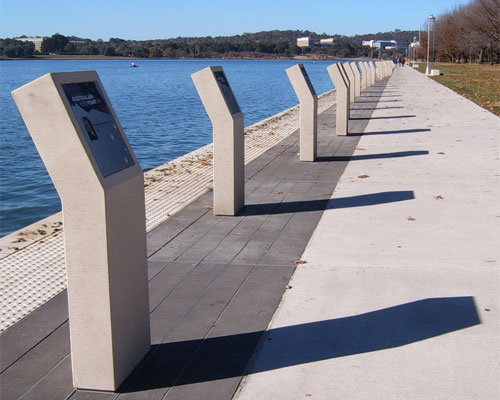
The Australians of the Year Walk is on the shore of Lake Burley Griffin, Canberra

The walk is situated along a straight section of shoreline on Lake Burley Griffin between the National Library of Australia and the Commonwealth Avenue Bridge (35.295°S 149.129°E).

The walk was opened by the then Prime Minister of Australia John Howard, on Australia Day, 26 January 2006.

In December 2007 journalist Mark McKenna visited the Australian of the Year Walk and interpreted it as a highly symbolic form of national memorial. The empty bollards stretching into the distance particularly intrigued him.

These blank plaques – memorials to the future – stand as if waiting for the years to pass before they can be filled in and become whole. Yet strangely they seem more intriguing than the plaques that precede them. It is possible to imagine the line of blank plaques stretching on endlessly, and their emptiness begs the question: What sort of nation will Australia become over the next few decades?

— Mark McKenna in The Monthly, March 2008.

== In popular culture ==
Not all of the debate and discussion generated by the awards program has been of a serious nature. A more light-hearted portrait can be found in the award-winning television satire We Can Be Heroes: Finding The Australian of the Year (2005), in which actor Chris Lilley plays five obscure nominees for the Australian of the Year award. One reviewer suggested that Lilley's creation was both a humorous mockumentary and a serious critique of the awards program.

== See also ==
- List of Australian of the Year Award recipients
- List of Young Australian of the Year Award recipients
- List of Senior Australian of the Year Award recipients
- List of Australian Local Hero Award recipients
- Orders, decorations, and medals of Australia
