= Raigh Roe =

Australian activist

Dame Raigh Roe DBE

World President of the Associated Country Women of the World
- In office 1977–1980

Personal details
- Born: Raigh Edith Kurts; 12 December 1922 Western Australia
- Died: 3 November 2014 (aged 91)
- Spouse: James Arthur Roe (m. 1941)
- Relations: John Septimus Roe (great-grandfather-in-law), Alwyn Kurts (brother)
- Children: Three sons
- Education: Perth Girls' School
- Occupation: Farmer
- Awards: Australian of the Year (1977)

Dame Raigh Edith Roe DBE (née Kurts; 12 December 1922 – 3 November 2014) was an Australian farmer, who became an advocate for rural women in Australia and around the world. She was member of the Australian Country Women's Association (CWA) from 1941; she became branch president, Western Australian state president and, eventually, national president of the CWA.

In 1977 she was elected World President of the Associated Country Women of the World (ACWW), representing almost nine million women in 74 countries throughout the world. In 1978, she was appointed as a commissioner for the Australian Broadcasting Commission (ABC).

A biography of Roe, She's No Milkmaid (ISBN 0859051528), written by Rica Erickson and Rona Haywood, was published by Hesperian Press in 1991.

== Honours ==
In 1975, Raigh Roe was appointed a Commander of the Order of the British Empire (CBE). In 1980, she was made a Dame Commander of the Order of the British Empire (DBE).

In 1977 she was named Australian of the Year, jointly with Sir Murray Tyrrell.

In 2001 she was awarded the Centenary Medal.

Awards
Preceded by Sir Edward Dunlop	Australian of the Year Award; 1977; Served alongside: Murray Tyrrell	Succeeded by Alan Bond; Galarrwuy Yunupingu
