= Electoral results for the district of Bathurst =

Election results for Bathurst, New South Wales, 1927alia

Bathurst, an electoral district of the Legislative Assembly in the Australian state of New South Wales, has continuously existed since 1859.

Election	Member	Party				
1859	John Clements	None				
1860	James Hart	None				
1864	James Kemp	None				
1866 by	William Suttor, Sr.	None				
1869	William Suttor, Sr.	None				
1872	Edward Combes	None				
1875	Francis Suttor	None				
1877	Francis Suttor	None				
1880	Francis Suttor	None				
1882	Francis Suttor	None				
1884 by	Francis Suttor	None				
1885	Francis Suttor	None				
1886 by	Francis Suttor	None				
1887	William Cortis	Free Trade				
1889	William Paul	Free Trade				
1891	Francis Suttor	Protectionist				
1894	Sydney Smith	Free Trade				
1894 by	Sydney Smith	Free Trade				
1895	Sydney Smith	Free Trade				
1898	Francis Suttor	Protectionist				
1900 by	William Young	Protectionist				
1901	William Young	Progressive				
1904	William Young	Progressive				
1907	John Miller	Liberal Reform				
1910	John Miller	Liberal Reform				
1913	Ernest Durack	Labor				
1917	Valentine Johnston	Labor	Member	Party	Member	Party
1920	Valentine Johnston	Labor	James Dooley	Labor	John Fitzpatrick	Nationalist
1922	Charles Rosenthal	Nationalist	James Dooley	Labor	John Fitzpatrick	Nationalist
1925	Gus Kelly	Labor	James Dooley	Labor	John Fitzpatrick	Nationalist
1927	Gus Kelly	Labor				
1930	Gus Kelly	Labor				
1932	Gordon Wilkins	Country				
1935	Gus Kelly	Labor (NSW)				
1938	Gus Kelly	Labor				
1941	Gus Kelly	Labor				
1944	Gus Kelly	Labor				
1947	Gus Kelly	Labor				
1950	Gus Kelly	Labor				
1953	Gus Kelly	Labor				
1956	Gus Kelly	Labor				
1959	Gus Kelly	Labor				
1962	Gus Kelly	Labor				
1965	Gus Kelly	Labor				
1967 by	Clive Osborne	Country				
1968	Clive Osborne	Country				
1971	Clive Osborne	Country				
1973	Clive Osborne	Country				
1976	Clive Osborne	Country				
1978	Clive Osborne	Country				
1981	Mick Clough	Labor				
1984	Mick Clough	Labor				
1988	David Berry	Liberal				
1991	Mick Clough	Labor				
1995	Mick Clough	Labor				
1999	Gerard Martin	Labor				
2003	Gerard Martin	Labor				
2007	Gerard Martin	Labor				
2011	Paul Toole	National				
2015	Paul Toole	National				
2019	Paul Toole	National				
2023	Paul Toole	National				

== Election results ==
=== Elections in the 2020s ===
==== 2023 ====
2023 New South Wales state election: Bathurst
Party	Candidate	Votes	%	±%
National	Paul Toole	29,873	57.0	+1.9
Labor	Cameron Shaw	8,442	16.1	−4.4
Shooters, Fishers, Farmers	Craig Sinclair	3,850	7.3	−7.4
Greens	Kay Nankervis	3,595	6.9	+1.3
Independent	Martin Ticehurst	3,449	6.6	+6.6
Legalise Cannabis	Antony Zbik	1,472	2.8	+2.8
Liberal Democrats	Burchell Wilson	1,092	2.1	+2.1
Sustainable Australia	Michael Begg	626	1.2	−1.4
Total formal votes		52,399	97.4	+0.4
Informal votes		1,400	2.6	−0.4
Turnout		53,799	90.5	−1.1
Two-party-preferred result
National	Paul Toole	32,850	73.6	+5.7
Labor	Cameron Shaw	11,801	26.4	−5.7
National hold		Swing	+5.7	

=== Elections in the 2010s ===
==== 2019 ====
2019 New South Wales state election: Bathurst
Party	Candidate	Votes	%	±%
National	Paul Toole	28,030	55.14	−4.75
Labor	Beau Riley	10,438	20.53	−6.84
Shooters, Fishers, Farmers	Brenden May	7,498	14.75	+14.75
Greens	David Harvey	2,815	5.54	−3.58
Sustainable Australia	Michael Begg	1,317	2.59	+2.59
Keep Sydney Open	Timothy Hansen	735	1.45	+1.45
Total formal votes		50,833	97.00	−0.37
Informal votes		1,574	3.00	+0.37
Turnout		52,407	92.20	−0.14
Two-party-preferred result
National	Paul Toole	30,130	67.90	+2.08
Labor	Beau Riley	14,242	32.10	−2.08
National hold		Swing	+2.08	

==== 2015 ====
2015 New South Wales state election: Bathurst
Party	Candidate	Votes	%	±%
National	Paul Toole	29,135	59.9	−7.4
Labor	Cass Coleman	13,314	27.4	+6.5
Greens	Tracey Carpenter	4,436	9.1	+2.9
Christian Democrats	Narelle Rigby	1,010	2.1	+2.1
No Land Tax	Tom Cripps	750	1.5	+1.5
Total formal votes		48,645	97.4	+0.0
Informal votes		1,314	2.6	−0.0
Turnout		49,959	92.3	+0.8
Two-party-preferred result
National	Paul Toole	30,241	65.8	−7.9
Labor	Cass Coleman	15,704	34.2	+7.9
National hold		Swing	−7.9	

==== 2011 ====
2011 New South Wales state election: Bathurst
Party	Candidate	Votes	%	±%
National	Paul Toole	30,777	67.2	+36.4
Labor	Dale Turner	9,607	21.0	−32.5
Greens	Diane Westerhuis	2,843	6.2	+1.4
Independent	Richard Trounson	2,596	5.7	+5.7
Total formal votes		45,823	97.9	−0.2
Informal votes		983	2.1	+0.2
Turnout		46,806	94.7	+0.8
Two-party-preferred result
National	Paul Toole	31,940	73.7	+36.7
Labor	Dale Turner	11,426	26.3	−36.7
National gain from Labor		Swing	+36.7	

=== Elections in the 2000s ===
==== 2007 ====
2007 New South Wales state election: Bathurst
Party	Candidate	Votes	%	±%
Labor	Gerard Martin	23,443	53.4	−0.8
National	Susan Williams	13,496	30.8	−0.6
Independent	Ray Thompson	4,816	11.0	+11.0
Greens	Sebria Lawrence	2,124	4.8	−1.4
Total formal votes		43,879	98.1	0.0
Informal votes		872	1.9	0.0
Turnout		44,751	93.9	
Two-party-preferred result
Labor	Gerard Martin	25,195	63.0	−0.2
National	Susan Williams	14,781	37.0	+0.2
Labor hold		Swing	−0.2	

==== 2003 ====
2003 New South Wales state election: Bathurst
Party	Candidate	Votes	%	±%
Labor	Gerard Martin	22,633	55.3	+4.3
National	Ann Thompson	12,822	31.3	+16.2
Greens	Brian Shoebridge	2,523	6.2	+4.1
Independent	David Simpson	1,059	2.6	+2.6
AAFI	John Wilkie	983	2.4	+1.9
Independent	Warren Rowe	894	2.2	+2.2
Total formal votes		40,914	98.0	−0.1
Informal votes		845	2.0	+0.1
Turnout		41,759	94.1	
Two-party-preferred result
Labor	Gerard Martin	24,285	64.1	−3.8
National	Ann Thompson	13,602	35.9	+3.8
Labor hold		Swing	−3.8	

=== Elections in the 1990s ===
==== 1999 ====
1999 New South Wales state election: Bathurst
Party	Candidate	Votes	%	±%
Labor	Gerard Martin	20,375	51.0	+5.7
National	Stan Wilson	6,018	15.1	−30.9
Liberal	David Berry	5,394	13.5	+13.5
One Nation	Warren Rowe	3,020	7.6	+7.6
Independent	Joe McGinnes	2,348	5.9	+5.9
Greens	Leonie Williams	847	2.1	−3.6
Democrats	Cecil Grivas	660	1.7	+1.7
Outdoor Recreation	Rod Gurney	493	1.2	+1.2
Independent	Michael Bray	348	0.9	+0.9
AAFI	Millman Ashton	191	0.5	−2.5
Citizens Electoral Council	David Simpson	149	0.4	+0.4
Non-Custodial Parents	Robert Thompson	100	0.3	+0.3
Total formal votes		39,943	98.0	+1.6
Informal votes		799	2.0	−1.6
Turnout		40,742	95.3	
Two-party-preferred result
Labor	Gerard Martin	22,433	67.8	+17.2
National	Stan Wilson	10,630	32.2	−17.2
Labor hold		Swing	+17.2	

==== 1995 ====
1995 New South Wales state election: Bathurst
Party	Candidate	Votes	%	±%
National	Trevor Toole	16,190	45.4	+45.4
Labor	Mick Clough	16,182	45.4	−2.8
Greens	Sharon Mullin	2,151	6.0	+6.0
AAFI	Carolyn O'Callaghan	1,134	3.2	+3.2
Total formal votes		35,657	96.7	+2.7
Informal votes		1,220	3.3	−2.7
Turnout		36,877	95.4	
Two-party-preferred result
Labor	Mick Clough	17,825	51.0	−4.1
National	Trevor Toole	17,136	49.0	+49.0
Labor hold		Swing	−4.1	

==== 1991 ====
1991 New South Wales state election: Bathurst
Party	Candidate	Votes	%	±%
Labor	Mick Clough	15,958	48.2	+8.6
Liberal	David Berry	12,822	38.7	+14.2
Country Residents	Mal Rich	2,211	6.7	+6.7
Democrats	John Merkel	2,143	6.5	+0.8
Total formal votes		33,134	94.0	−4.1
Informal votes		2,111	6.0	+4.1
Turnout		35,245	95.5	
Two-party-preferred result
Labor	Mick Clough	17,486	55.1	+10.3
Liberal	David Berry	14,239	44.9	−10.3
Labor gain from Liberal		Swing	+10.3	

=== Elections in the 1980s ===
==== 1988 ====
1988 New South Wales state election: Bathurst
Party	Candidate	Votes	%	±%
Labor	Mick Clough	12,876	41.5	−13.6
Liberal	David Berry	9,021	29.1	+29.1
National	Claud Wilson	7,060	22.8	−19.5
Democrats	Irene Langdon	2,075	6.7	+4.0
Total formal votes		31,032	98.2	−0.6
Informal votes		584	1.8	+0.6
Turnout		31,616	95.0	
Two-party-preferred result
Liberal	David Berry	15,489	52.2	+52.2
Labor	Mick Clough	14,190	47.8	−9.8
Liberal gain from Labor		Swing	+9.8	

==== 1984 ====
1984 New South Wales state election: Bathurst
Party	Candidate	Votes	%	±%
Labor	Mick Clough	17,400	52.9	+2.8
National	Clive Osborne	10,364	31.5	−18.4
National	Trevor Toole	4,298	13.1	+13.1
Democrats	Louis Winters	848	2.6	+2.6
Total formal votes		32,910	98.8	+0.8
Informal votes		392	1.2	−0.8
Turnout		33,302	94.6	+0.9
Two-party-preferred result
Labor	Mick Clough		55.3	+5.2
National	Clive Osborne		44.7	−5.2
Labor hold		Swing	+5.2	

==== 1981 ====
1981 New South Wales state election: Bathurst
Party	Candidate	Votes	%	±%
Labor	Mick Clough	15,865	50.1	−7.6
National Country	Clive Osborne	15,834	49.9	+7.6
Total formal votes		31,699	98.0	
Informal votes		630	2.0	
Turnout		32,329	93.7	
Labor notional hold		Swing	−7.6	

The sitting member was Clive Osborne (National Country), however Bathurst had become notionally held by Labor due to the redistribution.

=== Elections in the 1970s ===
==== 1978 ====
1978 New South Wales state election: Bathurst
Party	Candidate	Votes	%	±%
National Country	Clive Osborne	12,261	52.7	+2.2
Labor	Mark Worthington	11,001	47.3	+3.2
Total formal votes		23,262	98.9	−0.2
Informal votes		254	1.1	+0.2
Turnout		23,516	94.5	−0.8
National Country hold		Swing	−0.3	

==== 1976 ====
1976 New South Wales state election: Bathurst
Party	Candidate	Votes	%	±%
Country	Clive Osborne	11,416	50.5	−9.4
Labor	Mark Worthington	9,965	44.1	+7.6
Independent	Peter Foster	1,215	5.4	+5.4
Total formal votes		22,596	99.1	+0.3
Informal votes		209	0.9	−0.3
Turnout		22,805	95.3	−0.3
Two-party-preferred result
Country	Clive Osborne	11,981	53.0	−9.8
Labor	Mark Worthington	10,615	47.0	+9.8
Country hold		Swing	−9.8	

==== 1973 ====
1973 New South Wales state election: Bathurst
Party	Candidate	Votes	%	±%
Country	Clive Osborne	12,659	59.9	+9.2
Labor	Maxwell Hanrahan	7,698	36.5	−8.3
Democratic Labor	John O'Grady	765	3.6	+3.6
Total formal votes		21,122	98.8	
Informal votes		259	1.2	
Turnout		21,381	95.6	
Two-party-preferred result
Country	Clive Osborne	13,271	62.8	+10.9
Labor	Maxwell Hanrahan	7,851	37.2	−10.9
Country hold		Swing	+10.9	

==== 1971 ====
1971 New South Wales state election: Bathurst
Party	Candidate	Votes	%	±%
Country	Clive Osborne	9,631	50.7	−7.9
Labor	Michael Connolly	8,503	44.8	+3.4
Australia	Deryck Barnes	849	4.5	+4.5
Total formal votes		18,983	98.9	
Informal votes		212	1.1	
Turnout		19,195	96.2	
Two-party-preferred result
Country	Clive Osborne	9,843	51.9	−6.7
Labor	Michael Connolly	9,140	48.1	+6.7
Country hold		Swing	−6.7	

=== Elections in the 1960s ===
==== 1968 ====
1968 New South Wales state election: Bathurst
Party	Candidate	Votes	%	±%
Country	Clive Osborne	11,245	56.1	+27.6
Labor	Ken Fry	8,814	43.9	−8.2
Total formal votes		20,059	98.5	
Informal votes		314	1.5	
Turnout		20,373	96.9	
Country gain from Labor		Swing	+11.4	

Gus Kelly (Labor) died in 1967 and Clive Osborne (Country) won the seat at the resulting by-election.

==== 1967 by-election ====
1967 Bathurst state by-election
Party	Candidate	Votes	%	±%
Labor	Michael Connolly	6,952	43.8	−8.3
Country	Clive Osborne	5,868	37.0	+8.5
Liberal	John Matthews	2,967	18.7	−0.6
Independent	Keith James	73	0.46	
Total formal votes		15,860	98.8	−9.1
Informal votes		193	1.2	−1.0
Turnout		16,053	92.4	−3.3
Two-party-preferred result
Country	Clive Osborne	8,532	53.8	+7.5
Labor	Michael Connolly	7,328	46.2	−7.5
Country gain from Labor		Swing	+7.5	

Gus Kelly (Labor) died.

==== 1965 ====
1965 New South Wales state election: Bathurst
Party	Candidate	Votes	%	±%
Labor	Gus Kelly	8,622	52.1	−9.9
Country	Clive Osborne	4,716	28.5	+28.5
Liberal	French Smith	3,199	19.3	−18.7
Total formal votes		16,537	99.1	−0.2
Informal votes		157	0.9	+0.2
Turnout		16,694	95.7	−0.5
Two-party-preferred result
Labor	Gus Kelly	8,878	53.7	−8.3
Country	Clive Osborne	7,659	46.3	+8.3
Labor hold		Swing	−8.3	

==== 1962 ====
1962 New South Wales state election: Bathurst
Party	Candidate	Votes	%	±%
Labor	Gus Kelly	10,251	62.0	+2.6
Liberal	Campbell Alexander	6,283	38.0	−2.6
Total formal votes		16,534	99.3	
Informal votes		124	0.7	
Turnout		16,658	96.2	
Labor hold		Swing	+2.6	

=== Elections in the 1950s ===
==== 1959 ====
1959 New South Wales state election: Bathurst
Party	Candidate	Votes	%	±%
Labor	Gus Kelly	9,789	59.4	
Liberal	Campbell Alexander	6,686	40.6	
Total formal votes		16,475	99.1	
Informal votes		143	0.9	
Turnout		16,618	95.7	
Labor hold		Swing		

==== 1956 ====
1956 New South Wales state election: Bathurst
Party	Candidate	Votes	%	±%
Labor	Gus Kelly	10,340	63.2	−36.8
Liberal	Jack Toole	6,028	36.8	+36.8
Total formal votes		16,368	99.1	
Informal votes		147	0.9	
Turnout		16,515	95.5	
Labor hold		Swing	N/A	

==== 1953 ====
1953 New South Wales state election: Bathurst
Party	Candidate	Votes	%	±%
Labor	Gus Kelly	unopposed		
Labor hold				

==== 1950 ====
1950 New South Wales state election: Bathurst
Party	Candidate	Votes	%	±%
Labor	Gus Kelly	9,348	58.5	
Liberal	Basil Genders	4,185	26.2	
Country	Allan Harding	2,459	15.4	
Total formal votes		15,992	99.0	
Informal votes		167	1.0	
Turnout		16,159	94.8	
Two-party-preferred result
Labor	Gus Kelly		60.0 (Note: Two party preferred vote was estimated.)	
Liberal	Basil Genders		40.0	
Labor hold		Swing		

=== Elections in the 1940s ===
==== 1947 ====
1947 New South Wales state election: Bathurst
Party	Candidate	Votes	%	±%
Labor	Gus Kelly	8,802	59.1	−2.2
Liberal	Walter L'Estrange	6,105	40.9	+40.9
Total formal votes		14,907	98.8	+0.9
Informal votes		184	1.2	−0.9
Turnout		15,091	96.0	+6.3
Labor hold		Swing	−2.2	

==== 1944 ====
1944 New South Wales state election: Bathurst
Party	Candidate	Votes	%	±%
Labor	Gus Kelly	8,579	61.3	−38.7
Country	Archibald Gardiner	5,421	38.7	+38.7
Total formal votes		14,000	97.9	
Informal votes		297	2.1	
Turnout		14,297	89.7	
Labor hold		Swing	N/A	

==== 1941 ====
1941 New South Wales state election: Bathurst
Party	Candidate	Votes	%	±%
Labor	Gus Kelly	unopposed		
Labor hold				

=== Elections in the 1930s ===
==== 1938 ====
1938 New South Wales state election: Bathurst
Party	Candidate	Votes	%	±%
Labor	Gus Kelly	7,455	54.2	+16.2
United Australia	Thomas Mutch	4,789	34.8	+34.8
Country	Roland Green	1,504	10.9	−33.2
Total formal votes		13,748	98.3	−0.1
Informal votes		236	1.7	+0.1
Turnout		13,984	96.6	−1.0
Labor hold		Swing	N/A	

- Preferences were not distributed.

==== 1935 ====
1935 New South Wales state election: Bathurst
Party	Candidate	Votes	%	±%
Country	Gordon Wilkins (defeated)	6,141	44.1	−4.9
Labor (NSW)	Gus Kelly	5,298	38.0	−9.4
Federal Labor	Martin Griffin	2,492	17.9	+17.9
Total formal votes		13,931	98.4	+0.5
Informal votes		219	1.6	−0.5
Turnout		14,150	97.6	−0.1
Two-party-preferred result
Labor (NSW)	Gus Kelly	7,190	51.6	+2.8
Country	Gordon Wilkins	6,741	48.4	−2.8
Labor (NSW) gain from Country		Swing	+2.8	

==== 1932 ====
1932 New South Wales state election: Bathurst
Party	Candidate	Votes	%	±%
Country	Gordon Wilkins	6,441	49.0	+9.5
Labor (NSW)	Gus Kelly	6,239	47.4	−12.8
Independent	John Miller	366	2.8	+2.8
Independent	Eric Ingram	108	0.8	+0.8
Total formal votes		13,154	97.9	−0.2
Informal votes		288	2.1	+0.2
Turnout		13,442	97.7	+3.4
Two-party-preferred result
Country	Gordon Wilkins	6,732	51.2	
Labor (NSW)	Gus Kelly	6,422	48.8	
Country gain from Labor (NSW)		Swing	N/A	

- Gordon Wilkins was endorsed jointly by the Country and United Australia Parties.

==== 1930 ====
1930 New South Wales state election: Bathurst
Party	Candidate	Votes	%	±%
Labor	Gus Kelly	7,487	60.2	
Nationalist	Arthur Brown	4,909	39.5	
Communist	Andrew Goldsmith	40	0.3	
Total formal votes		12,436	98.1	
Informal votes		235	1.9	
Turnout		12,671	94.3	
Labor hold		Swing		

=== Elections in the 1920s ===
==== 1927 ====
This section is an excerpt from 1927 New South Wales state election § Bathurst

1927 New South Wales state election: Bathurst
Party	Candidate	Votes	%	±%
Labor	Gus Kelly	6,508	55.1	
Nationalist	Arthur Brown	5,301	44.9	
Total formal votes		11,809	96.6	
Informal votes		414	3.4	
Turnout		12,223	84.7	
Labor win		(new seat)		

==== 1925 ====
This section is an excerpt from 1925 New South Wales state election § Bathurst

1925 New South Wales state election: Bathurst
Party	Candidate	Votes	%	±%
Quota		7,461		
Labor	James Dooley (elected 1)	9,378	31.4	+5.2
Labor	Gus Kelly (elected 2)	3,940	13.2	+12.0
Labor	Hamilton Knight	2,333	7.8	+7.8
Nationalist	John Fitzpatrick (elected 3)	7,155	24.0	−4.7
Nationalist	Charles Rosenthal (defeated)	3,540	11.9	−1.0
Nationalist	James Beddie	3,495	11.7	+11.7
Total formal votes		29,841	97.4	+1.1
Informal votes		789	2.6	−1.1
Turnout		30,630	71.5	+0.4
Party total votes
Labor		15,651	52.4	+5.5
Nationalist		14,190	47.6	+3.1

==== 1922 ====
This section is an excerpt from 1922 New South Wales state election § Bathurst

1922 New South Wales state election: Bathurst
Party	Candidate	Votes	%	±%
Quota		7,351		
Labor	James Dooley (elected 2)	7,708	26.2	−5.0
Labor	Valentine Johnston (defeated)	5,745	19.5	−2.6
Labor	Gus Kelly	337	1.2	+1.2
Nationalist	John Fitzpatrick (elected 1)	8,449	28.7	+3.2
Nationalist	Charles Rosenthal (elected 3)	3,808	12.9	+12.9
Nationalist	Alfred Craig	816	2.8	+2.8
Progressive	Arthur Brown	1,162	3.9	−4.1
Progressive	Samuel Whitmee	903	3.1	+3.1
Progressive	Alfred Birney	348	1.2	+1.2
Progressive	Frederic Swann	125	0.4	+0.4
Total formal votes		29,401	96.3	+1.5
Informal votes		1,134	3.7	−1.5
Turnout		30,535	71.1	+8.7
Party total votes
Labor		13,790	46.9	−6.4
Nationalist		13,073	44.5	+11.7
Progressive		2,538	8.6	−4.6

==== 1920 ====
This section is an excerpt from 1920 New South Wales state election § Bathurst

1920 New South Wales state election: Bathurst
Party	Candidate	Votes	%	±%
Quota		5,912		
Labor	James Dooley (elected 1)	7,380	31.2	
Labor	Valentine Johnston (elected 3)	5,224	22.1	
Labor	John Gilchrist	88	0.4	
Nationalist	John Fitzpatrick (elected 2)	6,029	25.5	
Nationalist	Henry Camfield	1,723	7.3	
Progressive	Arthur Brown	1,888	8.0	
Progressive	Albert Rogers	1,244	5.3	
Independent	James McIntyre	70	0.3	
Total formal votes		23,646	94.8	
Informal votes		1,285	5.2	
Turnout		24,931	62.4	
Party total votes
Labor		12,692	53.7	
Nationalist		7,752	32.8	
Progressive		3,132	13.2	
Independent	James McIntyre	70	0.3	

=== Elections in the 1910s ===
==== 1917 ====
This section is an excerpt from 1917 New South Wales state election § Bathurst

1917 New South Wales state election: Bathurst
Party	Candidate	Votes	%	±%
Labor	Valentine Johnston	3,805	51.9	+1.7
Nationalist	John Miller	3,114	42.4	−7.4
Independent	John Sullivan	417	5.7	+5.7
Total formal votes		7,336	99.0	+2.0
Informal votes		75	1.0	−2.0
Turnout		7,411	72.3	−3.5
Labor hold		Swing	+1.7	

The sitting member was Ernest Durack (Labor) who did not contest the election.

==== 1913 ====
This section is an excerpt from 1913 New South Wales state election § Bathurst

1913 New South Wales state election: Bathurst
Party	Candidate	Votes	%	±%
Labor	Ernest Durack	3,678	50.2	
Farmers and Settlers	John Miller (Note: Also endorsed by Liberal Reform.)	3,645	49.8	
Total formal votes		7,323	97.0	
Informal votes		228	3.0	
Turnout		7,551	75.8	
Labor gain from Liberal Reform				

==== 1910 ====
This section is an excerpt from 1910 New South Wales state election § Bathurst

1910 New South Wales state election: Bathurst
Party	Candidate	Votes	%	±%
Liberal Reform	John Miller	3,013	53.0	
Labour	Joseph Coates	2,670	47.0	
Total formal votes		5,683	98.2	
Informal votes		102	1.8	
Turnout		5,785	70.6	
Liberal Reform hold				

=== Elections in the 1900s ===
==== 1907 ====
This section is an excerpt from 1907 New South Wales state election § Bathurst

1907 New South Wales state election: Bathurst
Party	Candidate	Votes	%	±%
Liberal Reform	John Miller	2,613	52.4	+6.5
Former Progressive	William Young	2,372	47.6	−6.5
Total formal votes		4,985	96.3	
Informal votes		193	3.7	
Turnout		5,178	73.4	
Liberal Reform gain from Progressive		Swing	+6.5	

==== 1904 ====
This section is an excerpt from 1904 New South Wales state election § Bathurst

1904 New South Wales state election: Bathurst
Party	Candidate	Votes	%	±%
Progressive	William Young	2,788	54.1	
Liberal Reform	Sir James Graham	2,367	45.9	
Total formal votes		5,155	99.4	
Informal votes		31	0.6	
Turnout		5,186	67.0	
Progressive hold				

Bathurst was expanded to include part of The Macquarie. It was held by William Young (Progressive). The member for The Macquarie was William Hurley (Progressive) who was appointed to the Legislative Council.

==== 1901 ====
This section is an excerpt from 1901 New South Wales state election § Bathurst

1901 New South Wales state election: Bathurst
Party	Candidate	Votes	%	±%
Progressive	William Young	958	51.6	−1.1
Liberal Reform	George Machattie	890	47.9	+0.6
Independent	Jacob Innes	9	0.5	
Total formal votes		1,857	98.1	−1.3
Informal votes		37	2.0	1.3
Turnout		1,894	72.9	−0.4
Progressive hold				

==== 1900 by-election ====
1900 Bathurst by-election Monday 25 June
Party	Candidate	Votes	%	±%
Protectionist	William Young	770	56.87	
Free Trade	Alfred Thompson	571	42.17	
Independent	Alexander Warden	13	0.96	
Total formal votes		1,354	97.90	
Informal votes		29	2.10	
Turnout		1,383	52.05	
Protectionist hold				

Protectionist party member Francis Suttor was appointed to the Legislative Council. William Young, while a member of the Protectionist party was also endorsed by the Labour party. Alfred Thompson, whilst a Free Trader, was nominated by the Ministerialist faction of Sir William Lyne's protectionist government.

=== Elections in the 1890s ===
==== 1898 ====
This section is an excerpt from 1898 New South Wales colonial election § Bathurst

1898 New South Wales colonial election: Bathurst
Party	Candidate	Votes	%	±%
National Federal	Francis Suttor	995	52.7	
Free Trade	Sydney Smith	892	47.3	
Total formal votes		1,887	99.3	
Informal votes		14	0.7	
Turnout		1,901	73.3	
National Federal gain from Free Trade				

==== 1895 ====
This section is an excerpt from 1895 New South Wales colonial election § Bathurst

1895 New South Wales colonial election: Bathurst
Party	Candidate	Votes	%	±%
Free Trade	Sydney Smith	939	55.8	
Protectionist	Jack FitzGerald	745	44.2	
Total formal votes		1,684	99.5	
Informal votes		9	0.5	
Turnout		1,693	72.5	
Free Trade hold				

==== 1894 by-election ====
1894 Bathurst by-election Saturday 11 August
Party	Candidate	Votes	%	±%
Free Trade	Sydney Smith (re-elected)	951	77.4	+27.7
Independent Labour	James Walker	277	22.6	+10.6
Total formal votes		1,228	99.1	+0.1
Informal votes		11	0.9	−0.1
Turnout		1,239	51.5 (Note: Estimate based on a roll of 2,031 at the 1894 election.)	−32.7
Free Trade hold				

Sydney Smith (Free Trade) was appointed Secretary for Mines and Agriculture in the Reid ministry.

==== 1894 ====
1894 New South Wales colonial election: Bathurst
Party	Candidate	Votes	%	±%
Free Trade	Sydney Smith	995	49.7	
Protectionist	Francis Suttor	767	38.3	
Independent Labour	James Walker	241	12.0	
Total formal votes		2,003	99.0	
Informal votes		21	1.0	
Turnout		2,024	84.2	
Free Trade gain from Protectionist				

==== 1891 ====
This section is an excerpt from 1891 New South Wales colonial election § Bathurst

1891 New South Wales colonial election: Bathurst Wednesday 17 June
Party	Candidate	Votes	%	±%
Protectionist	Francis Suttor (elected)	789	51.8	
Free Trade	William Paul (defeated)	733	48.2	
Total formal votes		1,522	99.1	
Informal votes		14	0.9	
Turnout		1,536	75.9	
Protectionist gain from Free Trade				

=== Elections in the 1880s ===
==== 1889 ====
This section is an excerpt from 1889 New South Wales colonial election § Bathurst

1889 New South Wales colonial election: Bathurst Saturday 2 February
Party	Candidate	Votes	%	±%
Free Trade	William Paul (elected)	736	52.3	
Protectionist	Francis Suttor	672	47.7	
Total formal votes		1,408	98.8	
Informal votes		17	1.2	
Turnout		1,425	72.8	
Free Trade hold				

==== 1887 ====
This section is an excerpt from 1887 New South Wales colonial election § Bathurst

1887 New South Wales colonial election: Bathurst Wednesday 9 February
Party	Candidate	Votes	%	±%
Free Trade	William Cortis (elected)	773	59.9	
Protectionist	Francis Suttor (defeated)	517	40.1	
Total formal votes		1,290	98.6	
Informal votes		18	1.4	
Turnout		1,308	70.2	

==== 1886 by-election ====
1886 Bathurst by-election Tuesday 9 March
Candidate	Votes	%
Francis Suttor (re-elected)	568	60.6
Daniel Mayne	369	39.4
Total formal votes	937	98.4
Informal votes	15	1.6
Turnout	952	53.7

Francis Suttor was appointed Postmaster-General in the Jennings ministry.

==== 1885 ====
This section is an excerpt from 1885 New South Wales colonial election § Bathurst

1885 New South Wales colonial election: Bathurst Friday 23 October
Candidate	Votes	%
Francis Suttor (re-elected)	866	65.2
John Meagher	463	34.8
Total formal votes	1,329	98.4
Informal votes	21	1.6
Turnout	1,350	76.1

==== 1884 by-election ====
1884 Bathurst by-election Friday 8 February
Candidate	Votes	%
Francis Suttor (re-elected)	unopposed	

The Committee of Elections and Qualifications held that an error in the drafting of the constitution meant that Francis Suttor could not be validly appointed Minister of Public Instruction and declared his seat vacant.

==== 1882 ====
This section is an excerpt from 1882 New South Wales colonial election § Bathurst

1882 New South Wales colonial election: Bathurst Saturday 2 December
Candidate	Votes	%
Francis Suttor (re-elected)	504	50.8
Thomas Hellyer	488	49.2
Total formal votes	992	97.7
Informal votes	23	2.3
Turnout	1,015	69.4

==== 1880 ====
This section is an excerpt from 1880 New South Wales colonial election § Bathurst

1880 New South Wales colonial election: Bathurst Friday 19 November
Candidate	Votes	%
Francis Suttor (re-elected)	641	58.9
William Butler	447	41.1
Total formal votes	1,088	97.6
Informal votes	27	2.4
Turnout	1,115	78.2

=== Elections in the 1870s ===
==== 1877 ====
This section is an excerpt from 1877 New South Wales colonial election § Bathurst

1877 New South Wales colonial election: Bathurst Monday 29 October
Candidate	Votes	%
Francis Suttor (re-elected)	551	64.1
David Williamson	308	35.9
Total formal votes	859	98.1
Informal votes	17	1.9
Turnout	876	51.9

==== 1874-75 ====
This section is an excerpt from 1874-75 New South Wales colonial election § Bathurst

1874–75 New South Wales colonial election: Bathurst Saturday 2 January 1875
Candidate	Votes	%
Francis Suttor (elected)	555	59.2
Edmund Webb (defeated)	383	40.8
Total formal votes	938	100.0
Informal votes	0	0.0
Turnout	968	72.9

The sitting member for Bathurst Edward Combes did not contest the election. Edmund Webb was the sitting member for West Macquarie.

==== 1872 ====
This section is an excerpt from 1872 New South Wales colonial election § Bathurst

1872 New South Wales colonial election: Bathurst Friday 23 February
Candidate	Votes	%
Edward Combes (elected)	389	56.4
Henry Rotton	301	43.6
Total formal votes	690	98.3
Informal votes	12	1.7
Turnout	702	61.0

=== Elections in the 1860s ===
==== 1869-70 ====
This section is an excerpt from 1869-70 New South Wales colonial election § Bathurst

1869–70 New South Wales colonial election: Bathurst Wednesday 22 December 1869
Candidate	Votes	%
William Suttor (re-elected)	unopposed	

==== 1866 by-election ====
1866 Bathurst by-election Friday 21 December
Candidate	Votes	%
William Suttor, Sr. (elected)	unopposed	

James Kemp resigned.

==== 1864-65 ====
This section is an excerpt from 1864–65 New South Wales colonial election § Bathurst

1864–65 New South Wales colonial election: Bathurst Wednesday 21 December 1864
Candidate	Votes	%
James Kemp (elected)	344	58.4
Henry Rotton (defeated)	245	41.6
Total formal votes	589	100.0
Informal votes	0	0.0
Turnout	589	51.7

==== 1860 ====
This section is an excerpt from 1860 New South Wales colonial election § Bathurst

1860 New South Wales colonial election: Bathurst Thursday 6 December
Candidate	Votes	%
James Hart (re-elected)	341	69.5
Henry Rotton (defeated)	113	23.0
John McGuigan	37	7.5
Total formal votes	491	98.0
Informal votes	10	2.0
Turnout	501	58.7

=== Elections in the 1850s ===
==== 1859 ====
This section is an excerpt from 1859 New South Wales colonial election § Bathurst

1859 New South Wales colonial election: Bathurst Thursday 9 June
Candidate	Votes	%
John Clements (elected)	348	55.6
Henry Rotton (defeated)	278	44.4
Total formal votes	626	100.0
Informal votes	0	0.0
Turnout	626	68.9
