= 1886 Bathurst colonial by-election =

By-election in New South Wales, Australia

A by-election was held for the New South Wales Legislative Assembly electorate of Bathurst on 9 March 1886 as a result of the appointment of Francis Suttor to the office of Postmaster-General in the Jennings ministry. Under the constitution, ministers in the Legislative Assembly were required to resign to recontest their seats in a by-election when appointed. Such ministerial by-elections were usually uncontested and on this occasion a poll was required for Bathurst and Redfern where Arthur Renwick was re-elected. The 7 other ministers were re-elected unopposed.

== Dates ==
Date	Event
26 February 1886	Jennings ministry appointed.
3 March 1886	Writ of election issued by the Speaker of the Legislative Assembly.
6 March 1886	Nominations.
9 March 1886	Polling day
24 March 1886	Return of writ

== Result ==
1886 Bathurst by-election Tuesday 9 March
Candidate	Votes	%
Francis Suttor (re-elected)	568	60.6
Daniel Mayne	369	39.4
Total formal votes	937	98.4
Informal votes	15	1.6
Turnout	952	53.7

== See also ==
- Electoral results for the district of Bathurst
- List of New South Wales state by-elections
