= 1967 Bathurst state by-election =

Election result for Bathurst, New South Wales, Australia

A by-election was held for the New South Wales Legislative Assembly electorate of Bathurst on 6 May 1967 following the death of Gus Kelly (Labor).

== Dates ==
Date	Event
25 March 1967	Death of Gus Kelly.
7 April 1967	Writ of election issued by the Speaker of the Legislative Assembly.
13 April 1967	Day of nomination
6 May 1967	Polling day
5 June 1967	Return of writ

== Results ==
1967 Bathurst state by-election
Party	Candidate	Votes	%	±%
Labor	Michael Connolly	6,952	43.8	−8.3
Country	Clive Osborne	5,868	37.0	+8.5
Liberal	John Matthews	2,967	18.7	−0.6
Independent	Keith James	73	0.46	
Total formal votes		15,860	98.8	−9.1
Informal votes		193	1.2	−1.0
Turnout		16,053	92.4	−3.3
Two-party-preferred result
Country	Clive Osborne	8,532	53.8	+7.5
Labor	Michael Connolly	7,328	46.2	−7.5
Country gain from Labor		Swing	+7.5	

== See also ==
- Electoral results for the district of Bathurst
- List of New South Wales state by-elections
