= 1900 Bathurst colonial by-election =

Election result for Bathurst, New South Wales, Australia

A by-election was held for the New South Wales Legislative Assembly electorate of Bathurst on 25 June 1900 when Protectionist party member Francis Suttor was appointed to the Legislative Council.

== Dates ==
| Date | Event |
|---|---|
| 12 June 1900 | Writ of election issued by the Speaker of the Legislative Assembly. |
| 19 June 1900 | Day of nomination |
| 25 June 1900 | Polling day |
| 2 July 1900 | Return of writ |

== Results ==
1900 Bathurst by-election Monday 25 June
| Party | Candidate | Votes | % | ±% |
|---|---|---|---|---|
| Protectionist | William Young | 770 | 56.87 | |
| Free Trade | Alfred Thompson | 571 | 42.17 | |
| Independent | Alexander Warden | 13 | 0.96 | |
| Total formal votes | | 1,354 | 97.90 | |
| Informal votes | | 29 | 2.10 | |
| Turnout | | 1,383 | 52.05 | |
| Protectionist hold | | | | |

William Young, while a member of the Protectionist party was also endorsed by the Labour party. Alfred Thompson, whilst a Free Trader, was nominated by the Ministerialist faction of Sir William Lyne's protectionist government.

== See also ==
- Electoral results for the district of Bathurst
- List of New South Wales state by-elections
