= Paul Singer (disambiguation) =

Paul Singer (born 1944) is the founder of hedge fund Elliott Management Corporation.

Paul Singer may also refer to:

- Paul Singer (public servant), Australian public servant, Official Secretary to the Governor-General of Australia
- Paul Singer (politician) (1844–1911), German politician, co-leader of the SPD
- Paul Singer (economist) (1932–2018), Austrian-born Brazilian economist and scholar
- Paul Singer (American football) (born 1966), American football player
