= 1886 Redfern colonial by-election =

By-election in New South Wales, Australia

A by-election was held for the New South Wales Legislative Assembly electorate of Redfern on 9 March 1886 because Arthur Renwick was appointed Minister of Public Instruction in the ministry of Sir Patrick Jennings. Under the constitution, ministers in the Legislative Assembly were required to resign to recontest their seats in a by-election when appointed. Such ministerial by-elections were usually uncontested and on this occasion a poll was required for Redfern and Bathurst where Francis Suttor was easily re-elected. The 7 other ministers were re-elected unopposed.

== Dates ==
Date	Event
26 February 1886	Jennings ministry appointed.
3 March 1886	Writ of election issued by the Speaker of the Legislative Assembly.
6 March 1886	Nominations.
9 March 1886	Polling day
24 March 1886	Return of writ

== Result ==
1886 Redfern by-election Tuesday, 9 March
Candidate	Votes	%
Arthur Renwick (re-elected)	1,769	53.8
William Stephen	1,522	46.2
Total formal votes	3,291	98.7
Informal votes	42	1.3
Turnout	3,333	43.4

== See also ==
- Electoral results for the district of Redfern
- List of New South Wales state by-elections
