= 1866 Bathurst colonial by-election =

By-election in New South Wales, Australia

A by-election was held for the New South Wales Legislative Assembly electorate of Bathurst on 21 December 1866 because James Kemp resigned.

== Results ==
1866 Bathurst by-election Friday 21 December
Candidate	Votes	%
William Suttor, Sr. (elected)	unopposed	

== See also ==
- Electoral results for the district of Bathurst
- List of New South Wales state by-elections
