= Gerard Martin =

Gerard Martin may refer to:

- Gerard Martin (politician) (born 1946), Australian politician
- Gerard Martin (public servant), Australian public servant
- Gerard Martín (footballer) (born 2002), Spanish footballer

== See also ==
- Gerald Martin (born 1944), British literary critic
