= 1884 East Sydney colonial by-election =

By-election in New South Wales, Australia

A by-election was held for the New South Wales Legislative Assembly electorate of East Sydney on 29 February 1884 as a result of the Legislative Assembly declaring the seats of Francis Suttor, and George Reid, were vacant as a result of a report of the Committee of Elections and Qualifications that they were incapable of being elected, or of sitting, or voting, as a member of the Assembly.

At the time the Constitution provided that:

XVIII. Any person holding any Office of Profit under the Crown, or having a Pension from the Crown during Pleasure or for Term of Years, shall be incapable of being elected, or of sitting or voting as a Member of the Legislative Assembly, unless he be One of the following official Members of the Government, that is to say, the Colonial Secretary, Colonial Treasurer, Auditor General, Attorney General, and Solicitor General, or One of such additional Officers, not being more than Five, as the Governor, with the advice of the Executive Council, may from Time to Time, by a notice in the Government Gazette, declare capable of being elected a Member of the said Assembly.

Adolphus Taylor argued that the Governor had already issued five proclamations prior to the appointment of Suttor and thus the appointments of Suttor and Reid to the office of Minister of Public Instruction meant they were disqualified. The Elections and Qualifications Committee agreed, declaring that both Suttor and Reid held an office of profit under the crown and they were both disqualified from holding office.

The Protection and Political Reform League had intended to nominate Richard Luscombe, however he was withheld to avoid splitting the protectionist vote.

== Result ==
1884 East Sydney by-election Friday 29 February
Candidate	Votes	%
Sydney Burdekin (elected)	2,138	50.5
George Reid (defeated)	2,098	49.5
Total formal votes	4,236	98.7
Informal votes	54	1.3
Turnout	4,290	48.1

== Aftermath ==
While Reid was defeated, Suttor was unopposed in the Bathurst by-election. The errors were remedied by the Constitution Act Amendment Act 1884.

Reid did not regain a seat in Parliament until the October 1885 election.
