= Mark Fraser (secretary) =

Australian public servant and diplomat

Mark Fraser AO, CVO
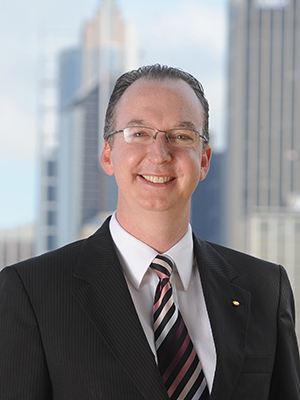

11th Official Secretary to the Governor-General of Australia
- In office 27 June 2014 – 18 August 2018
- Monarch: Elizabeth II
- Governor-General: Sir Peter Cosgrove
- Preceded by: Stephen Brady
- Succeeded by: Paul Singer

Personal details
- Born: Mark Thomas Fraser; 6 March 1975 (age 51) Hobart, Tasmania, Australia
- Education: Monash University; Bond University

Mark Thomas Fraser AO, CVO (born 6 March 1975) is an Australian public servant and diplomat. He was the Official Secretary to the Governor-General of Australia, General Sir Peter Cosgrove, from June 2014 to August 2018. He is presently Chief Executive Officer of the National Australia Day Council.

== Early life ==
Fraser was born in Hobart, Tasmania in 1975.

Fraser was educated at Bond University, obtaining a Bachelor of Arts in international relations, journalism and public relations in 1994. He graduated with a Masters in Foreign Affairs and Trade from Monash University in 2001. He has a Global Executive Masters in Business Administration from the University of Sydney (2013).

== Career ==
Fraser has served in several senior diplomatic positions, including as Consul-General in the Netherlands (2004–2007) and Consul in Turkey (1998–2001).

He served as Head of Commonwealth Protocol (2018–2019) and in various First Assistant Secretary roles in the Department of Veterans’ Affairs (2019–2021).

On 17 October 2003, Fraser was awarded the Medal of the Order of Australia for his efforts following the Bali bombings of October 2002, in providing assistance to the victims and their families. He was further honoured with appointment as a Lieutenant of the Royal Victorian Order in January 2014, for his services as Deputy Official Secretary to the Governor-General of Australia since 2009.

Fraser was appointed Official Secretary to the Governor-General of Australia on 27 June 2014, succeeding Stephen Brady. He left the post in August 2018, and for his services was advanced to Commander of the Royal Victorian Order in the 2019 New Year Honours.

Fraser was advanced to an Officer of the Order of Australia (AO) as part of the 2019 Australia Day Honours for "distinguished service to the Crown as Official Secretary to the Governor-General, and to international relations."

Fraser is also co-founder and CEO of charity Make A Mark Australia, empowering children in need through improved access to education (since 2009).

Government offices
Preceded by Stephen Brady	Official Secretary to the Governor-General of Australia; 2014–2018	Succeeded by Paul Singer
