= James Dooley (New South Wales politician) =

Australian politician (1877–1950)

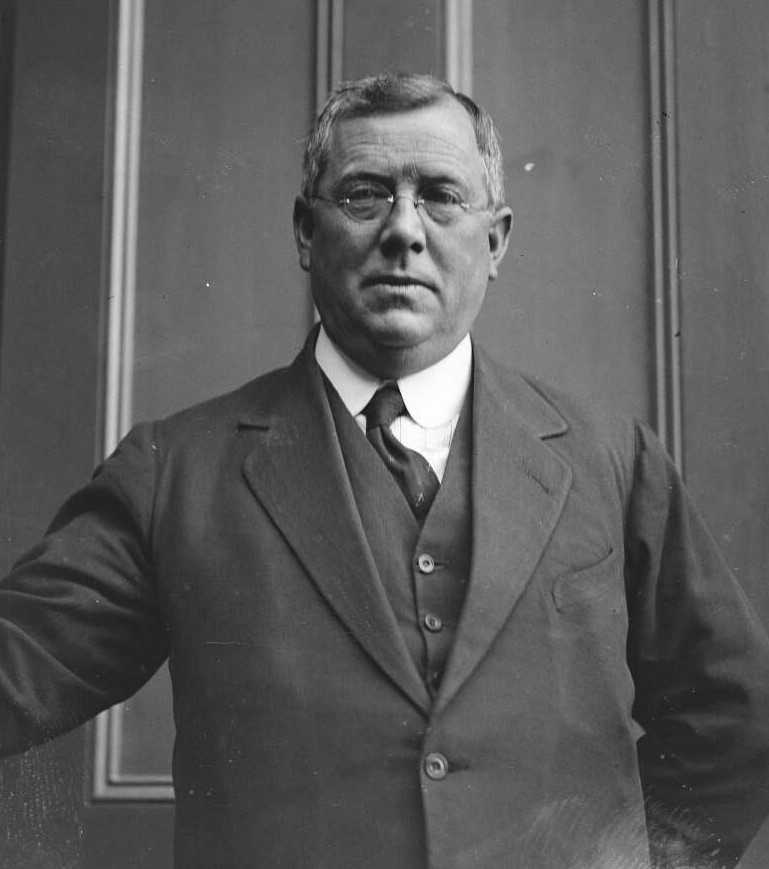

21st Premier of New South Wales
- In office 5 October 1921 – 20 December 1921
- Preceded by: John Storey
- Succeeded by: Sir George Fuller
- In office 20 December 1921 – 13 April 1922
- Preceded by: Sir George Fuller
- Succeeded by: Sir George Fuller
- Constituency: Hartley

Personal details
- Born: James Thomas Dooley; 26 April 1877 Ballymahon, County Longford, Ireland
- Died: 2 January 1950 (aged 72) Sydney, New South Wales, Australia
- Resting place: Eastern Suburbs Memorial Park
- Party: Labor
- Spouse: Kate Rodé Trundle

James Thomas Dooley (26 April 1877 – 2 January 1950) was an Australian political figure who served twice, briefly, as Premier of New South Wales during the early 1920s.

== Early years ==
Born in the townland of Curracreehan (possibly Currycreaghan), near Ballymahon, County Longford, Ireland, he was the fourth son of Thomas Dooley, a farmer, and his wife Elizabeth, née O'Connor.

He arrived in Brisbane, Australia at the age of 8, where he attended a state school before commencing work as a draper's assistant at twelve and was later apprenticed to a tailor. He attended evening classes and joined his college's literary and debating societies, and eventually, the Labor Party. In about 1901, he worked at Cobar and around the outback of New South Wales before settling in Lithgow, New South Wales and marrying Kate Rodé Trundle in 1905.

== Parliamentary career ==
In 1907, he was elected to the seat of Hartley in the New South Wales Legislative Assembly and was its youngest member at the time. From 1920 to 1927 he represented Bathurst. On the expulsion of Premier William Holman and others from the Labor Party on the issue of November 1916 World War I conscription in Australia, Dooley became deputy party leader to Ernest Durack. When Durack resigned in February 1917, John Storey became party leader and Dooley remained deputy leader. The 1920 election was evenly divided with Labor only able to govern due to Nationalist Daniel Levy controversially accepting re-election as speaker. Dooley was appointed Colonial Secretary (including responsibility for state enterprises and the police) and Minister for Housing from April 1920 to October 1921. Dooley acted as Premier during Storey's six-month trip to England (January–July 1921) and when Storey was sick. He became Premier on Storey's death in October 1921. Levy resigned as speaker on 12 December 1921, replaced by Labor's Simon Hickey and the government resigned after it was defeated on the floor of the house 44 votes to 45 and Governor Sir Walter Davidson declined to call an early election. (Note: As the speaker did not vote, with Hickey as speaker Labor was reduced to 43 votes out of 89, plus the support of Arthur Gardiner (Independent Labor).) New Premier George Fuller did not have a majority in parliament, was also refused an early election and resigned within seven hours of his appointment. Dooley regained power with Levy agreeing to remain as speaker. He lost a highly sectarian election campaign to Fuller in April 1922.

As the result of a dispute with a party executive, dominated by the Australian Workers' Union, he was expelled from the party in February 1923, but reinstated by the NSW Labor Party annual conference later that year. In August 1923, he resigned and Jack Lang became leader. During the 1925–1927 Lang Government Dooley served as Speaker. Afterwards he fell out with the Labor leadership, lost Labor preselection for Bathurst, and stood unsuccessfully as an Independent Labor candidate for the Senate in the 1931 federal election and for Hartley in the 1932 state election, which swept Lang from office. He also ran unsuccessfully against Billy Hughes in Division of North Sydney in 1940. His first wife died in 1936, and he married Irene Mary Kenney in 1946. He owned two Lithgow hotels during his later years.

== Death ==
James Dooley died on 2 January 1950 at the Liverpool Hospital in Sydney. He was survived by his wife, son and daughter. His funeral was held at Sydney's St. Mary's Cathedral on 4 January 1950, and he was interred at Botany Cemetery on the same day.

== Notes ==
New South Wales Legislative Assembly
Preceded by John Hurley	Member for Hartley; 1907–1920	District abolished
Preceded by Valentine Johnston	Member for Bathurst; 1920–1927; Served alongside: Fitzpatrick, Johnston/Rosenthal/Kelly	Succeeded by Gus Kelly
Preceded by Daniel Levy	Speaker of the New South Wales Legislative Assembly; 1925–1927	Succeeded by Sir Daniel Levy
Political offices
Preceded by George Fuller	Colonial Secretary of New South Wales; 1920–1921	Succeeded by Charles Oakes
Preceded by Charles Oakes	Minister for Housing; 1920–1921	Succeeded by Thomas Henley
Preceded by John Storey	Premier of New South Wales; 1921	Succeeded by George Fuller
Preceded by Charles Oakes	Colonial Secretary of New South Wales; 1921–1922	Succeeded by Charles Oakes
Preceded by George Fuller	Premier of New South Wales; 1921–1922	Succeeded by George Fuller
Party political offices
Preceded by John Storey	Leader of the New South Wales Labor Party; 1921–1923	Succeeded by Jack Lang
