= Windsor and Richmond Gazette =

Newspaper in New South Wales, Australia

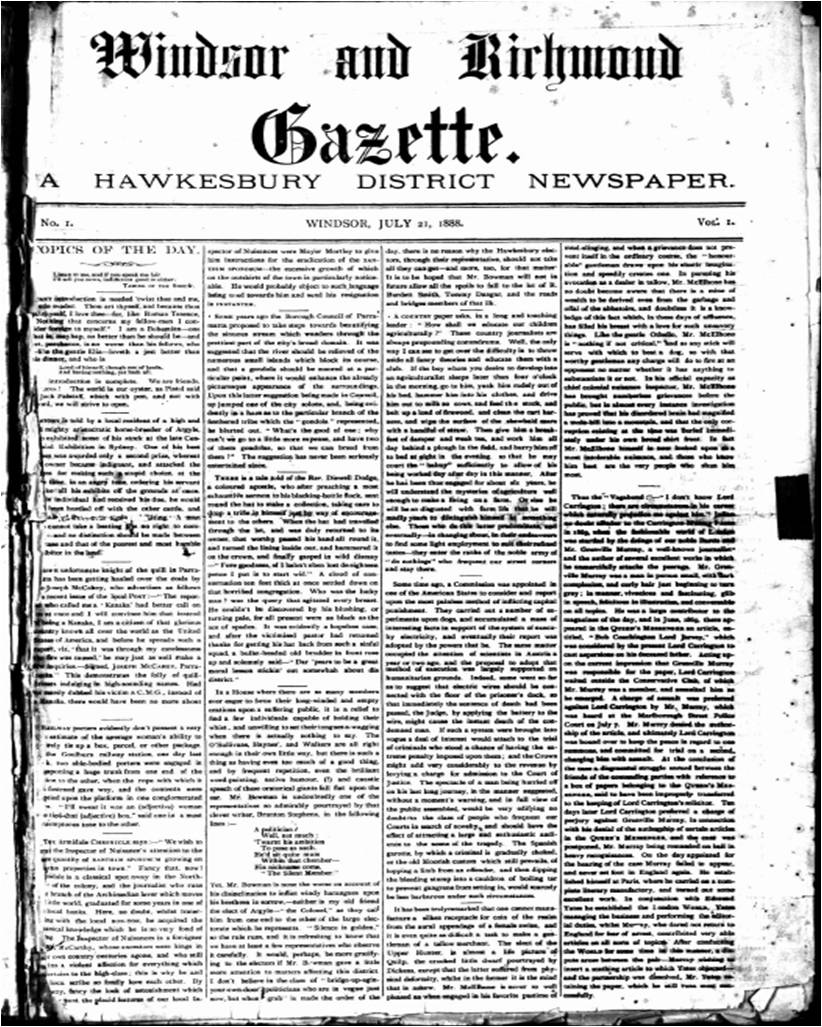
Windsor and Richmond Gazette, 21 July 1888

Windsor and Richmond Gazette, later published as the Hawkesbury Gazette, was a weekly English language compact format newspaper published in Windsor, New South Wales, Australia.

== History ==
First published on 21 July 1888 by John Charles Lucas Fitzpatrick. The Windsor and Richmond Gazette was published from 1888-1983.

On 4 July 1945 the Hawkesbury Herald was incorporated as part of the Windsor and Richmond Gazette. The Herald reported its amalgamation with other district newspapers saying that the newspaper would be "purchased by Hawkesbury Consolidated Press to be incorporated in the Windsor and Richmond Gazette, which paper, with the Hawkesbury Courier, will continue to be published from the office of the firm".

From 18 May 1983, the Windsor and Richmond Gazette changed its name to the Hawkesbury Gazette and continues to be published.

=== Proprietors ===
No. 562, Saturday 1 July 1899, is the last issue attributed to John Charles Lucas Fitzpatrick. From no. 563, Saturday 8 July 1899, John Osborne is attributed as the proprietor with the statement, "Printed and published by John Osborne, sole proprietor, at the Gazette Office, George-Street, Windsor".

== Digitisation ==
The paper has been digitised as part of the Australian Newspapers Digitisation Program of the National Library of Australia.

== See also ==
- List of newspapers in Australia
- List of newspapers in New South Wales
