= Hawkesbury Herald =

Australian weekly newspaper (1902–1945)

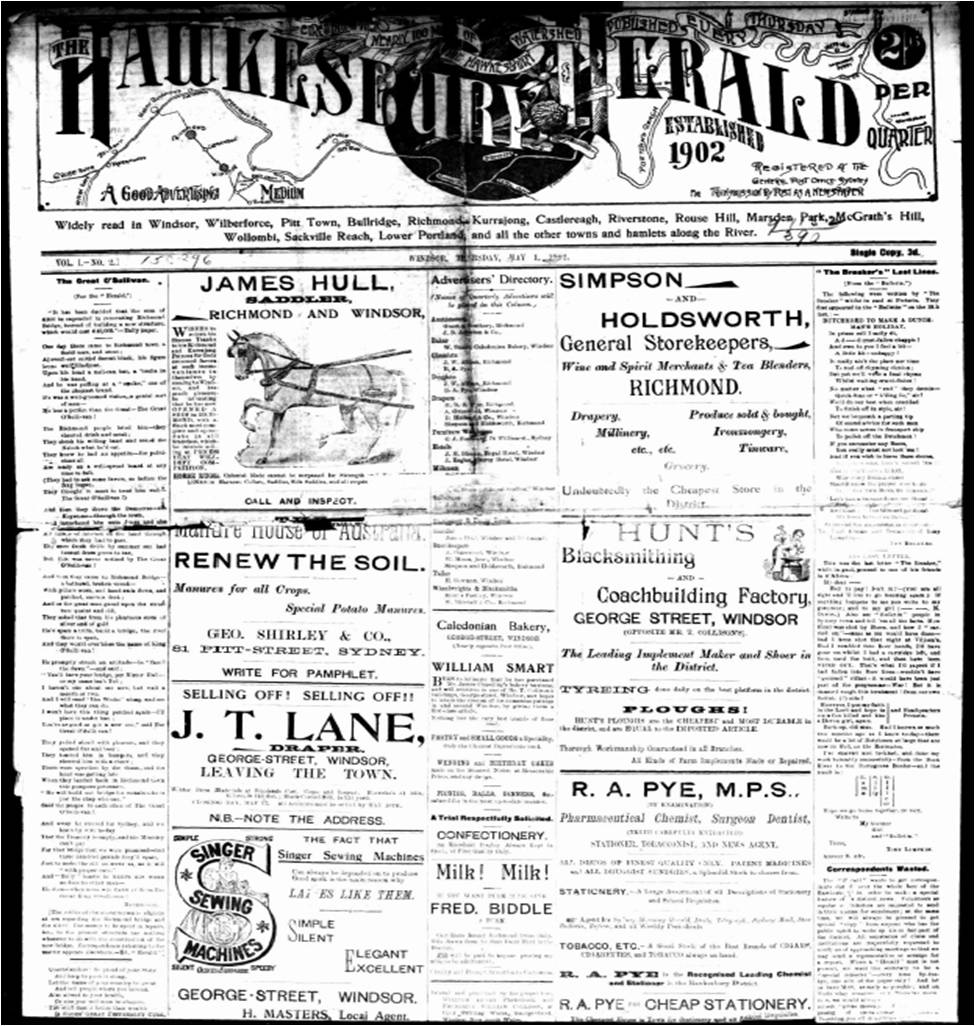
Hawkesbury Herald 1 May 1902

The Hawkesbury Herald was a weekly English language newspaper published in Windsor, New South Wales, Australia for the Hawkesbury River community.

== History ==
The first issue of the Hawkesbury Herald was published on 24 April 1902 by William Henry Pinkstone and Frederick William Collison. Pinkstone and Collison published the newspaper until 1940. The newspaper continued to be published after 1940 until 1945 when it was merged into the Windsor and Richmond Gazette. The Windsor and Richmond Gazette is now published as the Hawkesbury Gazette. The newspaper was circulated in townships along the Hawkesbury River including Windsor, Richmond, Castlereagh and Marsden Park.

== Digitisation ==
The newspaper was digitised as part of the Australian Newspapers Digitisation Program of the National Library of Australia.

== See also ==
- List of newspapers in Australia
