= Paul Singer (public servant) =

Australian public servant and naval officer

Paul Singer CVO
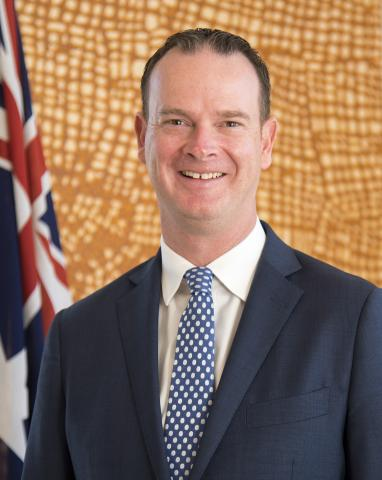
- Official portrait, 2019

12th Official Secretary to the Governor-General of Australia
- In office 18 August 2018 – 1 July 2024
- Monarchs: Elizabeth II; Charles III
- Governors-General: Sir Peter Cosgrove; David Hurley
- Deputy: Jeff Barnes
- Preceded by: Mark Fraser
- Succeeded by: Gerard Martin

Personal details
- Education: Yarra Valley Grammar
- Alma mater: University of Sydney; University of New South Wales; Australian Defence Force Academy
- Awards: Commander of the Royal Victorian Order; Commander of the Order of St John

Military service
- Allegiance: Australia
- Branch/service: Royal Australian Navy (1996–2008); Royal Australian Navy Reserve (2008–present)
- Years of service: 1996–present
- Rank: Lieutenant
- Battles/wars: War in Afghanistan; Iraq War

Paul Anthony Lynden Singer, CVO is an Australian public servant and naval officer, who served as the 12th official secretary to the governor-general of Australia under Sir Peter Cosgrove from August 2018 and David Hurley from July 2019 to July 2024. He is a serving officer in the Royal Australian Navy Reserve, and formerly an active lieutenant in the Royal Australian Navy.

== Naval career ==
Singer enlisted in the Royal Australian Navy in January 1996 as a principal warfare officer. He served on numerous vessels, including as the warfare and boarding officer onboard HMAS Anzac (2001–2003) and as the executive officer of HMAS Launceston (2003–2005). From 2005–2006 he was the course implementation officer at HMAS Cerberus. In May 2008 he transferred to the active reserve as a lieutenant.

== Vice regal career ==
In 2008, Singer took up a position at Government House as the Manager Strategic Program and Operations. He managed the 2011 Royal Visit and Commonwealth Heads of Government Meeting. In 2015, he was appointed as the Director of Operations at Government House and ran the day-to-day management of the house.

In 2016, Singer was appointed as Deputy Official Secretary and, in 2018, as the Official Secretary. As Official Secretary he served as the ex-officio Secretary of the Order of Australia and secretary of the Australian Bravery Decoration Council.

== Honours and awards ==
Singer was appointed a Member of the Royal Victorian Order in the 2016 New Year Honours, and an Officer of the Order of St John on 19 February 2021. During King Charles III's visit to Australia in 2024, Singer was advanced to Commander of the Royal Victorian Order. In late 2024, Singer was promoted to Commander in the Order of St John.

Government offices
Preceded by Mark Fraser	Official Secretary to the Governor-General of Australia; 2018–2024	Succeeded by Gerard Martin
