= William Cortis =

Medical practitioner and politician in New South Wales, Australia

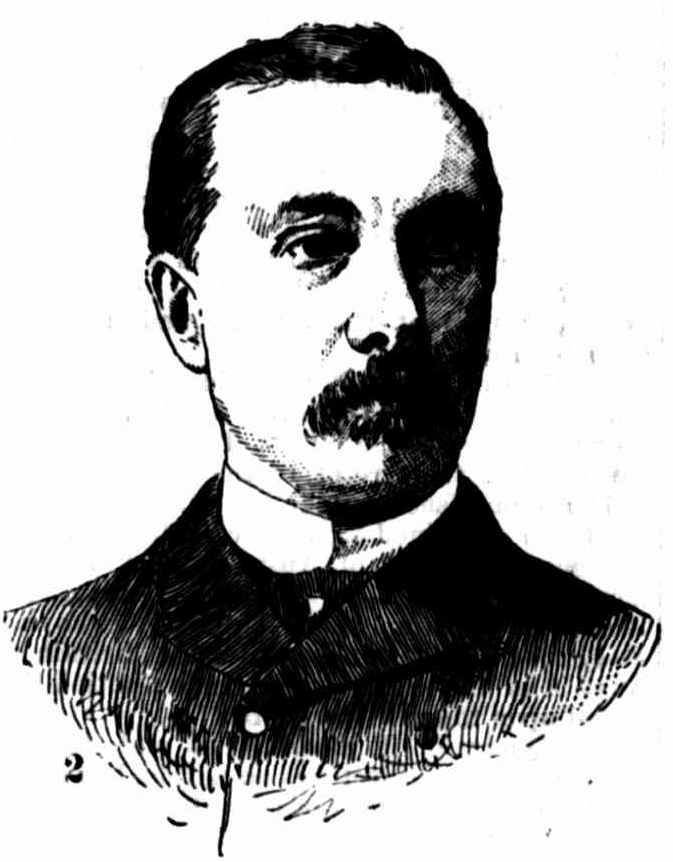

William Richard Cortis (c. 1847 – 5 January 1909) was an English-born medical practitioner and politician in New South Wales, Australia.

He was born in Yorkshire and attended King's College School and Guy's Hospital, where he studied medicine and qualified in 1861. In 1868 he became house surgeon at Guy's Hospital, and he later worked at Bedlam and Colney Hatch asylums. His first attempt to migrate to New South Wales ended in disaster as he was shipwrecked in Brazil. He returned to England and tried again in 1871, living first at Hill End before settling in Bathurst, where he worked at the hospital. He married Florence Fyans, the daughter of Captain Fyans in 1873. He was a Bathurst alderman and served as mayor from February 1886, until February 1887. In February 1887 he was elected to the New South Wales Legislative Assembly as the Free Trade member for Bathurst, defeating the long standing member Francis Suttor. He did not stand for re-election in 1889.

Cortis served as a captain in the second contingent of the New South Wales Army Medical Corps in the Boer War, participating in operations in Orange Free State (including actions at Poplar Grove, Driefontein, Karee Siding, Vet River, Zand River, Bethlehem and Bothaville) and in the Transvaal (including actions at Johannesburg, Pretoria, Diamond Hill and Belfast). He was awarded the South African War Medal with five clasps.

Cortis died in Perth, Western Australia, in 1909 (aged 61–62) .

New South Wales Legislative Assembly
Preceded by Francis Suttor	Member for Bathurst; 1887–1889	Succeeded by William Paul
Civic offices
Preceded by Edmund T Webb	Mayor of Bathurst; 1886	Succeeded by Thomas Machattie
