= William Paul (Australian politician) =

Australian politician

William Henry Paul (11 August 1846 – 21 July 1947) was an Australian politician.

He was born in Richmond to shoemaker Samuel Paul and Betsy Walkham. A saddler by trade, he settled in Bathurst and in 1867 married Elizabeth Bray, with whom he had seven children. His business was successful and he eventually became an auctioneer. In 1889 he was elected to the New South Wales Legislative Assembly as the Free Trade member for Bathurst. He was defeated in 1891. Paul died at Bathurst in 1947.

New South Wales Legislative Assembly
Preceded by William Cortis	Member for Bathurst; 1889–1891	Succeeded by Francis Suttor
