= Valentine Johnston =

Australian politician

Valentine Carlysle Ross Wood Johnston (27 December 1880 – 11 February 1957) was an Australian politician.

He was born in Bathurst to financier John Wood Johnston and Caroline Jane, née Mutton. He attended primary school at O'Connell before working as a miner at Burraga and then Portland, where he was secretary of the miners' union. He moved to Sydney and became a solicitor's clerk. A Boer War veteran, He married Eva Emily Millard in 1911; the couple had two sons. In 1917 he was elected to the New South Wales Legislative Assembly as the Labor member for Bathurst, holding the seat until his defeat in 1922. He died in 1957 at Balgowlah, at which time he was working as a munitions inspector.

New South Wales Legislative Assembly
Preceded by Ernest Durack	Member for Bathurst; 1917–1922; Served alongside: None; James Dooley, John Fitzpatrick	Succeeded by Sir Charles Rosenthal
