= Order of Australia =

Australian national honour

- Insignia of knights and dames of the Order of Australia

Awarded by the Governor-General of Australia (Note: Before 1992 honours were presented to the Queen for her prior approval. Since changes implemented by the Keating government, the monarch is only informed after awards have been presented.)
- Type: National order
- Awarded for: Achievement and merit in service to Australia or humanity
- Founder: Elizabeth II, Queen of Australia on the advice of Gough Whitlam
- Sovereign Head: Charles III, King of Australia
- Chancellor and Principal Companion: Samantha Mostyn, Governor-General
- Grades: Companion (AC); Officer (AO); Member (AM); Medal (OAM)
- Former grades: Knight/Dame (AK/AD) (Note: The level of Dame/Knight was established in 1976, disestablished in 1986, re-established in 2014 and again disestablished in 2015; neither disestablishment affected existing awards.)
- Website: Official website and nomination portal

Statistics
- First induction: 14 April 1975
- Total inductees: Total as of July 2024: AK/AD – 19; AC – 647; AO – 3,615; AM – 13,169; OAM – 30,670; More info below
- Ribbons: general division; military division

The Order of Australia is an Australian honour which recognises Australian citizens and other persons for outstanding service and achievement. It was instituted on 14 February 1975 by Elizabeth II, Queen of Australia, on the advice of then-prime minister Gough Whitlam. Before the establishment of the order, Australians could receive British honours, which continued to be issued in parallel until 1992.

Appointments to the order are made by the governor-general, "with the approval of The Sovereign", in accordance with the recommendations of the Council for the Order of Australia. Members of the government are not involved in the recommendation of appointments, other than for military and honorary awards.

The King of Australia is the sovereign head of the order, and the governor-general is the principal companion and chancellor of the order. The governor-general's official secretary, Gerard Martin (appointed 1 July 2024), is secretary of the order.

== Levels of membership ==
The order is divided into a general and a military division. The five levels of appointment to the order in descending order of seniority are:

The different levels of the order are awarded according to the recipients' levels of achievement:

Award	Criteria (general division)	Criteria (military division)	Quota (per year)	
Knight/Dame (AK/AD) (No longer awarded)	"Extraordinary and pre-eminent achievement and merit of the highest degree in service to Australia or to humanity at large."	Not awarded	4	2014–15
Knight/Dame (AK/AD) (No longer awarded)	"Extraordinary and pre-eminent achievement and merit of the highest degree in service to Australia or to humanity at large."	Not awarded	2	1976–86
Companion (AC)	"Eminent achievement and merit of the highest degree in service to Australia or to humanity at large."	"Eminent service in duties of great responsibility."	35	2016 to present
Companion (AC)	"Eminent achievement and merit of the highest degree in service to Australia or to humanity at large."	"Eminent service in duties of great responsibility."	30	2003–16
Companion (AC)	"Eminent achievement and merit of the highest degree in service to Australia or to humanity at large."	"Eminent service in duties of great responsibility."	25	1975–2003
Officer (AO)	"Distinguished service of a high degree to Australia or to humanity at large."	"Distinguished service in responsible positions."	140	2016 to present
Officer (AO)	"Distinguished service of a high degree to Australia or to humanity at large."	"Distinguished service in responsible positions."	125	2003–16
Officer (AO)	"Distinguished service of a high degree to Australia or to humanity at large."	"Distinguished service in responsible positions."	100	1975–2003
Member (AM)	"Service in a particular locality or field of activity or to a particular group."	"Exceptional service or performance of duty."	605	2019 to present
Member (AM)	"Service in a particular locality or field of activity or to a particular group."	"Exceptional service or performance of duty."	365	2018–19
Member (AM)	"Service in a particular locality or field of activity or to a particular group."	"Exceptional service or performance of duty."	340	2016–18
Member (AM)	"Service in a particular locality or field of activity or to a particular group."	"Exceptional service or performance of duty."	300	2003–16
Member (AM)	"Service in a particular locality or field of activity or to a particular group."	"Exceptional service or performance of duty."	225	1975–2003
Medal (OAM)	"Service worthy of particular recognition."	"Meritorious service or performance of duty."	No quota	

Honorary awards at all levels may be made to non-citizens. These awards are made additional to the quotas.

== Insignia ==
The order's insignia was designed by Stuart Devlin.

The badge of the Order of Australia is a convex disc (gold for AKs, ADs and ACs, gilt for AOs, AMs and OAMs) representing a single flower of mimosa. At the centre is a ring, representing the sea, with the word Australia below two branches of mimosa. The whole disc is topped by the Crown of St Edward. The AC badge is decorated with citrines, blue enamelled ring, and enamelled crown. The AO badge is similar, without the citrines. For the AM badge, only the crown is enamelled, and the OAM badge is plain. The AK/AD badge is similar to that of the AC badge, but with the difference that it contains at the centre an enamelled disc bearing an image of the coat of arms of Australia. The colours of royal blue and gold are taken from the livery colours of the Commonwealth Coat of Arms, the then national colours.

The star for knights and dames is a convex golden disc decorated with citrines, with a blue royally crowned inner disc bearing an image of the coat of arms of Australia.

The ribbon of the order is royal blue with a central stripe of mimosa blossoms. Awards in the military division are edged with 1.5 mm golden bands. AKs, male ACs and AOs wear their badges on a necklet and male AMs and OAMs wear them on a ribbon on the left chest. Women usually wear their badges on a bow on the left shoulder, although they may wear the same insignia as males if so desired.

A gold lapel pin for daily wear is issued with each badge of the order at the time of investiture; AK/AD and AC lapel pins feature a citrine central jewel, AO and AM lapel pins have a blue enamelled centre and OAM lapel pins are plain.

== Nomination and appointment ==
Since 1976 any Australian citizen may nominate any person for an Order of Australia award. People who are not Australian citizens may be awarded honorary membership of the order at all levels. Nomination forms are submitted to the Director, Honours Secretariat, a position within the Office of the Official Secretary to the Governor-General of Australia, at Government House, Canberra, which are then forwarded to the Council for the Order of Australia. The council consists of 19 members: seven selected by the prime minister (described as "community representatives"), eight appointed by the governments of each respective state and territory, and three ex officio members (the chief of the Defence Force, the vice-president of the Federal Executive Council and a public servant responsible for honours policy). The Council chair as of August 2024 is Shelley Reys.

The Council makes recommendations to the governor-general. Awards are announced on Australia Day and on the King's Birthday public holiday in June, on the occasion of a special announcement by the governor-general (usually honorary awards), and on the appointment of a new governor-general. The governor-general presents the order's insignia to new appointees.

Appointments to the order may be made posthumously as long as a person was nominated for an award whilst they were still alive. Awardees may subsequently resign from the order, and the Council may advise the governor-general to remove an individual from the order, who may cancel an award. (Note: Resignation and cancellation have occurred up to the companion level – see Former Companions.)

Announcements of all awards, cancellations and resignations appear in the Commonwealth Gazette. Nomination forms are confidential and not covered by the Freedom of Information Act 1982 (Cth). The reasoning behind a nomination being successful or unsuccessful—and even the attendees of the meetings where such nominations are discussed—remains confidential.

== History ==
=== Background ===
As a member of the British Empire, members of the colonies and later federated nation of Australia were able to have achievement awarded under the British Imperial Honours system. However, existing criticism of the aristocratic nature of the awards grew following a cash-for-honours corruption scandal in the UK in 1922. Moves to abolish the awards federally and the states were unsuccessful; however the Australian Labor Party remained opposed and generally refused to recommend awards whilst in office, with this a part of the party's platform since 1918. This was confirmed in a resolution adopted unanimously by the party conference in 1921. In 1949, a Cabinet subcommittee of the Labor Chifley government recommended the creation of single level honour called the Order of the Southern Cross or the Order of the Golden Wattle to be established at Australia's jubilee of federation in 1951. However, the Labor government lost office in the 1949 elections, replaced by the long running Menzies government who supported the continued use of the imperial system.

=== Establishment ===
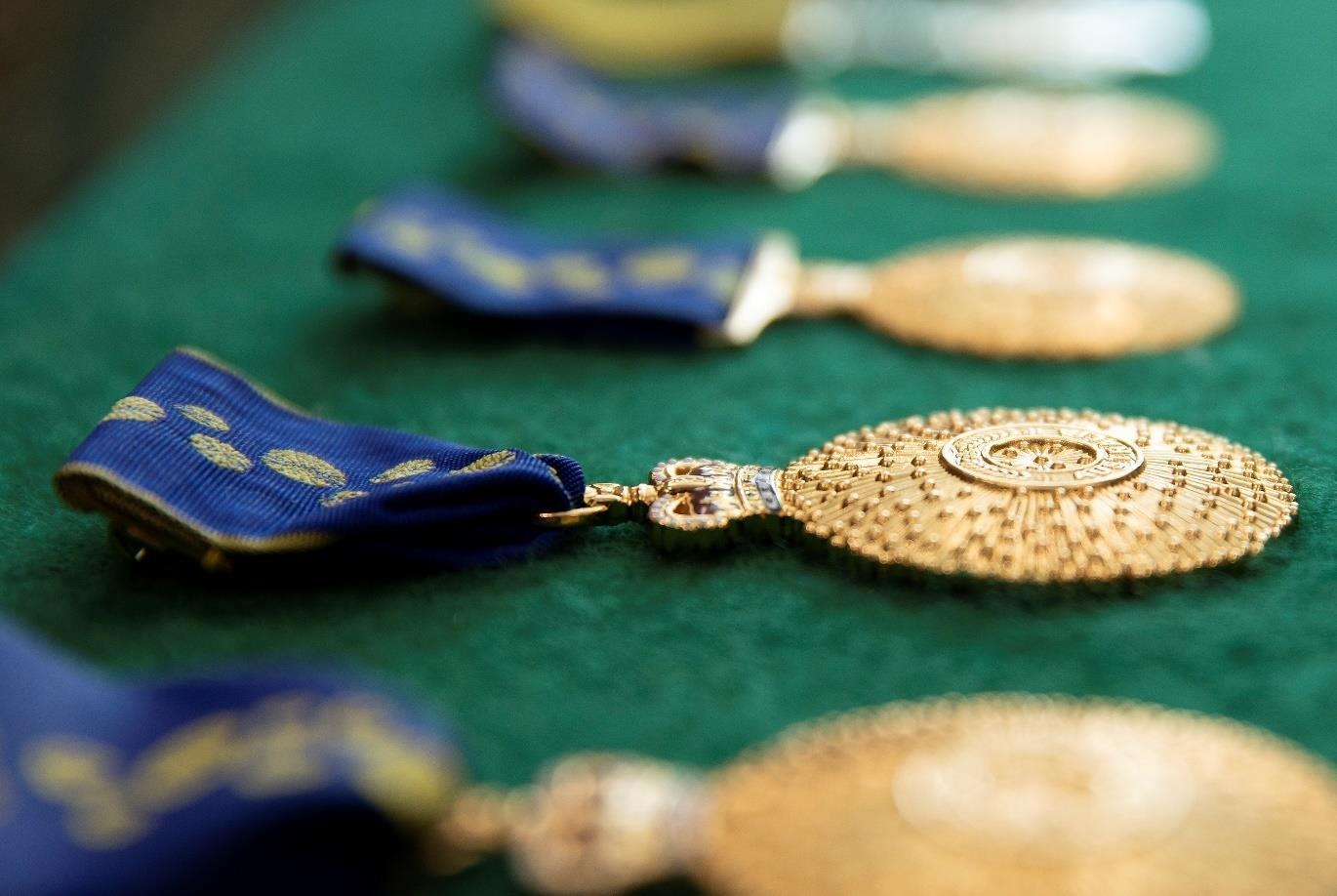
Several insignias for the Member of the Order of Australia (AM) to be granted

The Order of Australia was established on 14 February 1975 by letters patent of Queen Elizabeth II, acting as Queen of Australia, and on the advice of the Labor prime minister, Gough Whitlam. The original order had three levels: Companion (AC), Officer (AO) and Member (AM) as well as two divisions: Civil Division and Military Division. Whitlam had previously announced in 1972 (on his third day in office) that his government would no longer nominate persons for British Imperial honours (with the exception of awards recommended by the soon to be independent government of the Territory of Papua and New Guinea); however this did not affect the constitutional right of state governments to recommend imperial awards.

According to the governor general's then-secretary Sir David Smith, Whitlam was furious when he first saw Devlin's design for the insignia of the order, due to the inclusion of a representation of the states (with whom Whitlam's government was constantly in dispute) through the state badges within the Commonwealth Coat of Arms.

The original three-level structure of the Order of Australia was modelled closely upon the Order of Canada, though the Order of Australia has been awarded rather more liberally, especially in regard to honorary awards to non-citizens. As of July 2024 only 30 non-Canadians have been appointed to the Order of Canada, while 537 non-Australians have been appointed to the Order of Australia, with 46 to the Companion level.

Public reaction to the new awards was mixed. Only the state Labor governments of Tasmania and South Australia agreed to submit recommendations for the new awards, with the remaining governments affirming their committent to the existing imperial honours system. Newspaper editorials similarly praised the awards as an example of Australia's greater independence, whilst also noting that the awards would likely appear second-rate. The Australian stated that

There is no longer a British Empire; everyone knows that. But somehow the phrase "imperial honours" still carries a ring of regal authenticity that somehow transcends nationalism. For the time being a recipient ... of the Order of Australia is likely to feel a bit second-rate, and the public is likely to agree. We hate to be the first to say it, but there is no doubt that the Order of Australia (OA) will be labelled as the Ocker Award.

Satire and mockery also greeted the awards, being dubbed "Gough's Gongs" and "the Order of the Wombat".

=== Fraser and Hawke governments ===
Ten months after the Order of Australia was created, the Whitlam government lost office to the newly elected Liberal Fraser government. The new government decided to once again make recommendations for imperial awards, whilst maintaining and expanding the Order of Australia. This was done by the addition of two additional award levels: Knight or Dame (AK or AD) above the level of Companion, and the Medal of the Order of Australia (OAM) below Members. The Civil Division was also renamed the General Division, so that awards could be given to those in the Defence Force for non-military achievement. These changes were made on 24 May 1976. The reaction to the changes to the awards were similarly split along party lines.

Following the 1983 federal election, Labor Prime Minister Bob Hawke recommitted to the end of recommendations for imperial awards. No knighthoods were awarded during his first term in office and he advised the abolition of the knight/dame level after being re-elected in 1986. During the time the division was active from 1976 to 1983, twelve knights and two dames were created.

=== Re-establishment and abolition of Knights and Dames ===
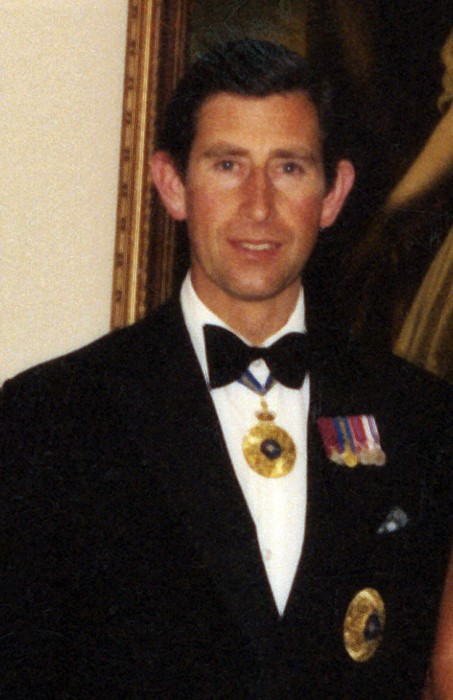
King Charles III (then Prince of Wales) wearing the insignia of a Knight of the Order of Australia, 1983

The neck badge of a Knight of the Order of Australia appeared at the base of the coat of arms of Sir Ninian Stephen.

On 19 March 2014, monarchist prime minister Tony Abbott advised the Queen to reinstate the level of knight or dame and the Queen co-signed letters patent to bring this into effect. The change was publicly announced on 25 March, and gazetted on 17 April 2014. Up to four knights or dames could be appointed each year, by the Monarch of Australia on the advice of the prime minister after consultation with the chairman of the Order of Australia Council.

Five awards of knight and dame were then made, to the outgoing governor-general, Quentin Bryce; her successor, Peter Cosgrove; a recent chief of the Defence Force, Angus Houston; a recent governor of New South Wales, Marie Bashir; and Prince Philip. This last award was widely met with ridicule and dismay by many in the Australian media. The award was also heavily criticised in the community, with 72% disapproving and 12% in favour of the award to Prince Philip in a ReachTEL poll.

The Australian Labor Party continued to oppose knighthoods and damehoods. Leader of the opposition Bill Shorten stated in March 2014 that the party would again discontinue the level if it were to win the next Australian federal election.

The knighthood decision was a significant factor that caused Liberal party members to question Abbott's leadership, with Malcolm Turnbull succeeding in a challenge to take the prime ministership in September 2015. Two months after coming into office, the new republican prime minister announced that the Queen had approved his request to amend the Order's letters patent and cease awards at the Knight/Dame level. Existing titles would not be affected. The move was attacked by monarchists and praised by republicans. The amendments to the constitution of the Order were gazetted on 22 December 2015.

=== 2016–present ===
Yvonne Kenny AM represented the Order at the 2023 coronation.

== Current membership ==
=== Officials of the order ===
- Sovereign Head of the Order: King of Australia (Charles III)
- Chancellor and Principal Companion: Governor-General of Australia (Sam Mostyn)
- Secretary: Official Secretary to the Governor-General of Australia (Gerard Martin)

King Charles III, when he was Prince of Wales, was appointed a Knight of the Order of Australia (AK) on 14 March 1981. As he is not an Australian citizen, even though he was the heir to the Australian throne at the time, this would have required the award to be honorary. To overcome this issue, his appointment was created by an amendment to the constitution of the Order of Australia by special letters patent signed by the Queen, on the recommendation of Prime Minister Malcolm Fraser.

In March 2014 the knight and dame levels, which had been abolished in 1986 by Prime Minister Bob Hawke, were reintroduced to the Order of Australia by Tony Abbott. At the same time, Abbott announced that future appointments at this level would be recommended by the prime minister alone, rather than by the Council of the Order of Australia, as is the case with all lower levels of the order. In accordance with the statutes of 2014, Prince Philip, Duke of Edinburgh, was created a Knight of the Order by letters patent signed by the Queen on 7 January 2015, on Abbott's advice. Prince Philip's knighthood was announced as part of the Australia Day Honours on 26 January 2015 and his appointment attracted criticism of what Abbott described as his "captain's call". Abbott responded by announcing that future recommendations for appointments as Knights and Dames of the Order would be determined by the Council of the Order of Australia.

=== Honorary awards ===
Awards of the Order of Australia are sometimes made to people who are not citizens of Australia to honour extraordinary achievements. These achievements, or the people themselves, are not necessarily associated with Australia, although they often are. On 1 July 2024, the Australian Honours website listed appointments for 46 Honorary Companions, 118 Honorary Officers, 174 Honorary Members of the Order of Australia and the award of 199 Honorary Medals of the Order of Australia. Notable honorary awards include:

- Honorary Companion
  - All Honorary Companions of the Order of Australia are notable – see List of Honorary Companions of the Order of Australia
    - See also: Category:Honorary companions of the Order of Australia
- Honorary Officer
  - Ali Alatas, U.S. Congressman Joe Courtney, Mel Gibson, Maina Gielgud, Hiroyuki Iwaki, Clive Lloyd, Lord Morris of Manchester, U.S. General David Petraeus, Admiral Harry Harris, Jerzy Toeplitz, Julius Tahija, Edo de Waart, Malcolm Williamson, Googie Withers and James Wolfensohn
    - Fred Hollows, then a New Zealand citizen, was offered an honorary Officership in 1985, but declined the award; he became an Australian citizen in 1989, and in 1991 was appointed a substantive Companion of the Order
    - Romaldo Giurgola was appointed an honorary Officer in 1989; this became a substantive award in 2000 when he adopted Australian citizenship
    - See also: Category:Honorary officers of the Order of Australia
- Honorary Member
  - Harriet Mayor Fulbright, Lord Harewood, Brian Lara, Sachin Tendulkar and Robyn Williams.
    - Terri Irwin was appointed an Honorary Member in 2006; this became a substantive award when she became an Australian citizen in 2009
    - See also Category:Honorary members of the Order of Australia

=== Gender breakdown ===
Chart of the percentage of Order of Australia honours awarded to women in each year since 1975

Since 1975, just over 30 per cent of recipients of an Order of Australia honour have been women. The number of nominations and awards for women is trending up, with the 2023 Australia Day Honours resulting in the highest percentage of awards for women to date (47.1 per cent, 47.9 per cent in the general division). Advocacy groups such as Honour a Woman and the Workplace Gender Equality Agency have called for greater effort to be made to reach equal representation of men and women in the order.

=== Sociology of recipients of highest levels ===
In December 2010, The Age reported a study of the educational backgrounds of all people who had received Knight/Dame and Companion level awards at that time. It reported: "An analysis of the 435 people who have received the nation's top Order of Australia honours since they were first awarded in 1975, shows they disproportionately attended a handful of elite Victorian secondary schools. Scotch College alumni received the highest number of awards, with 19 former students receiving Australia's [then] highest honour". (Note: The hard-copy article also published a table of the schools which were ranked in the top ten places: Rank / School / Number of ex-students / Private / Public / Vic / NSW / Qld / Tas / SA / WA; 1 / Scotch College, Melbourne / 19 / 19 / / 19; 2 / Geelong Grammar School / 17 / 17 / / 17; 3 / Sydney Boys High School / 13 / / 13 / / 13; =4 / Fort Street High School / 10 / / 10 / / 10; =4 / Perth Modern School / 10 / / 10 / / / / / / 10; =4 / St Peter's College, Adelaide / 10 / 10 / / / / / / 10; =7 / Melbourne Grammar School / 9 / 9 / / 9; =7 / North Sydney Boys High School / 9 / / 9 / / 9; =7 / The King's School, Parramatta / 9 / / 9 / / 9; =10 / Launceston Grammar School / 6 / 6 / / / / / 6; =10 / Melbourne High School / 6 / / 6 / 6; =10 / Wesley College, Melbourne / 6 / 6 / / 6; =10 / Xavier College / 6 / 6 / / 6; Total / / 130 / 73 / 57 / 63 / 41 / / 6 / 10 / 10; / / 100% / 56% / 44% / 48% / 32% / / 5% / 8% / 8%)

=== Lists of recipients in categories ===
Dames of the Order of Australia	Australian dames
Knights of the Order of Australia	Australian knights
Companions of the Order of Australia	Honorary Companions	Former Companions
Officers of the Order of Australia	Honorary Officers	Former Officers
Members of the Order of Australia	Honorary Members	Former Members
Recipients of the Medal of the Order of Australia	Honorary Recipients of the Medal	Former Medal Recipients

=== Order of Australia Association ===
On 26 January 1980 the Order of Australia Association was created as an incorporated body with membership open to award recipients. It is a registered charity, whose stated purpose is "[t]o celebrate and promote outstanding Australian citizenship". (Note: Before 2017, the Association's objects were to "(i) promote loyalty to the Sovereign as Head of State of Australia (ii) foster love of and pride in Australian citizenship and to promote good citizenship ... (iii) encourage the development and maintenance of a constructive and positive sense of national unity amongst Australians [and] (iv) education of the Australian community by promoting awareness in the Australian community of Australia's history, its national institutions, traditions and culture.") It also supports the "community and social activities" of members and promotes and encourages the nomination of other Australians to the Order. The Order also runs a foundation that provides scholarships to tertiary students that show potential as future leaders and are involved in community activities. Branches of the association are in all the states and territories of Australia as well as the UK and the USA.

== Total inductees ==
Total inductees as of July 2024.

	All levels	Knight/Dame (AK/AD)	Companion (AC)	Officer (AO)	Member (AM)	Medal (OAM)
Civil/General division	44,484	19	580	3,198	11,635	29,052
Military division	3,101	Not created	26	296	1,360	1,419
Honorary general division	311 (Note: Not including medals of the Order of Australia.)	0	45	95	171	
Honorary military division	27	Not created	1	26	3	
Total honorary awards	537	0	47	121	174	199
Total substantive awards	47,332	19	606	3,494	12,995	30,471
Total awards	47,869	19	647	3,615	13,169	30,670

== Precedence ==
The order of wearing Australian and other approved honours is determined by the government.

Preceding	Level	Following
Member of the Order of Merit (OM)	Knight/Dame	Knight/Dame Grand Cross of the Order of St Michael and St George (GCMG)
Knight/Dame Grand Cross of the Order of the British Empire (GBE)	Companion	Companion of Honour (CH)
Knight Bachelor	Officer	Companion of the Order of the Bath (CB)
Distinguished Service Cross (DSC)	Member	Lieutenant of the Royal Victorian Order (LVO)
Australian Intelligence Medal (AIM)	Medal	Order of St John

== References in popular culture ==
The award is parodied in the play Amigos, where the central character is determined to be awarded the AC, and uses persuasion, bribery and blackmail in his (ultimately successful) attempts to get himself nominated for the award.

During the 1996 season of the popular television programme Home and Away, the character Pippa Ross was awarded a Medal of the Order of Australia for her years of service as a foster carer.

== See also ==
- Commonwealth realms orders and decorations
- Order of New Zealand
- Order of the British Empire
- Légion d'honneur
