= John Miller (New South Wales politician) =

Australian politician

John Miller (26 October 1870 – 5 August 1934) was an Australian politician.

Born at Mount Rankin near Bathurst to grazier Alexander Miller and Florence Piper, he attended school in Bathurst before working for two years on a station. He subsequently trained as a solicitor and was licensed in 1892. Around 1895 he married Eleanor Frankland, with whom he had a daughter; later, around 1918, he married Sybella Stephen. After his licensing he became a surveyor in Bathurst, and was President of the Advance Bathurst League. In 1907 he was elected to the New South Wales Legislative Assembly for Bathurst, representing the Liberal Party. In 1913 he signed the pledge of one of the predecessors of the Country Party, but he was defeated in that year's elections. Miller died in 1934 in Manly.

New South Wales Legislative Assembly
Preceded by William Young	Member for Bathurst; 1907–1913	Succeeded by Ernest Durack
