= David Berry (politician) =

Australian politician

David John Berry (born 7 June 1951) is a former Australian politician. He was the Liberal member for Bathurst in the New South Wales Legislative Assembly from 1988 to 1991.

Berry managed hotels in Sydney, Lismore, Orange and Bathurst before entering politics. A member of the Liberal Party of Australia, he held several positions including President of the Bathurst branch and member of the Calare Federal Executive Committee. In 1988, he was elected as the Liberal member for the state seat of Bathurst, defeating the sitting Labor member, Mick Clough. He was defeated by Clough in 1991. He contested the seat again in 1999, but came third after the Labor and the National Party.

New South Wales Legislative Assembly
Preceded by Mick Clough	Member for Bathurst; 1988–1991	Succeeded by Mick Clough
