= John Fitzpatrick (New South Wales politician) =

Australian politician and journalist

- Born: John Charles Lucas Fitzpatrick; 15 February 1862; Moama New South Wales
- Died: 7 August 1932 (aged 70); Roseville, New South Wales
- Occupation: Politician
- Years active: 1895-1930
- Political party: Free Trade (1895–1901); Liberal Reform (1901–1917); Nationalist (1917–1930)
- Spouse: Agnes Clare Kelly (married 1886-)

John Charles Lucas Fitzpatrick (15 February 1862 – 7 August 1932) was an Australian politician and journalist.

== Early life ==
Fitzpatrick was born in Moama in the Riverina region of New South Wales, but his family moved to Windsor in 1869. He was educated at a catholic school and he was apprenticed to the former Australian newspaper's Windsor office at 14. He was a compositor on the former Melbourne Punch at 18 and subsequently worked on papers in Gunnedah, Narrabri, Walgett and Parramatta and Goulburn. In January 1886 he married Agnes Clare Kelly. In about 1888, he established the Windsor and Richmond Gazette and in 1905 he bought the Molong Argus, which he sold in 1907.

== Political career ==
Fitzpatrick was elected as the member for Rylstone in the New South Wales Legislative Assembly at the election in July 1895, representing the Free Trade Party. While the election was found to be invalid, he won the subsequent by-election in October 1895. He held the seat until 1904, when he stood unsuccessfully for Northumberland at the election in August 1904. He was the Anti-Socialist Party candidate for the Federal seat of Calare at the 1906 election, but was unsuccessful. In 1907, he won the state seat of Orange as a Liberal and held it until 1930, except for the period of proportional representation between 1920 and 1927, when he was one of the members for Bathurst.

He joined Holman's Nationalist government as Secretary for Mines from November 1916 and Colonial Treasurer from October 1918 until its defeat by John Storey Labor Party in April 1920. He was Secretary for Mines and Minister for Local Government on 20 December 1921 in George Fuller's seven-hour government and again between 1922 and 1925.

Fitzpatrick retired from politics in 1930.

Fitzpatrick died in the Sydney suburb of Roseville, New South Wales on 7 August 1932 (aged 70), survived by a son and daughter.

== Notes ==
Parliament of New South Wales
Political offices
Preceded by Henry Hoyle	Secretary for Mines; 1916 – 1920	Succeeded by George Cann
Preceded by William Holman	Colonial Treasurer; 1918 – 1920	Succeeded by Jack Lang
Preceded by George Cann	Secretary for Mines; Minister for Local Government; 20 Dec 1921	Succeeded by George Cann
Preceded by George Cann	Secretary for Mines; 1922 – 1925	Succeeded by Jack Baddeley
Preceded by George Cann	Minister for Local Government; 1922 – 1925	Succeeded by George Cann
New South Wales Legislative Assembly
Preceded by William Wall	Member for Rylstone; 1895 – 1904	District abolished
Preceded by Albert Gardiner	Member for Orange; 1907 – 1920	District absorbed into Bathurst
Preceded by Valentine Johnston	Member for Bathurst; 1920 – 1927; With: James Dooley; Valentine Johnston / Charles Rosenthal / Gus Kelly	Succeeded by Gus Kelly
New district	Member for Orange; 1927 – 1930	Succeeded by William Folster
