= Mick Clough =

Australian politician

Mick Clough MP

Member of the New South Wales Legislative Assembly for Bathurst
- In office 19 September 1981 – 22 February 1988
- Preceded by: Clive Osborne
- Succeeded by: David Berry
- In office 25 May 1991 – 5 March 1999
- Preceded by: David Berry
- Succeeded by: Gerard Martin

Member of the New South Wales Legislative Assembly for Blue Mountains
- In office 1 May 1976 – 28 August 1981
- Preceded by: Harold Coates
- Succeeded by: Bob Debus

Personal details
- Born: Ralph James Clough; 22 October 1927 Warialda, New South Wales
- Died: 12 August 2008 (aged 80) Perth, Western Australia
- Party: Labor
- Spouse: Doreen Clough (née Frost)
- Children: 1 daughter, 2 sons
- Occupation: Postal officer, motel proprietor

Ralph James "Mick" Clough (22 October 1927 – 12 August 2008) was an Australian politician. He was a Labor Party Member of the New South Wales Legislative Assembly from 1976 to 1981, representing the electorate of Blue Mountains and representing the electorate of Bathurst from 1981 to 1988 and again from 1991 to 1999.

== Private life ==
Clough was born to Michael "Gordon" Clough and Irene Clough (née Smith) in Warialda, New South Wales on 22 October 1927. Although christened Ralph James he was known as "little Mick" after his father.

Clough attended schools in Warialda, Granville, Hornsby and then St Patrick's College, Strathfield.

== Early years ==
After leaving school he followed his father's occupation and worked for the Postmaster-General's Department then Australia Post as a telegraphist and postmaster for a total of 34 years in New South Wales, South Australia and Western Australia before entering politics. As a telegram boy during World War II, he was often an unwelcome sight, bringing bad news of loved ones. He served as a member of the Citizens Military Force from 1948 to 1964.

In 1951, Clough, aged 24, married Doreen Frost and they had three children: Elizabeth, Peter and David. Peter Clough went on to play interstate cricket for Tasmania and Western Australia, and was inducted into the Tasmanian Cricket Hall of Fame.

Having joined the Australian Labor Party in 1948, Clough stood unsuccessfully in the 1973 State election for the New South Wales Legislative Assembly in the electoral district of Blue Mountains. He entered public office as an alderman on the Blue Mountains City Council from 1974 to 1979.

== New South Wales state political career ==
In 1976 Clough again contested the seat of Blue Mountains, this time winning the election and reversing the victory of the independent sitting member Harold Coates three years earlier. Clough was subsequently re-elected in the 1978 State election.

In the 1981 State election, following an electoral boundary adjustment, Clough stood for election in the electoral district of Bathurst which he won defeating Country Party of Australia sitting member, Clive Osborne with a margin of 0.05%. He was subsequently re-elected to that seat in the 1984 State election.

At the 1988 State election, Clough lost the seat to Liberal candidate David Berry. He contested the 1991 State election, regaining the seat from Berry. Clough retained the seat at the 1995 State election. He decided not to contest the 1999 State election and retired from public life. Former Lithgow Mayor, Gerard Martin, successfully retained the seat for Labor.

Clough did not achieve a higher office during his lengthy parliamentary career. (He did, however, serve as Acting Chairman of Committees for a short time in 1997).

Friends and colleagues recalled Clough as a tough fighter for his electorate. During his terms in office his achievements included Bathurst's Macquarie Homes retirement village. He was a strong opponent of privatisation of power stations, financial deregulation and cuts to local services. He also opposed decriminalisation of homosexuality in 1984.

== After politics ==
Following his retirement from politics in 1999, Clough and his wife Doreen operated the Coolawin Gardens Motel in Nambucca Heads.

In 2002 Clough retired to Perth, Western Australia where he died on 12 August 2008 following a long battle with bowel cancer.

New South Wales Legislative Assembly
Preceded by Harold Coates	Member for Blue Mountains; 1976–1981	Succeeded by Bob Debus
Preceded by Clive Osborne	Member for Bathurst; 1981–1988	Succeeded by David Berry
Preceded by David Berry	Member for Bathurst; 1991–1999	Succeeded by Gerard Martin
