= Gordon Wilkins =

Australian politician

Gordon Wilkins (23 August 1885 – 6 April 1938) was an Australian politician.

Born in Mudgee to farmer Abel Wilkins and his wife, he attended Wellington Public School and joined the postal service. He subsequently joined his father as a stock and station agent and auctioneer before becoming a farmer and grazier. After serving as a lieutenant in the France with the Australian Imperial Force from 1915 to 1918, where he lost a leg, he was the first president of the Wellington Returned Servicemen's League. On 25 September 1925 he married Margery Thomas, with whom he had a son. In 1932 he won the seat of Bathurst in the New South Wales Legislative Assembly with joint endorsement from the United Australia Party and the Country Party; he sat with the Country Party in parliament, but condemned it for failing to tackle rural indebtedness. Wilkins lost his seat in 1935 and died at Wellington in 1938.

New South Wales Legislative Assembly
Preceded by Gus Kelly	Member for Bathurst; 1932–1935	Succeeded by Gus Kelly
