= Charles Rosenthal =

Australian politician

Major General Sir Charles Rosenthal KCB, CMG, DSO, VD
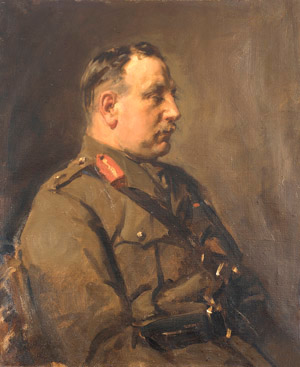
- 1919 portrait by John Longstaff

Administrator of Norfolk Island
- In office 4 December 1937 – 31 December 1945
- Preceded by: Charles Pinney
- Succeeded by: Alexander Wilson

Member of the New South Wales Legislative Council
- In office 3 June 1936 – 28 October 1937

Member of the New South Wales Legislative Assembly for Bathurst
- In office 25 March 1922 – 29 May 1925 Serving with James Dooley; John Fitzpatrick
- Preceded by: Valentine Johnston
- Succeeded by: Gus Kelly

Personal details
- Born: 12 February 1875 Berrima, New South Wales
- Died: 11 May 1954 (aged 79) Green Point, New South Wales
- Party: Nationalist Party
- Spouses: Harriet Ellen Burston (m. 1897; died 1952) Sarah Agnes Rosborough (née McKinstry) (m. 1953)
- Occupation: Architect, soldier, musician and politician
- Nickname: "Rosie"

Military service
- Allegiance: Australia
- Branch/service: Australian Army
- Years of service: 1892–1895; 1903–1937
- Rank: Major General
- Commands: AIF Depots in the United Kingdom (1919); 2nd Division (1918–19, 1921–26, 1932–37); 9th Infantry Brigade (1917–18); 4th Divisional Artillery (1916–17); 3rd Field Artillery Brigade (1914–15); 5th Field Artillery Brigade (1914)
- Battles/wars: First World War; Gallipoli Campaign; Landing at Anzac Cove; Western Front; Battle of the Somme; Battle of Pozières; Battle of Mouquet Farm; Battle of Passchendaele; Battle of Hamel; Battle of Mont St. Quentin
- Awards: Knight Commander of the Order of the Bath; Companion of the Order of St Michael and St George; Distinguished Service Order; Colonial Auxiliary Forces Officers' Decoration; Mentioned in Despatches (7); Officer of the Legion of Honour (France); Croix de Guerre (France); Croix de Guerre (Belgium)

Major General Sir Charles Rosenthal KCB, CMG, DSO, VD (12 February 1875 – 11 May 1954) was an Australian architect, soldier, musician and politician. He commanded units of infantry in the Australian Imperial Force during the First World War, and in the 1920s was elected as a member of the New South Wales Legislative Assembly.

== Early life and career ==
Rosenthal was born in Berrima, New South Wales to a Danish-born school master and Swedish-born mother. He trained as an architect and was elected associate of the Royal Victorian Institute of Architects in 1895. He became a draughtsman in the architectural division of the Department of Railways and Public Works in Perth. After becoming bankrupt and ill he returned to the eastern states in 1899. In 1906 he was made architect for the Anglican Diocese of Grafton and Armidale. He designed St Andrew's, Lismore, New South Wales, St Laurence's, Barraba, and Holy Trinity, Dulwich Hill, Sydney.

== First World War ==
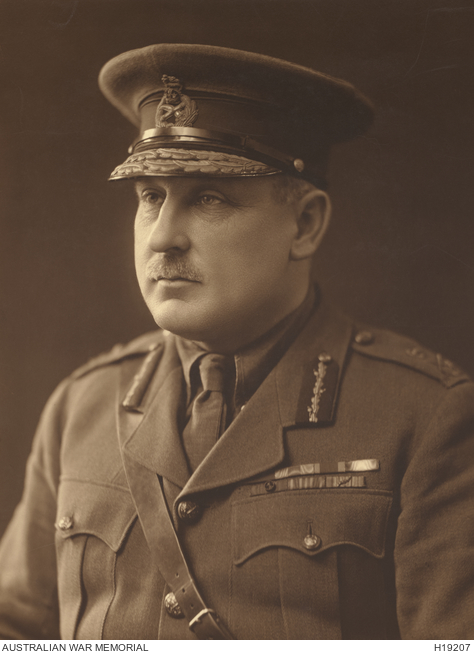
Portrait of Major General Sir Charles Rosenthal KCB CMG DSO VD.

In 1892 Rosenthal joined the Geelong Battery of the Victorian Militia Garrison Artillery as a gunner, but left the service three years later on moving to Melbourne. In 1903 he was commissioned second lieutenant in the Militia Garrison Artillery. He transferred to the Australian Field Artillery in 1908 where he was promoted as major. In 1914 he became commanding officer of the 5th Field Artillery Brigade. Thus before the war he was established as a soldier as well as a professional architect.

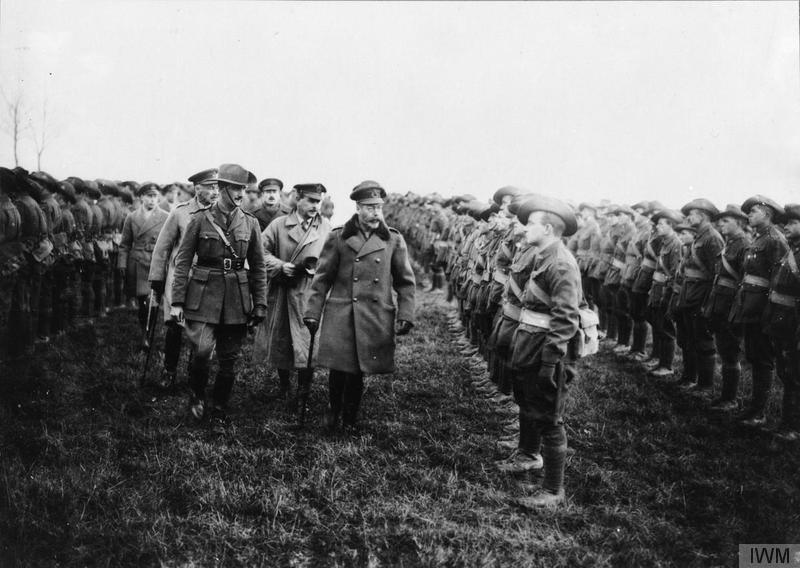
British King George V with Major General Charles Rosenthal, inspecting elements of the 2nd Australian Division, 1 December 1918.

Rosenthal joined the Australian Imperial Force (AIF) in August 1914 and sailed with the first convoy as lieutenant-colonel commanding the Australian 3rd Field Artillery Brigade. Rosenthal was at the Gallipoli landing on 25 April 1915. He was twice wounded at Gallipoli, the second wound causing him to be evacuated to England in August 1915.

He returned to Egypt when the AIF was expanding and given command of the artillery of the new 4th Division and was promoted brigadier general in February 1916. He was engaged in the heavy fighting on the Somme, at Pozières and Mouquet Farm and at Ypres in Belgium. He was wounded a third time in December 1916.

On 25 August 1917 he was appointed general officer commanding (GOC) of the 9th Infantry Brigade, taking over from Alexander Jobson.

On 20 May 1918 Rosenthal was appointed to command the 2nd Division and promoted major general. He took part in the attack at Hamel. He was wounded for a fourth time in 1918 by a sniper when on daylight reconnaissance. He returned to duty in August and was involved in the Battle of Mont St. Quentin.

Rosenthal went to England in March 1919 to command all the depots of the AIF during the repatriation of the troops. He returned to Australia in January 1920.

== Post-war career ==
After the war Rosenthal contemplated not returning to the profession of architecture but did so while leading an active public life. From 1921–26 and also 1932–37 he was commander of the 2nd Division. He served as an alderman of Sydney Municipal Council in 1921–24 and was chairman of its works committee. He was also a Nationalist Party of Australia member for Bathurst in the New South Wales Legislative Assembly in 1922–25 and a member of the New South Wales Legislative Council in 1936–37. He was twice president of the Institute of Architects of New South Wales in 1926–30 and was also president of the federal council of the Australian Institutes of Architects in 1925–28. He also served as president of the Australian Museum, Sydney.

In 1930, during the Great Depression in Australia, he was again declared bankrupt.

In 1937 Rosenthal accepted the post of administrator of Norfolk Island, which he governed throughout the Second World War until 1945. Among other activities he raised a volunteer infantry unit.

== In popular culture ==
Rosenthal may have been a part-model for the authoritarian veterans' leader Benjamin Cooley in D. H. Lawrence's novel, Kangaroo (London, 1923). Rosenthal had been founding secretary in 1921 and later president of The King and Empire Alliance, with which Robert Darroch asserts D.H. Lawrence had been in contact, probably through W. J. R. Scott. It has also been alleged that Rosenthal was involved with the Old Guard, a secret anti-communist militia, set up by the Bruce government.

== Footnotes ==
New South Wales Legislative Assembly
Preceded by Valentine Johnston	Member for Bathurst; 1922–1925; Served alongside: Dooley, Fitzpatrick	Succeeded by Gus Kelly
Professional and academic associations
Preceded by George Herbert Godsell	President of the Institute of Architects of New South Wales; 1922–1926	Succeeded by Alfred Samuel Hook
