= Gus Kelly (politician) =

Australian politician (1890–1967)

The Honourable Gus Kelly

Minister for Health
- In office 16 May 1941 – 30 June 1950
- Premier: William McKell; James McGirr
- Preceded by: Herbert FitzSimons
- Succeeded by: Maurice O'Sullivan

41st Chief Secretary of New South Wales
- In office 3 April 1952 – 13 May 1965
- Premier: Joseph Cahill; Bob Heffron; Jack Renshaw
- Preceded by: Clive Evatt
- Succeeded by: Eric Willis

Personal details
- Born: Christopher Augustus Kelly; 21 August 1890 Obley (near Dubbo), Colony of New South Wales
- Died: 25 March 1967 (aged 76) Mosman, New South Wales, Australia
- Party: NSW Labor; Lang Labor (1931-1936)
- Spouse: Eileen Mary Mitchell
- Occupation: Cement tester

Military service
- Allegiance: Australia
- Branch/service: Australian Army
- Years of service: 1910–1914; 1915–1919
- Rank: Private
- Unit: First Australian Imperial Force
- Battles/wars: First World War

Christopher Augustus "Gus" Kelly (21 August 1890 – 25 March 1967) was an Australian politician. He was a Labor Party member of the New South Wales Legislative Assembly from 1925 to 1932 and again from 1935 until his death in 1967, representing the electorate of Bathurst. He held numerous ministerial positions between 1941 and 1965 in McKell Labor Government.

== Early life ==
Kelly was born near Dubbo, New South Wales and was the son of John Kelly, labourer, and Margaret Kearney. His father died when Kelly was aged and his family moved to Wellington, where he was educated to elementary level at the Wellington convent by Catholic nuns.

He initially worked as a labourer with the New South Wales Government Railways and then later at the Portland, New South Wales limestone quarry. Following an accident, he became a cement tester. In 1906, Kelly joined the Australian Labor Party and held office as Portland branch secretary for 18 years and the local union organiser for the Clerk's Division of the Australian Workers' Union. Kelly had active military service in the First Australian Imperial Force in Egypt and France between 1915 and 1919.

== Political career ==
In a pre-selection held in 1919, Kelly defeated Ben Chifley and was endorsed as one of three Labor candidates to contest the multi-member electorate of Bathurst at the 1922 State election. Kelly was unsuccessful at this election, and successfully sought endorsement (again against Chifley), and succeeded at the 1925 State election winning the third position, defeating Nationalist sitting member, Charles Rosenthal.

Following a statewide electoral redistribution, Kelly retained the seat of Bathurst when New South Wales reverted to single member electorates at the 1927 state election. Kelly was re-elected at the 1930 state election with over 60% of the vote.

He was a member of the Lang Labor while NSW Labor under Jack Lang was separated from the Federal executive of the Australian Labor Party between 1931 and 1936 but was defeated on preferences in the 1932 State election landslide that ended the premiership of Lang.

After three years working as the gatekeeper at the Sydney Cricket Ground (where William McKell sat on the board of trustees), Kelly regained the seat in the 1935 state election on preferences from the Federal Labor Party candidate whilst standing as a candidate for NSW Labor. Kelly retained the seat at the 1938, was unopposed in 1941, challenged in 1944, 1947, and 1950 state elections, again unopposed in 1953, and challenged in 1956, 1959, 1962, and 1965 state elections; winning each time.

In the William McKell Labor Government that came to power at the 1941 state election, Kelly was appointed to the following portfolios during his parliamentary career spanning 38 years; 24 of which were as a Minister:

- Minister for Health (1941 to 1950 and again, during 1960)
- Minister for Housing (1950 to 1952 and again, during 1954)
- Colonial Secretary (1952 to 1959)
- Minister for Immigration (1953–1959)
- Minister for Co-operative Societies (1954 to 1959)
- Chief Secretary and Minister for Tourist Activities (1959 to 1965)

During Kelly's service as a politician, it was alleged that some members of the McKell cabinet were involved in a large corrupt sly-grog operation, with one particular allegation (never proven but often made) that involved Kelly. In an interview not made public till 1997, McKell (who had died in 1985) alluded to discreditable actions on Kelly's part, while refusing to supply details:

"Kelly became an absolute load on the party... we won't say any more than that..."

Kelly died in 1967, as the sitting member for Bathurst. A portrait of Kelly by Australian artist Reg Campbell can be found in the permanent collection of Bathurst Regional Art Gallery.

New South Wales Legislative Assembly
Preceded by Charles Rosenthal	Member for Bathurst; 1925 – 1927; Served alongside: Fitzpatrick, Dooley	MMP abolished
New district MMP abolished	Member for Bathurst; 1927 – 1932	Succeeded by Gordon Wilkins
Preceded by Gordon Wilkins	Member for Bathurst; 1935 – 1967	Succeeded by Clive Osborne
Political offices
Preceded by Herbert FitzSimons	Minister for Health; 1941 – 1950	Succeeded by Maurice O'Sullivan
Preceded by Clive Evatt	Minister for Housing; 1950 – 1952	Succeeded by Clive Evatt
Preceded by Clive Evatt	Colonial/Chief Secretary of New South Wales; 1952 – 1965	Succeeded by Eric Willis
Preceded by Joshua Arthur	Minister for Immigration; 1953 – 1956	Vacant Title next held by Steve Mauger as Minister for Youth, Ethnic and Community Affairs
Preceded by Clive Evatt	Minister for Housing; 1954	Succeeded by John McGrath
Preceded by Clive Evatt	Minister for Co-operative Societies; 1954 – 1959	Succeeded by Abe Landa
Vacant Title last held by Joshua Arthur as Minister in Charge of Tourist; Activities and Immigration	Minister for Tourist Activities; 1959 – 1965	Succeeded by Eric Willis
New title	Minister for Tourist Activities; 1959 – 1965	Succeeded by Eric Willis
