= Clive Osborne =

Australian politician (1923–1998)

Clive Osborne MP

Member of the New South Wales Legislative Assembly for Bathurst
- In office 6 May 1967 – 28 August 1981
- Preceded by: Gus Kelly
- Succeeded by: Mick Clough

Personal details
- Born: Clive Geoffrey Osborne; 18 March 1923 Gunnedah, New South Wales
- Died: 25 March 1998 (aged 75) Duramana, near Bathurst, New South Wales
- Party: Country/National Party
- Spouse: Elizabeth Osborne (née Gordon)
- Children: 1 son, 1 daughter
- Occupation: Farmer

Clive Geoffrey Osborne (18 March 1923 – 25 March 1998) was an Australian politician. He was a Country Party/National Party member of the New South Wales Legislative Assembly from 1967 to 1981, representing the electorate of Bathurst.

== Early years ==
Osborne was born to carpenter Edward Osborne and his wife Harriet Rose Osborne. Educated at Bathurst Primary School and Bathurst High School and Bathurst College of Technical and Further Education; Osborne had active military duty during World War II, serving in the Royal Australian Navy during 1939 to 1945. He entered family furniture business in 1946 and was a reporter on Bathurst's local newspaper, The Western Advocate. In 1959, Osborne purchased properties at Duramana, north of Bathurst, and became a farmer.

Osborne was President of the Bathurst branch of the Returned Services League (Returned Serviceman's League) between 1959 and 1973. He was a Member of the Bathurst Land Board between 1960 and 1967, and a Member of Bathurst Legacy from 1961. His recreational interests include hockey and swimming and was President of the Bathurst Men's Hockey Association.

== New South Wales state politics ==
Osborne was endorsed as the Country Party candidate for the seat of Bathurst at the 1965 State election, running against sitting Labor Member, Gus Kelly. Osborne was unsuccessful, winning 28.5 per cent of the vote in a three-cornered contest which saw Kelly re-elected. Following the death of Kelly (who held the seat for nearly forty years), a by-election was held in 1967, and Osborne was elected on Liberal Party preferences. Osborne was re-elected at the 1968, 1971, 1973, 1976 and 1978 State elections.

Osborne contested the 1981 election, representing the National Country Party (as the Country Party was then known). An electoral redistribution had moved the solid Labor voting town of Lithgow from Blue Mountains to Bathurst, making Bathurst a notional Labor seat. The Labor Member for Blue Mountains, Mick Clough moved seat to contest Bathurst and won with a margin of 0.05%. Osborne unsuccessfully contested the 1984 election in an unusual move where the National Party (following another name change) endorsed two candidates.

During his time in Parliament, Osborne was a strong proponent of decentralisation programs.

New South Wales Legislative Assembly
Preceded by Gus Kelly	Member for Bathurst; 1967 – 1981	Succeeded by Mick Clough
