= Gerard Martin (politician) =

Australian politician

Member of the New South Wales Legislative Assembly for Bathurst
- In office 27 March 1999 – 26 March 2011
- Preceded by: Mick Clough
- Succeeded by: Paul Toole

Personal details
- Born: Gerard Francis Martin; 28 May 1946 (age 80)
- Party: Labor Party
- Spouse: Kathy Martin
- Children: 2 sons
- Occupation: Administration manager, politician

Gerard Francis Martin (born 28 May 1946) is a former Australian politician who was a member of the New South Wales Legislative Assembly representing the electorate of Bathurst between 1999 and 2011 for the Labor Party. He and is married with two children.

== Career ==
Martin worked as an administrator in the coal industry for 30 years. He was a councillor on the Lithgow City Council from 1974 to 1999 and was the longest-serving mayor of Lithgow, for sixteen years. Prior to entering New South Wales politics, he was previously deputy chair, Central West Regional Development Board, and is a former chairman of the Blayney (Abattoir) County Council.

In Parliament, he was Government Whip and was a member of both the Standing Committee on Natural Resource Management and the Standing Orders and Procedure Committee.

Martin, a Catholic, expressed his opposition to stem cell research in 2007 by voting against legislation allowing the practice. The bill subsequently passed.

On 19 October 2010, Martin announced his decision to not seek re-election for the seat of Bathurst at the 2011 state election.

New South Wales Legislative Assembly
Preceded by Mick Clough	Member for Bathurst; 1999 – 2011	Succeeded by Paul Toole
