= Gerard Martin (public servant) =

Australian public servant

Gerard Martin PSM

13th Official Secretary to the Governor-General of Australia
- Incumbent
- Assumed office 1 July 2024
- Monarch: Charles III
- Governor-General: Sam Mostyn
- Preceded by: Paul Singer

Personal details
- Occupation: Public servant

Gerard David Martin is an Australian public servant and the current official secretary to the governor-general of Australia, serving Sam Mostyn since July 2024.

== Career ==
Before becoming secretary to the governor-general, Martin worked for over 25 years in the public service in a variety of roles. This mainly included the Department of the Prime Minister and Cabinet (PM&C). Upon his selection as the next secretary to the governor-general, he was previously the First Assistant Secretary at PM&C. This role included the delivery of ministerial, parliamentary communications as well as the organising of official visits and functions led by the prime minister. Martin also took charge of the prime minister's official residences.

Martin oversaw Australia's response to the death of Queen Elizabeth II; including supporting the prime minister, Anthony Albanese, throughout the state funeral of the Queen and the organising of the National Memorial Service in Canberra.

In the 2023 King's Birthday Honours, Martin was awarded a Public Service Medal (PSM) "for outstanding public service in delivering advice and support to the Prime Minister and his Office, and to the Department of the Prime Minister and Cabinet".

Government offices
| Preceded by Paul Singer | Official Secretary to the Governor-General of Australia; 2024–present | Incumbent |
