= James Kemp (Australian politician) =

Scottish-born Australian politician

James Ruthven Kemp (1833 – 28 August 1873) was a Scottish-born Australian politician.

A businessman, he migrated to Australia around 1860. In 1864 he was elected to the New South Wales Legislative Assembly for Bathurst, but he resigned in 1866. Kemp died in Sydney in 1873.

New South Wales Legislative Assembly
Preceded by James Hart	Member for Bathurst; 1864–1866	Succeeded by William Suttor
