= William Young (Australian politician) =

Australian politician

William White Young (1852 – 23 December 1915) was an Australian politician.

He was born in Ayrshire in Scotland to farmer Archibald Young and Mary White. He was a coal miner in England before migrating to New Zealand in 1879, where he was immediately confined to a Dunedin hospital for a year. In 1881 he moved to New South Wales, becoming an engine driver by 1883; he was also involved in early attempts at unionisation. Subsequently a publican at Bathurst, he was elected to the corresponding seat in the New South Wales Legislative Assembly in 1900, with the support of both the Protectionist and Labour parties. He sat as a Protectionist and then as a Progressive, serving until his defeat in 1907. Young died at Moore Park in 1915.

New South Wales Legislative Assembly
Preceded by Francis Bathurst Suttor	Member for Bathurst; 1900–1907	Succeeded by John Miller
