= Ernest Durack =

Australian politician

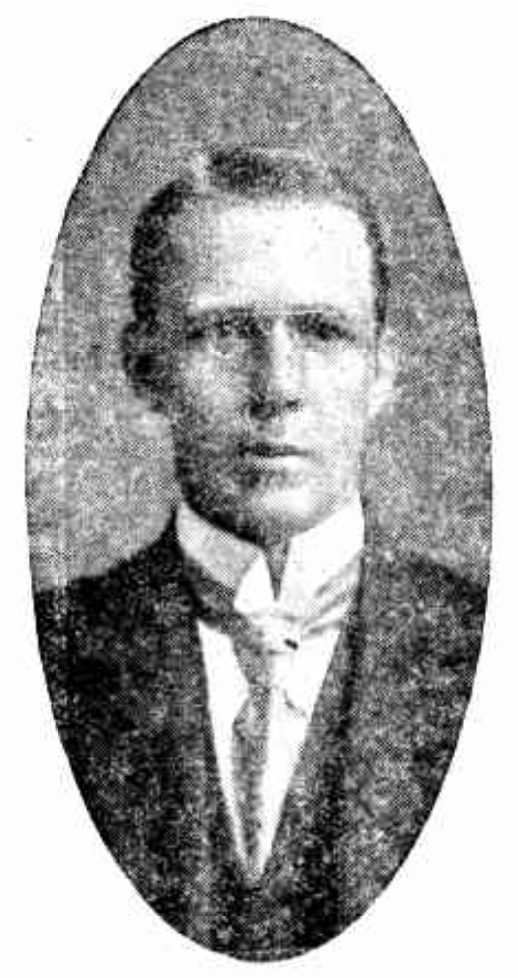
Ernest Durack, Labor candidate for Bathurst, c1913

Ernest Durack (10 August 1882 – 16 November 1967) was an Australian politician. He was a member of the New South Wales Legislative Assembly from 1913 until 1917, and the leader of the Labor Party (ALP) in New South Wales for three months until February 1917.

Durack was born near Bathurst. He was the son of a storekeeper and was educated at All Saints' College, Bathurst. In 1903, he married Cora Armstrong at Rydal and had two sons and three daughters with her. He found employment as a farmer and clerk until his entry to parliament at the 1913 election when he won the seat of Bathurst. In parliament his strong oratory skills were quickly noticed and he became Chairman of Committees (deputy Speaker).

In 1916, the ALP split over the question of conscription in World War I. Labor premier William Holman supported Prime Minister Billy Hughes in opposing the party's anti-conscription policy and he and 28 supporters were expelled from the party. Holman and his followers remained in power by forming a coalition government with the Liberal Reform Party of Charles Wade on 15 November 1916 and the ALP became the opposition with 21 supporters in a house of 90 members. Durack defeated John Storey in the ballot for leadership of the Labor Party and became the Leader of the opposition. It was said that he was a much harder worker than Storey.

In early 1917, Holman called a snap general election. Durack was scheduled to deliver the ALP's policy speech on 21 February but on that morning he announced his resignation from the party leadership and as the ALP candidate for Bathurst. Mystery surrounded his actions for some years until it was discovered that he had fathered a daughter, born in August 1916, with Winifred McNab, and he had resigned because of a fear that this would become a public scandal during the election campaign. He was succeeded as ALP leader by Storey.

After leaving parliament, Durack enlisted as a private in the Australian Imperial Force in September 1917 and saw service in Great Britain. He was invalided back to Australia in August 1918 and his movements from then until 1950, when he was a storekeeper near Bathurst, are unknown. Cora Armstrong died in 1956 and Durack subsequently married McNab.

New South Wales Legislative Assembly
Preceded by John Miller	Member for Bathurst; 1913 – 1917	Succeeded by Valentine Johnston
Party political offices
Preceded by William Holman	Leader of the Australian Labor Party in New South Wales; 1916 – 1917	Succeeded by John Storey
