= Electoral district of Bathurst =

State electoral district of New South Wales, Australia

Bathurst New South Wales—Legislative Assembly
- Interactive map of district boundaries from the 2023 state election
- State: New South Wales
- Dates current: 1859–present
- MP: Paul Toole
- Party: National
- Namesake: Bathurst
- Electors: 59,476 (2023)
- Area: 14,992.77 km^{2} (5,788.7 sq mi)
- Demographic: Provincial and rural
Electorates around Bathurst:
Dubbo	Upper Hunter	Upper Hunter
Orange	Bathurst	Hawkesbury; Blue Mountains
Cootamundra	Goulburn	Wollondilly

Bathurst is an electoral district of the Legislative Assembly of the Australian state of New South Wales. It has been represented by Paul Toole of the Nationals since 2011.

Bathurst is a regional electorate which encompasses the entirety of the local government areas of Bathurst Region, the City of Lithgow, Blayney Shire, Oberon Shire plus the southern part of Mid-Western Regional Council (including Rylstone, Kandos and Ilford).

== History ==
Bathurst was created in 1859, partly replacing Western Boroughs. Between 1920 and 1927, it absorbed parts of Hartley and Orange and elected three members under proportional representation. In 1927 Bathurst, Hartley and Orange were recreated as single-member electorates. It was held by the Labor party for 20 years until the Coalition's landslide win in 2011, where the Nationals candidate Paul Toole recorded a swing of 36.7%, the largest in state history. Of particular note was the suburb of Eglinton, where labour support plummeted from 854 of 1,690 (50.5%) to 180 of 1,690 (10.7%) first preference votes; a precipitous decline of 79%. This trend was somewhat reversed in 2015, with Toole being re-elected by a margin of around 15,000 votes, a majority of almost two-thirds of the vote, but still down from the approximate 20,000 margin from 2011.

== Members for Bathurst ==
(1859–1920, 1 member)
Member	Party	Term						
John Findlater Clements	None	1859–1860						
James Hart	None	1860–1864						
James Kemp	None	1864–1866						
William Suttor, Sr.	None	1866–1872						
Edward Combes	None	1872–1874						
Francis Suttor	None	1875–1887						
William Cortis	Free Trade	1887–1889						
William Paul	Free Trade	1889–1891						
Francis Suttor	Protectionist	1891–1894						
Sydney Smith	Free Trade	1894–1898						
Francis Suttor	Protectionist	1898–1900						
William Young	Protectionist	1900–1901						
William Young	Progressive	1901–1907						
John Miller	Liberal Reform	1907–1913						
Ernest Durack	Labor	1913–1917						
Valentine Johnston	Labor	1917–1920						
(1920–1927, 3 members)
Member	Party	Term	Member	Party	Term	Member	Party	Term
Valentine Johnston	Labor	1920–1922	James Dooley	Labor	1920–1927	John Fitzpatrick	Nationalist	1920–1927
Charles Rosenthal	Nationalist	1922–1925	James Dooley	Labor	1920–1927	John Fitzpatrick	Nationalist	1920–1927
Gus Kelly	Labor	1925–1927	James Dooley	Labor	1920–1927	John Fitzpatrick	Nationalist	1920–1927
(1927–present, 1 member)
Member	Party	Term						
Gus Kelly	Labor	1927–1932						
Gordon Wilkins	Country	1932–1935						
Gus Kelly	Labor	1935–1967						
Clive Osborne	Country	1967–1981						
Mick Clough	Labor	1981–1988						
David Berry	Liberal	1988–1991						
Mick Clough	Labor	1991–1999						
Gerard Martin	Labor	1999–2011						
Paul Toole	National	2011–present						

== Election results ==
2023 New South Wales state election: Bathurst
Party	Candidate	Votes	%	±%
National	Paul Toole	29,873	57.0	+1.9
Labor	Cameron Shaw	8,442	16.1	−4.4
Shooters, Fishers, Farmers	Craig Sinclair	3,850	7.3	−7.4
Greens	Kay Nankervis	3,595	6.9	+1.3
Independent	Martin Ticehurst	3,449	6.6	+6.6
Legalise Cannabis	Antony Zbik	1,472	2.8	+2.8
Liberal Democrats	Burchell Wilson	1,092	2.1	+2.1
Sustainable Australia	Michael Begg	626	1.2	−1.4
Total formal votes		52,399	97.4	+0.4
Informal votes		1,400	2.6	−0.4
Turnout		53,799	90.5	−1.1
Two-party-preferred result
National	Paul Toole	32,850	73.6	+5.7
Labor	Cameron Shaw	11,801	26.4	−5.7
National hold		Swing	+5.7	
