= Francis Bathurst Suttor =

Pastoralist, politician, sheep and horse breeder in New South Wales, Australia

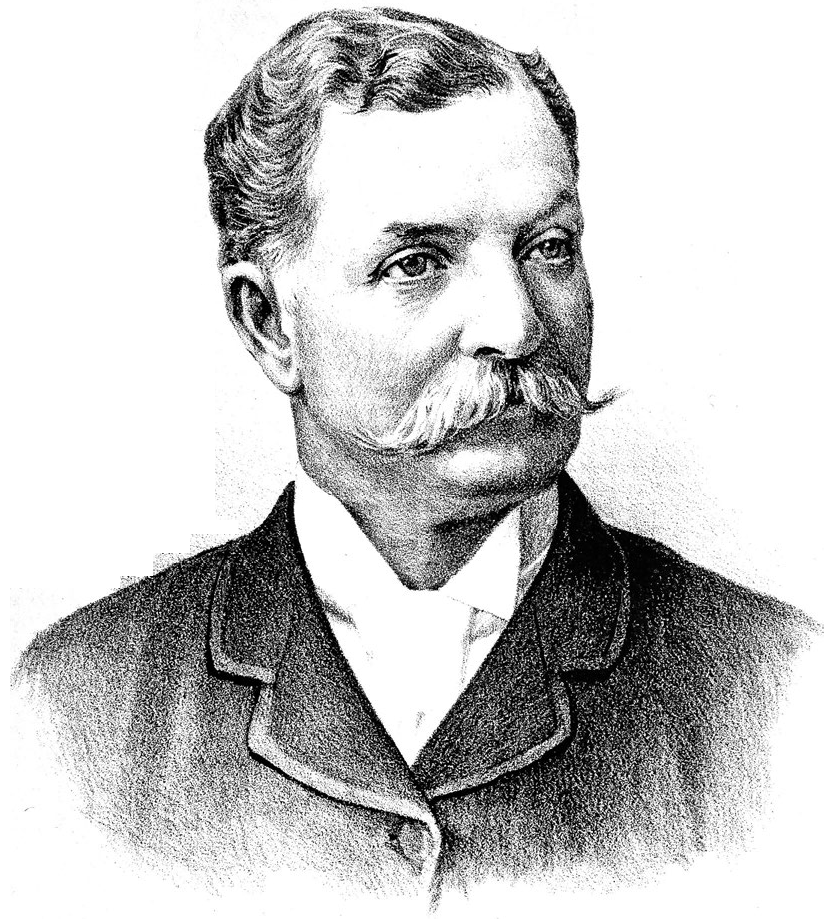
Suttor in 1889

Sir Francis Bathurst Suttor (30 April 1839 – 4 April 1915) was an Australian pastoralist, politician, and sheep and horse breeder.

== Early life ==
Suttor was born in Bathurst, New South Wales, the son of pastoralist William Henry Suttor and his wife, Charlotte Augusta Anne née Francis. Francis Bathurst Suttor was a grandson of George Suttor. F. B. Suttor was educated at The King's School, Parramatta, and from age 19 managed his father's properties near Bathurst. He took up the properties Redbank and Katella near Wellington, New South Wales in 1863, and later Bradwardine at Bathurst. In July 1863 Suttor married Emily Jane (1841–1911), daughter of Thomas Jarman Hawkins (1909-1885) of Walmer, Bathurst. Suttor made a study of sheep-breeding; in 1868 he bought 100 merino ewes from C. C. Cox of Brombee and the use of the sire Brombee Pet for two months; Suttor maintained the high standards of Mudgee sheep. With ewes bought from James Alexander Gibson Suttor founded a stud of Tasmanian merinos at Bradwardine that were successful in shows. From a Cleveland Bay sire, Suttor also bred a superior type of horse for coaches which were extensively used in Australia at the time.

== Political career ==
On 2 January 1875 Suttor was elected to the New South Wales Legislative Assembly as a free trader for Bathurst, in bitter campaign against Edmund Webb. Suttor was Minister of Justice and Public Instruction in the second ministry of Sir Henry Parkes from 22 March 1877 to 16 August 1877, and held the same position in the third Parkes ministry from December 1878 to April 1880 when the portfolio was separated with Suttor becoming Minister of Justice from May to August 1880, then Postmaster-General until November 1881, when he became Minister of Public Instruction until January 1883. He declined a position in the fifth ministry of Sir John Robertson.

From February 1886 to January 1887 Suttor was Postmaster-General in the ministry of Sir Patrick Jennings. Suttor fell out with Sir Henry, and in 1887 changed his position on tariffs, supporting protection as a means of addressing falling rural prices. He was defeated as a Protectionist Party candidate at the 1887 election.

Suttor was appointed Minister of Public Instruction in the second ministry of George Dibbs in January 1889, however he was unsuccessful at the 1889 Bathurst election, with Parkes and Webb campaigning against him, and was appointed to the Legislative Council in February 1889. He resigned from the Legislative Council in 1891 to again stand as a protectionist candidate for the 1891 Bathurst election and was elected with a small margin. He was again Minister of Public Instruction in the third Dibbs ministry from October 1891 to August 1894. In 1894 Suttor represented New South Wales at the Ottawa Colonial Conference. The Dibbs government was defeated at the 1894 election and Suttor again lost his seat.

While Suttor initially opposed Parkes' federal proposals in 1891, he returned to the Legislative Assembly as part of Edmund Barton's National Federal Party at the 1898 Bathurst election, serving for a final term. He was re-appointed to the Legislative Council in June 1900, where he was the Representative of the governments of William Lyne and John See, holding the sinecure office of Vice-President of the Executive Council. He served in these roles until 23 May 1903 when he was appointed President of the Legislative Council, a position he held until his death. On 29 April 1914 the members of the Legislative Council gave a banquet in honour of Suttor's 75th birthday. In replying to the toast of his health Suttor mentioned that his father, uncle (John), brother (William) and himself had, between them, given over 80 years of service in parliament. Suttor also said that there were then 138 living descendants of his father and mother.

== Other interests ==
Suttor was also a trustee of Australian Museum and the Art Gallery of New South Wales and was a member of the senate of the University of Sydney. Suttor was always interested in the primary producer and was president of the New South Wales Sheepbreeders' Association 1903–15, and president of the Royal Agricultural Society of New South Wales. Suttor also served as the president of the Australian Club. Francis' wife Charlotte was a board member for The Infants' Home Child and Family Services, a home for unmarried mothers and their babies, she served on the committee between 1893 and 1894.

Suttor died on 4 April 1915 (aged 75) at his Darling Point residence, survived by three sons and five daughters. After a state funeral, Suttor was buried in the Anglican section of South Head cemetery. A bust of Suttor by Nelson Illingworth is owned by the Legislative Council, Sydney.

== Honours ==
Suttor was knighted in 1903 for his service as President of the Legislative Council.

== See also ==
- Edgerley, Elizabeth Bay

New South Wales Legislative Assembly
Preceded by Edward Combes	Member for Bathurst; 1875 – 1887	Succeeded by William Cortis
Preceded by William Paul	Member for Bathurst; 1891 – 1894	Succeeded by Sydney Smith
Preceded by Sydney Smith	Member for Bathurst; 1898 – 1900	Succeeded by William Young
Political offices
Preceded by Joseph Docker	Minister of Justice and Public Instruction; 1877	Succeeded by John Lackey
Preceded by Joseph Leary	Minister of Justice and Public Instruction; 1878 – 1880	ministry divided into Justice and Public Instruction
Preceded by Himself as Minister of Justice and Public Instruction	Minister of Justice; 1880	Succeeded by Joseph Innes
Preceded by Saul Samuel	Postmaster-General; 1881	Succeeded by Stephen Campbell Brown
Preceded by John Robertson	Minister of Public Instruction; 1881 – 1883	Succeeded by George Reid
Preceded by Daniel O'Connor	Postmaster-General; 1886 – 1887	Succeeded by Charles James Roberts
Preceded by James Inglis	Minister of Public Instruction; Jan – Mar 1889	Succeeded by Joseph Carruthers
Preceded by Joseph Carruthers	Minister of Public Instruction; 1891 – 1894	Succeeded by Jacob Garrard
Preceded by Kenneth Mackay	Vice-President of the Executive Council; Representative of the Government in the Legislative Council; 1900 – 1903	Succeeded by Kenneth Mackay
New South Wales Legislative Council
Preceded by Sir John Lackey	President of the Legislative Council; 1903 – 1915	Succeeded by Frederick Flowers
Non-profit organization positions
Preceded by Sir John See	President of the Royal Agricultural Society of New South Wales; 1907 – 1915	Succeeded by Samuel Hordern
