= Harry Smith (Australian soldier) =

Australian army officer (1933–2023)

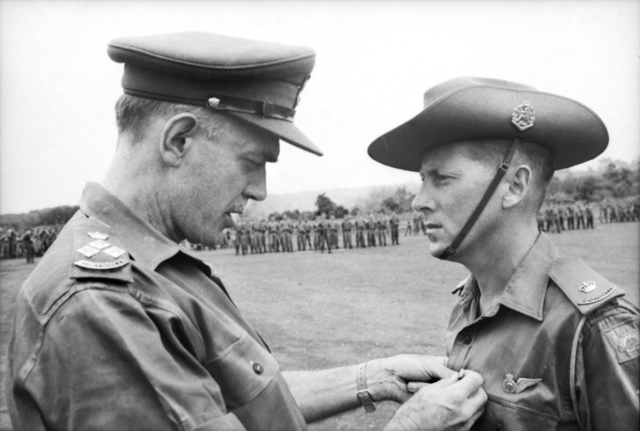
- Smith invested with the Military Cross from Brigadier Oliver David Jackson, 1967
- Born: Harry Arthur Smith; 25 July 1933; Hobart, Tasmania, Australia
- Died: 20 August 2023 (aged 90); Buderim, Queensland, Australia
- Military career
- Allegiance: Australia
- Branch: Australian Army
- Service years: 1952–1976
- Rank: Lieutenant Colonel
- Service number: 6776
- Commands: Parachute Training School; 1 Commando Company; D Company, 6th Battalion, Royal Australian Regiment
- Conflicts: Malayan Emergency; Vietnam War; Battle of Long Tan
- Awards: Star of Gallantry; Military Cross; Knight of the National Order of Vietnam; Gallantry Cross (Vietnam)

Lieutenant Colonel Harry Arthur Smith, SG, MC (25 July 1933 – 20 August 2023) was a senior officer in the Australian Army, seeing service during the Malayan Emergency and the Vietnam War. He was the Officer Commanding D Company, 6th Battalion, Royal Australian Regiment (D Coy, 6 RAR) during the Battle of Long Tan on 18 August 1966.

== Early years ==
Harry Arthur Smith was born in Hobart, Tasmania, on 25 July 1933.

== Military career ==
After service as a National Serviceman, Smith joined the Australian Regular Army and graduated as second lieutenant from the Officer Cadet School, Portsea. He was subsequently posted to the 2nd Battalion, Royal Australian Regiment in 1955 and later served during the Malayan Emergency between 1955 and 1957.

=== Battle of Long Tan ===
From 8 June 1966 to 14 June 1967, Smith, then a major, was Officer Commanding D Coy, 6 RAR. On 18 August, after heavy mortar shelling of the Australian base at Nui Dat the previous night, companies from 6 RAR were sent out to locate the Vietnamese units involved. Smith led the 105 soldiers of D Coy and the 3 man NZ Artillery Party out on patrol, but at 3:15 pm, while patrolling a rubber plantation at Long Tan that afternoon, they encountered a reinforced regiment-sized Vietnamese force (the Viet Cong 275th Regiment, supported by the North Vietnamese Army 806 Battalion and D440 and D445 Battalions) attempting to advance on the base. A monsoon struck at the same time, but Smith organised his forces to successfully hold off the assault, while coordinating support from Australian, New Zealand, and United States artillery units back at Nui Dat. D Coy was reinforced at 6:55 pm by a B Company Platoon then A Company in APCs, the Vietnamese having started to withdraw. 18 Australians were killed and 24 wounded during the Battle of Long Tan, but under Smith's command, D Coy had fended off a numerically superior force, with at least 245 Vietnamese confirmed as killed, and another 500 believed wounded. 800 enemy killed or died from wounds were listed in records found in 1969. 9 Delta Company men were given gallantry awards, but many of these had been downgraded from the original nomination: Smith's leadership of his men during the fierce fighting saw him recommended for the Distinguished Service Order, but he instead received the Military Cross. Smith is portrayed by Travis Fimmel in the 2019 film Danger Close: The Battle of Long Tan.

=== Post-war service ===
Following service in Vietnam, Smith commanded 1 Commando Company at Georges Heights and was later posted as the inaugural Commanding Officer/Chief Instructor of the Parachute Training School. Smith left the army in 1976 after a parachuting injury.

=== Upgrading of award ===
On 14 August 2008, after years of campaigning for better recognition of Long Tan veterans, Smith's Military Cross was upgraded to the Star of Gallantry (the Australian honours system replacement for the Commonwealth Distinguished Service Order for gallantry). On the same day, two others who fought at Long Tan had their bravery awards upgraded to correspond to the original nominations. On 9 March 2011, at the Maryborough Military and Colonial Museum, Smith was presented with the Star of Gallantry by local MP Paul Neville. Many of the Long Tan veterans were in attendance for the ceremony.

== Death ==
Harry Smith died in Buderim, Queensland, on 20 August 2023, only 2 days after the Anniversary of the Battle of Long Tan, at the age of 90.

== Honours and awards ==

Ribbon	Description	Notes
Ribbon of the Star of Gallantry	Star of Gallantry	Awarded 18 August 2008 for leadership and command whilst in command of Delta Company, 6 RAR, during the Battle of Long Tan in 1966.
Ribbon of the Military Cross	Military Cross	Awarded for leadership and gallantry when commanding Delta Company, 6 RAR, during the battle of LONG TAN on 18 August 1966.
	Australian Active Service Medal 1945–1975	With clasps for active service in Malaya and Vietnam.
	General Service Medal 1918–1962	With Malaya clasp for service in the Malayan Emergency.
	Vietnam Medal	For service in South Vietnam.
	Defence Force Service Medal	With clasp, for 20–24 years service with the ADF
	National Medal	15–24 years service with an eligible organisation.
Ribbon of the ADM	Australian Defence Medal	For eligible service in the ADF.
	Anniversary of National Service 1951–1972 Medal	For service in post-war National Service schemes.
	National Order of Vietnam	Awarded by the Republic of Vietnam for his command at Long Tan
	Vietnam Gallantry Cross (with Bronze Palm)	Awarded by the Republic of Vietnam for Command of D Coy 6 RAR at Long Tan, with Unit Citation. Unit Commanders are entitled to Medal as well as Citation.
	Vietnam Campaign Medal	Awarded by the Republic of Vietnam for service in South Vietnam during the Vietnam War.
	Pingat Jasa Malaysia	Awarded by the king and government of Malaysia for service in Malaysia.
	Infantry Combat Badge	
	US Presidential Unit Citation	
	Vietnam Presidential Unit Citation	
	Australian Unit Citation for Gallantry	
	Parachute Jump Instructor badge	
	US Master Parachutist Badge	
