= Danger Close: The Battle of Long Tan =

Australian war film about the Battle of Long Tan during the Vietnam War

- Theatrical film poster
- Directed by: Kriv Stenders
- Screenplay by: Stuart Beattie; James Nicholas; Karel Segers; Paul Sullivan; Jack Brislee
- Produced by: Stuart Beattie; Tony H. Noun; Silvio Salom; Andrew Mann; Martin Walsh; John Schwarz; Michael Schwarz
- Starring: Travis Fimmel; Luke Bracey; Daniel Webber; Alexander England; Aaron Glennane; Nicholas Hamilton; Myles Pollard; Matt Doran; Anthony Hayes; Richard Roxburgh
- Cinematography: Ben Nott
- Edited by: Veronika Jenet
- Music by: Caitlin Yeo
- Production companies: Screen Queensland; Screen Australia; Ingenious Media; Saboteur Media; Deeper Water Films; Red Dune Films; Sunjive Studios; THN Nominees; Hoosegow Productions
- Distributed by: Transmission Films
- Release date: August 8, 2019 (Australia)
- Running time: 118 minutes
- Country: Australia
- Language: English
- Budget: $24 million AUD
- Box office: $2 million

Danger Close: The Battle of Long Tan is a 2019 Australian war film about the Battle of Long Tan during the Vietnam War. It is directed by Kriv Stenders and stars Travis Fimmel.

== Plot ==
In August 1966, the 1st Australian Task Force (1 ATF) base at Nui Dat sustains a night-time mortar attack by enemy forces. During the attack, Major Harry Smith is cool under fire, ordering his men to take cover and stand to, while other soldiers don't take it seriously, playing cards or drinking beer. The base fends off the attack with counter-battery fire, killing the enemy mortar crew. Major Smith harshly reprimands Private Paul Large for carelessly firing his weapon during the attack.

The next morning, Major Smith volunteers his unit, Delta Company, 6th Battalion, Royal Australian Regiment (6 RAR), to search a nearby rubber tree plantation at Long Tân where the mortar fire originated, but Bravo Company is sent instead. Bravo finds no surviving enemy forces.

The next day, Delta Company is sent to relieve Bravo, which means that its members will miss a concert of Australian musicians Little Pattie and Col Joye and the Joy Boys set for that afternoon. Finding fresh tracks leading away from the mortar firing sites, Delta moves to follow the enemy forces. 11 Platoon takes the lead and makes contact with a small enemy patrol. It then penetrates further into the plantation, widening the gap with the rest of the company.

11 Platoon comes under heavy attack and radios the artillery units back at Nui Dat to lay down fire dangerously close to its position to hold back the enemy force. 10 Platoon moves up to reinforce 11, but is unable to get through. 11 Platoon becomes isolated, in danger of being overrun. Large goes on an unauthorized scouting mission and finds a way to reach 11 Platoon from 12 Platoon’s position.

Back at Nui Dat, Brigadier Oliver David Jackson is hesitant to commit reinforcements and orders Delta to withdraw. Major Smith refuses to leave 11 Platoon behind and has Lieutenant David Sabben lead a patrol guided by Large to 11 Platoon’s position to bring survivors back. Low on ammunition and under heavy rain, Major Smith pleads for a helicopter resupply. The senior Royal Australian Air Force (RAAF) officer at Nui Dat, Group Captain Peter Raw, does not want to risk aircraft with a hot landing zone in the rain. However, two RAAF Iroquois pilots, Flight Lieutenant Francis Patrick (Frank) Riley and Flight Lieutenant Robert George (Bob) Grandin, volunteer to support D Company, flying in under heavy fire to drop supplies.

Jackson finally agrees to send reinforcements to rescue Delta even though this will leave the base open to a possible attack. Now resupplied, but still outnumbered, Major Smith reorganizes his forces to successfully hold off the assault. The relief force of M113 armoured personnel carriers and infantry from Nui Dat finally arrives and the enemy has to withdraw, but not before Large is shot and killed. A roll call reveals the names of the men who died in the battle. Major Smith bids farewell to Large as his body is removed by helicopter.

== Cast ==
- Travis Fimmel as Major Harry Smith
- Daniel Webber as Private Paul Large
- Luke Bracey as Sergeant Bob Buick
- Richard Roxburgh as Brigadier David Jackson
- Nicholas Hamilton as Private Noel Grimes
- Matt Doran as Major Noel Ford
- Lasarus Ratuere as Corporal Buddy Lea
- Stephen Peacocke as Lieutenant Adrian Roberts
- Myles Pollard as Flight Lieutenant Frank Riley
- Uli Latukefu as Bombardier Ray Ngatai
- Anthony Hayes as Lieutenant Colonel Colin Townsend
- Sam Parsonson as Lieutenant David Sabben
- Alexander England as Warrant Officer Class Two Jack Kirby
- Sean Lynch as Sergeant Paddy Todd
- Aaron Glenane as Captain Morrie Stanley
- Emmy Dougall as Little Pattie
- Mojean Aria as Second Lieutenant Gordon Sharp
- Travis Jeffrey as Second Lieutenant Geoff Kendal
- Tom Yaxley as Sergeant Neil Rankin
- Sam Cotton as Corporal Phil 'Doc' Dobson
- Lincoln Lewis as Private Kevin Graham
- Ben Esler as Gunner Ken Deacon
- Jullian Cullen as Private Frank Topp

== Production ==
Production commenced in 2018 with the script completed in June 2014. Principal photography took place between May and July 2018 at the Village Roadshow Studios in Queensland and locations around Pimpama, Kingaroy and Nerang.

=== Casting ===
On 28 February 2018, Travis Fimmel was announced as the lead actor, playing the role of Major Harry Smith. Fimmel described the role as "a big responsibility".

The initial casting call was for 30 principal cast and bit part roles, and 100–200 Australians with combat experience in Iraq and Afghanistan as extras.

== Reception ==
The review aggregator Rotten Tomatoes reported that 71% of critics have given the film a positive review based on 35 reviews, with an average rating of 6.2/10. The site's critics' consensus reads: "Danger Close is problematic as a history lesson, but still offers viewers an involving look at life in the trenches of a real-life conflict."

The Sydney Morning Herald wrote "Telling these stories so that we can follow the details is rare. Director Kriv Stenders has made the reality of the day accessible and gripping for a non-military audience."

Flicks Australia wrote the film was a "patriotic but problematic" Australian war film turning down the context of the war, that being an intervention by two superpowers that was veiled in imperialistic action and ignored the deeply existential crisis that existed during the conflict. The film presenting a 2019 story of "sprawling and swarming hordes of Asiatic enemies" against a morally certain ANZAC force was deeply problematic, comparing it to the propaganda-like 1968 film The Green Berets that infamously ignored the muddy ideology behind the war.

Writing for The Curb, film critic Travis Johnson noted that "Danger Close’s boots-on-the-ground approach is intentional, and its focus is deliberate though the film itself does not reflect the cultural introspection and skepticism Australians tend to give towards media depictions of war films. Reflecting on the usage of the song "I Was Only 19", the musical choice underlies "an attempt not to fall to blind patriotism" in an "unjust war". Travis Johnson comments juggling historical, dramatic, and political demands with considerable dexterity, and the result is a film whose place in the Australian pantheon is assured.".

Writing for The Hollywood Reporter, Harry Windsor described the film as "both familiar and diffuse, with thinly sketched variations on a bronzed theme rather than characters" and presenting the story with "tone-deaf triumphalism", though he noted that "digital effects are kept to a refreshing minimum".

ScreenDaily also commented that the film's "blinkered nature" in presenting a narrow tone of the film in a controversial and unpopular war was a far less welcomed feature.

=== Accolades ===
Award	Category	Subject	Result	Ref
AACTA Awards (9th)	Best Cinematography	Ben Nott	Nominated	
AACTA Awards (9th)	Best Original Music Score	Caitlin Yeo	Nominated	
AACTA Awards (9th)	Best Sound	Liam Egan	Won	
