= Star of Gallantry =

- Medal and ribbon
- Type: Military decoration
- Awarded for: "Acts of great heroism or conspicuous gallantry in action in circumstances of great peril"
- Description: A gold-plated silver Federation Star. The ribbon has a design of chevrons of light orange alternating with chevrons of deep orange angled at 60 degrees.
- Presented by: Governor-General of Australia
- Eligibility: Members of the Australian Defence Force (ADF) and others deemed eligible by the Minister for Defence
- Post-nominals: SG
- Status: Currently awarded
- Established: 15 January 1991
- First award: 26 November 2006
- Final award: 27 March 2026

Highlights
- Total awarded posthumously: 2
- Total recipients: 11

Order of Wear
- Next (higher): Commander of the Royal Victorian Order
- Next (lower): Star of Courage
- Related: Victoria Cross for Australia; Medal for Gallantry; Unit Citation for Gallantry

The Star of Gallantry (SG) is a military decoration awarded to personnel of the Australian Defence Force (ADF) and other persons recognised by the Minister for Defence. It is awarded for acts of great heroism or conspicuous gallantry in action in circumstances of great peril. It is the second highest of the military gallantry awards in the Australian Honours System, only surpassed by the Victoria Cross or Victoria Cross for Australia (VC).

== Background ==
The SG was introduced on 15 January 1991, replacing the Imperial equivalents, (the Distinguished Conduct Medal and the Conspicuous Gallantry Medal Air and Naval), as second level awards to Other Ranks and ratings. The SG also replaced the Distinguished Service Order, in its role as an award to officers for gallantry. The SG has no rank requirements and all service personnel are eligible. The UK equivalent is the Conspicuous Gallantry Cross (CGC) and the US equivalents are the Distinguished Service Cross, Navy Cross and Air Force Cross.

Recipients of the Star of Gallantry are entitled to use the post-nominal letters "SG". Recipients of the award are normally announced in the Commonwealth of Australia Gazette. Since its inception eight awards have been made.

== Government allowance ==
Section 102 of the Veterans’ Entitlements Act 1986 provides for a decoration allowance of A$2.10 per fortnight for eligible veterans who have been awarded certain Australian military decorations, including the Star of Gallantry. The allowance is subject to the eligibility requirements in s 102, which include requirements concerning the veteran’s entitlement to a pension under Part II of the Act.

== Description ==
- The Star of Gallantry is a gold-plated silver Federation Star ensigned with the Crown of Saint Edward. The obverse displays a smaller Federation Star, which is surrounded by stylised flames. This image represents action under fire.
- The reverse shows a horizontal panel superimposed on a stepped background.
- The medal is suspended from a 32 millimetre-wide ribbon by a narrow bar, which is engraved with the words "For Gallantry". The ribbon has a design of chevrons of light orange alternating with chevrons of deep orange angled at 60 degrees.

== Recipients ==
Name	Rank	Date awarded	Citation	Notes
A	Sergeant	26 November 2006	For conspicuous gallantry in action and leadership as a Commando Section Commander in the Special Forces Task Group, whilst deployed on Operation SLIPPER 2006.	from 4RAR (Commando) became the first recipient of the Star of Gallantry. Sergeant A was awarded the medal for his actions whilst assisting with the extraction of threatened coalition forces in Orūzgān Province, Afghanistan. The medal was presented by Governor General Michael Jeffery.
Raymond Jesse Allsopp	Captain	17 July 2017	For acts of gallantry in action as a member of 2nd/5th Australian Cavalry Commando Squadron, 2nd/7th Australian Cavalry Commando Regiment during Operation Oboe Two to the North East of Balikpapan, Timor on 1 July 1945.	Allsopp served with the 2/5th Commando Squadron and was killed in action at Balikpapan, on 1 July 1945. The award was made 72 years after Allsopp's death following a review by the Defence Honours and Awards Appeals Tribunal, which upgraded his previously awarded Mention in Despatches to a Star of Gallantry.
B	Private	9 June 2014	For conspicuous gallantry in action in circumstances of great peril while on operations on Operation SLIPPER.	
Warran Frank Cowan	Pilot Officer	27 March 2026	For acts of conspicuous gallantry in action in circumstances of great peril on 22 July 1942 as the aircraft captain of Lockheed Hudson A16-201.	He was previously awarded the Medal for Gallantry in October 2023, with the award being cancelled upon upgrade to the Star of Gallantry in March 2026.
D	Sergeant	13 June 2011	For acts of conspicuous gallantry in action in circumstances of great peril with the Special Operations Task Group.	
John Wesley Matten	Private	20 August 2026	For acts of conspicuous gallantry in action in circumstances of great peril with the 3rd Special Air Service Squadron on 18 January 1967 on operations in South Vietnam.	
P	Sergeant	26 January 2011	For acts of conspicuous gallantry in action in circumstances of great peril while on Operation SLIPPER in Afghanistan.	
Kerry Michael Rooney	Lance Corporal	28 October 2025	For conspicuous gallantry in action in circumstances of great peril as a Section Commander 5 Platoon, Bravo Company, 6th Battalion, The Royal Australian Regiment during Operation BRIBIE, South Vietnam on 17 February 1967.	
Harry Smith, MC	Lieutenant Colonel	18 August 2008	For actions during the Vietnam War.	He was awarded the decoration for his leadership and gallantry during the Battle of Long Tan in the Vietnam War. Smith was originally recommended for the Distinguished Service Order following the battle, but this was subsequently downgraded to the Military Cross. The award of the Star of Gallantry to Smith came as a result of several years of campaigning to the Australian Government resulting in an independent review which recommended the award.
S	Private	26 January 2010	For acts of conspicuous gallantry in action in circumstances of great peril while a lead scout in Afghanistan in 2008.	"Private S' gallantry ensured the safety of his team, neutralised the enemy and achieved mission success. Private S, as the lead scout of his team, was heavily engaged at close quarters with automatic fire and rocket propelled grenades by a well armed and determined insurgent force. He displayed complete disregard for his personal safety by moving to an exposed firing position in order to fire and throw grenades to suppress enemy within 30 metres of his position. His selfless act enabled the rest of his team to fire and manoeuvre to regain the initiative and neutralise the enemy. His efforts are in the finest traditions of the Australian Army and the Australian Defence Force."
S	Private	13 June 2011	For acts of conspicuous gallantry in action in circumstances of great peril with the Special Operations Task Group.	
