= Battle of Long Tan =

1966 battle of the Vietnam War

- Part of the Vietnam War
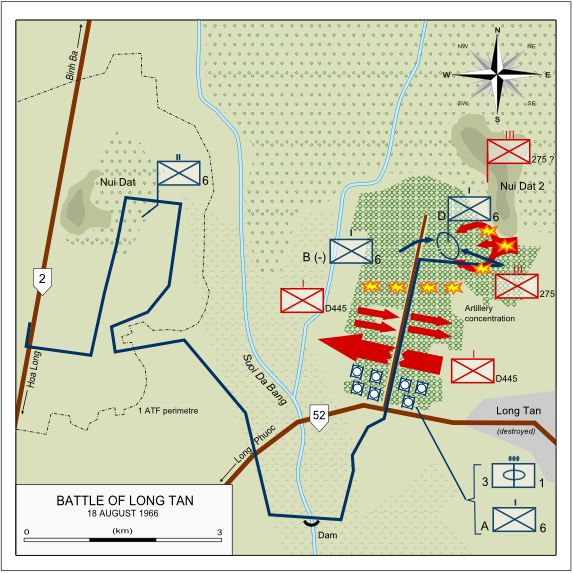
- Map illustrating the Battle of Long Tan on 18 August 1966
Date	18–21 August 1966
Location	Long Tân, Phước Tuy Province, South Vietnam 10°33′14″N 107°15′32″E
Result	See aftermath

Belligerents
Australia; New Zealand; United States	Viet Cong; North Vietnam

Commanders and leaders
Harry Smith (Australia) Oliver David Jackson	Nguyễn Thanh Hồng; Nguyễn Thới Bưng; Bui Quang Chanh

Units involved
1st Australian Task Force; D Company, 6 RAR; 1st Field Regiment, Royal Australian Artillery; Royal Regiment of New Zealand Artillery; 2/35th Artillery Battalion; Aerial Support	5th Division; 275th Regiment; D445 Battalion

Strength
D Company, 6 RAR: 108 men; Artillery support; multiple M113 and further infantry	Australian claim: 1,500 – 2,500 men VC/PAVN sources: 700 men

Casualties and losses
18 killed and 24 wounded	Initial Australian claim: 245 killed 350 wounded 3 captured VC/PAVN sources: 47 killed, 100 wounded

The Battle of Long Tan (18–21 August 1966) took place in a rubber plantation near Long Tân, in Phước Tuy Province, South Vietnam, during the Vietnam War. The action was fought between Viet Cong (VC) and People's Army of Vietnam (PAVN) units on one side and elements of the 1st Australian Task Force (1 ATF) on the other.

Australian signals intelligence (SIGINT) had tracked the VC 275th Regiment and D445 Battalion moving to a position just north of Long Tan. By 16 August, it was positioned near Long Tan outside the range of the one ATF artillery at Nui Dat. Using mortars and recoilless rifles (RCLs), on the night of 16–17 August, the VC attacked Nui Dat from a position 2 kilometres (1.2 mi) to the east, until counter-battery fire made it stop. The next morning D Company, 6th Battalion, Royal Australian Regiment (6 RAR), departed Nui Dat to locate the firing positions and determine the direction of the VC withdrawal. D Company found weapon pits and firing positions for mortars and RCLs, and around midday on 18 August made contact with VC elements.

Facing a larger force, D Company called in artillery support. Heavy fighting ensued as the VC attempted to encircle and destroy the Australians, who were resupplied several hours later by two UH-1B Iroquois from No. 9 Squadron RAAF. With the help of strong artillery fire, D Company held off a regimental assault before a relief force of M113 armoured personnel carriers and infantry from Nui Dat reinforced them that night. Australian forces then pulled back to evacuate their casualties and formed a defensive position; when they swept through the area next day, the VC had withdrawn and the operation ended on 21 August.

Although one ATF initially viewed Long Tan as a defeat, the action was later re-assessed as a strategic victory since it prevented the VC moving against Nui Dat. The VC also considered it a victory, due to the political success of an effective ambush and securing of the area around the village. Whether the battle impaired the capabilities of the VC is disputed.

== Background ==
The 1st Australian Task Force (1 ATF) began arriving in Phước Tuy Province of South Vietnam between April and June 1966. Following the establishment of its base at Nui Dat in Operation Hardihood, platoon patrols and ambushes were initially conducted out to Line Alpha (4,000 metres (4,400 yd)), which was the range of the Viet Cong (VC) mortars, but were later extended out to Line Bravo (10,000 metres (11,000 yd)) to counter the threat from artillery.

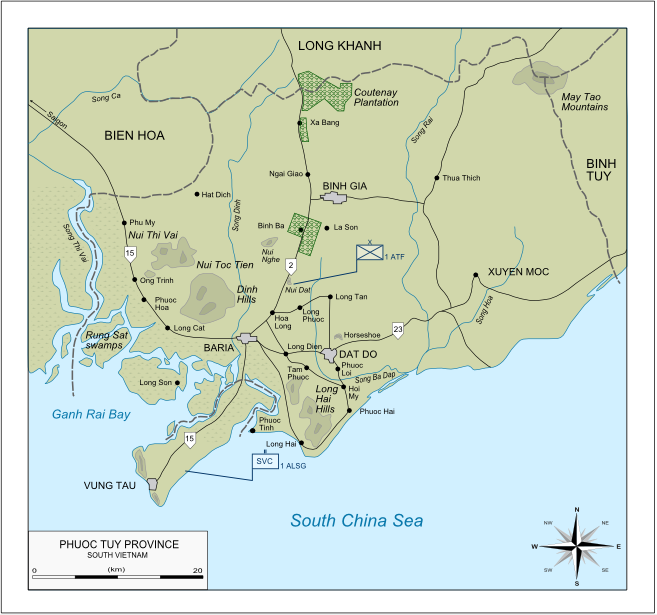
Phuoc Tuy Province, South Vietnam

All inhabitants of Long Phước and Long Hải villages within Line Alpha were resettled nearby. A protective security zone was established and a free-fire zone declared. Although unusual for allied installations in Vietnam, many of which were located near populated areas, the Australians hoped to deny the VC observation of Nui Dat, and afford greater security to patrols. While adding to the physical security of the base through disrupting a major VC support area and removing the local population from danger, such measures may have been counter-productive. The resettlement resulted in widespread resentment.

The VC continued to observe the base from the Nui Dinh hills. On 10 June reports indicated that a VC regiment was moving towards Nui Dat from the north west and was about 10 kilometres (6.2 mi) away. The same day three 120 mm mortar rounds landed just outside the base. That night Australian artillery fired on suspected movement along Route 2, but no casualties were found the next day. Further warnings of an attack hastened the call-forward of 6th Battalion, Royal Australian Regiment (6 RAR), which arrived from Vũng Tàu 30 kilometres (19 mi) to the south on 14 June. No attack occurred, and the initial reaction to 1 ATF's lodgement proved unexpectedly limited.

=== Opposing forces ===
==== Communist forces ====
The principal communist units in Phước Tuy were main forces from the 274th and 275th Regiments of the VC 5th Division. Under command of Senior Colonel Nguyen The Truyen, the division was headquartered in the Mây Tào Mountains. Operating in Phước Tuy, Biên Hòa and Long Khánh Provinces, it comprised both South Vietnamese VC guerrillas and North Vietnamese People's Army of Vietnam (PAVN) units. Given the task of isolating the eastern provinces from Saigon by interdicting the main roads and highways, including National Routes 1 and 15 and provincial routes 2 and 23, it proved a major challenge to Army of the Republic of Vietnam (ARVN) units that ventured into the province, demonstrating a capacity to mount regimental-size ambushes. The 274th Regiment was the stronger and better trained of the two. Based in the Hát Dịch in north west Phước Tuy with three battalions—D800, D265 and D308—it numbered 2,000 men. The 275th Regiment was based in the Mây Tào Mountains and mainly operated in the east of the province. Commanded by Senior Captain Nguyen Thoi Bung (aka Ut Thoi), it consisted of three battalions—H421, H422 and H421—with a total of 1,850 men.

In support was an artillery battalion equipped with 75 mm recoilless rifles (RCLs), 82 mm mortars, and 12.7 mm heavy machine-guns, an engineer battalion, a signals battalion and a sapper reconnaissance battalion, as well as medical and logistic units. Local forces included D445 Battalion, which normally operated in the south and in Long Khánh. Under command of Bui Quang Chanh (alias Sau Chanh), it consisted of three rifle companies—C1, C2, C3—and a weapons company, C4; a strength of 550 men. (Note: 1 ATF intelligence believed Sau Chanh commanded the battalion in August 1966; however, following interviews with former PAVN officers in 1988, the Australian official historian concluded Nguyen Van Kiem had done so. Yet according to the D445 Battalion history published in 1991 Chanh was in fact the unit's first commander, while Kiem commanded the Châu Đốc District Company during Long Tan and only took over the battalion in early 1968.) Recruited locally and operating in familiar terrain, they possessed an intimate knowledge of the area. Guerrilla forces numbered 400, operating in groups of five to 60, with two companies in Châu Đốc district, one in Long Dat, and a platoon in Xuyên Mộc. In total, VC strength was estimated to have been around 4,500 men.

==== Allied Forces ====
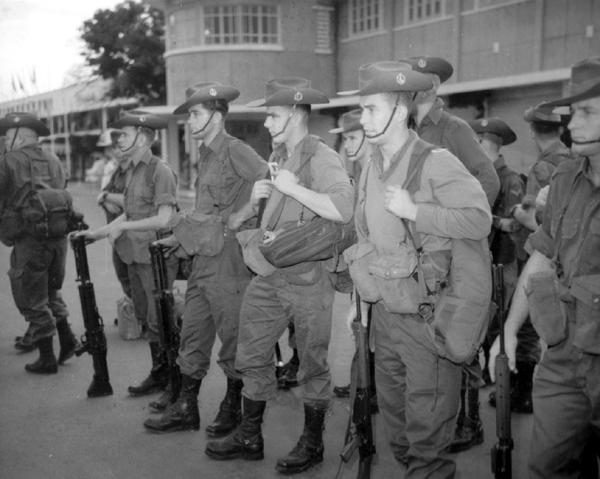
Australians arrive at Tan Son Nhut Airport, Saigon

ARVN forces included the 52nd Ranger Battalion, a unit that had previously earned a US Presidential Unit Citation defeating the 275th Regiment the year before, and relatively weak territorial forces of 17 Regional Force (RF) companies and 47 Popular Force (PF) platoons, in total some 4,500 men. Most villages were garrisoned by an RF company operating from a fortified compound, and PF platoons guarded most hamlets and important infrastructure, but their value was questionable. RF companies were technically available for tasks throughout the province, while PF platoons were mostly restricted to operating around their village. While RF and PF units occasionally defended themselves successfully they rarely conducted offensive operations, and when they did they were usually limited. Mostly recruited from the same population as their opponents, they often suffered equally at the hands of the VC and a largely inept government. Poorly trained and unable to rely on being reinforced, they provided little opposition to the VC. A US Advisory Team operated in support, as did a few Australians from the Australian Army Training Team Vietnam (AATTV); despite their efforts, the capabilities of the ARVN remained limited. The arrival of 1 ATF further restricted their ability to operate in Phước Tuy as it increasingly came to dominate the province.

Initially, 1 ATF, under the command of Brigadier Oliver David Jackson, consisted of two infantry battalions: the 5th Battalion, Royal Australian Regiment (5 RAR), commanded by Lieutenant Colonel John Warr, and 6 RAR under Lieutenant Colonel Colin Townsend. Other units included the 1st Armoured Personnel Carrier Squadron operating M113 armoured personnel carriers (APCs); 1st Field Regiment, Royal Australian Artillery, consisting of the New Zealand 161st Battery, two Australian batteries equipped with eighteen 105 mm L5 Pack Howitzers, and six 155 mm M109 self-propelled howitzers from the US A Battery, 2nd Battalion, 35th Artillery Regiment; 3rd SAS Squadron; 1st Field Squadron and 21st Engineer Support Troop; 103rd Signals Squadron; 161st Reconnaissance Flight operating Cessna 180s and Bell H-13 Sioux light observation helicopters; and an intelligence detachment. Support was provided by the 1st Australian Logistic Support Group (1 ALSG) at Vũng Tàu, and eight UH-1B Iroquois helicopters from No. 9 Squadron RAAF. US forces provided considerable support including artillery, close air support, helicopter gunships, and utility, medium and heavy lift helicopters. The largest Australian force deployed since the Second World War, it had been rapidly assembled. Although many of its officers and non-commissioned personnel had extensive operational experience, it included many National Servicemen. Few had direct experience of counter-insurgency operations, or first-hand understanding of the situation in Vietnam. The task force was unable to train together before departure.

=== Preliminary operations ===
With 1 ATF established at Nui Dat, subsequent operations included a search and destroy missions to gain control over Phước Tuy. Seeking to extend its influence beyond Line Alpha, in early July 5 RAR patrolled north through Nui Nghệ, while 6 RAR cleared Long Phước to the south, removing the former inhabitants who had returned since May. 5 RAR then began operations along Route 2, cordoning and searching Dục Mỹ on 19–20 July in preparation for the clearance of Bình Ba, while the SAS conducted long-range patrols to the edge of the Tactical Area of Operations (TAOR) to provide early warning of VC concentrations. With the 5th Division believed able to concentrate anywhere in Phước Tuy within 24 to 48 hours, it was a significant threat. As 1 ATF began to impact the VC's freedom of action, a response was expected. Mortar fire and small probes on the Nui Dat perimeter occurred, with such activity considered a possible prelude to an attack. Assessments of VC intentions changed from those of May and June. Whereas previously a full-scale assault was expected, as Nui Dat's defences were strengthened an attack against an isolated company or battalion was considered more likely. Other possibilities included skirmishes or ambushes during routine patrolling, or an attempt to interdict a resupply convoy from Vũng Tàu.

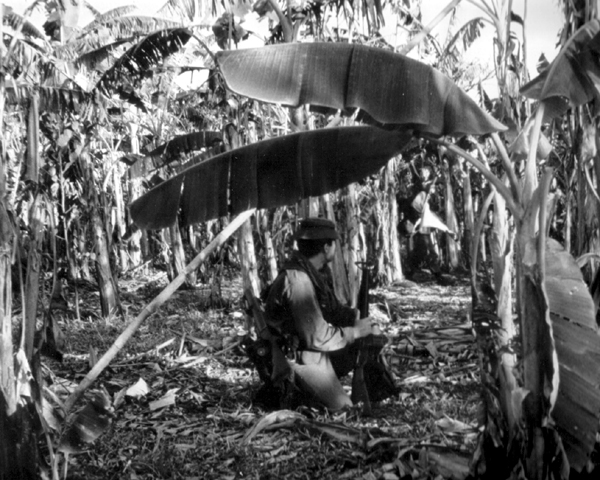
Australian soldier during operations in Phước Tuy Province

By the end of July, a large VC force had been detected by SAS patrols east of Nui Dat, near the abandoned village of Long Tân. In response, 6 RAR launched a battalion search and destroy operation. In a series of fire-fights on 25 July, a company from D445 Battalion attacked C Company, and in the process of retreating assaulted B Company occupying a blocking position. Over the following days, further clashes occurred around Long Tan, resulting in 13 VC killed and 19 wounded, and Australian losses of three killed and 19 wounded. Yet with the inhabitants resettled, the village fortified and the perimeter regularly patrolled, the Australians considered the area secure. Believing VC sympathisers had returned to Long Tân, they searched the area again on 29 July. That afternoon, as 6 RAR commenced a detailed search following its initial sweep, Jackson ordered its immediate return to Nui Dat in response to South Vietnamese reports of a large VC presence close to the base. Although the warnings were unconfirmed and an attack against Nui Dat was considered unlikely, 1 ATF was re-postured. Company patrols were sent out in each direction over the following days, but found little of significance. Jackson had seemed to over-react, and his requests for assistance from US II Field Force, Vietnam (II FFV) were denied. Later intelligence discredited the original reporting and the crisis subsided, but it was indicative of the alarms experienced during the first months of 1 ATF's lodgement, and their effect.

After two months, 1 ATF had moved beyond the initial requirements of establishing itself and securing its immediate approaches, and commenced operations to open the province. The task force had penetrated the VC base areas to the east and clashed with D445 Battalion. Operations had been conducted in the Núi Dinh hills to west, Bình Ba had been cleared of VC influence and Route 2 opened to civilian traffic. Yet the ongoing need to secure Nui Dat reduced the combat power available to the task force commander, and it was evident that with only two battalions—rather than the usual three—1 ATF lacked operational flexibility, as while one battalion carried out operations the other was required to secure the base and provide a ready reaction force. Significant logistic problems also plagued the task force, as 1 ALSG struggled to become operational amid the sand dunes at Vũng Tàu, resulting in shortages of vital equipment. By the middle of August, the Australian troops were growing tired from constant day and night patrolling with no respite from base defence duties. A rest and recreation program began, with many granted two days leave in Vũng Tàu, but this further stretched the limited forces available to 1 ATF. Meanwhile, in response to the growing threat posed by the Australians, the commander of the VC 5th Division finally ordered the 275th Regiment to move against Nui Dat.

Viet Cong soldiers from D445 Battalion

For several weeks, Australian signals intelligence (SIGINT) had used direction finding to track a VC radio transmitter from the headquarters of the 275th Regiment westwards to a position just north of Long Tân. Extensive patrolling failed to find the unit. The reports began on 29 July at the height of the false alarm, with the radio detected moving towards Nui Dat from a position north of Xuyên Mộc. The movement continued at a rate of 1 kilometre (0.62 mi) a day and by 13 August was located near the Nui Dat 2 feature, a hill in the vicinity of Long Tân, 5,000 metres (5,500 yd) east of Nui Dat. While direction finding indicated the movement of the radio, no actual communications had been intercepted. However it suggested the presence of the 275th Regiment or at least a reconnaissance party of that unit. Jackson could not rule out deception and therefore took the threat seriously when he decided to send company patrols out. The existence of a SIGINT capability was a closely guarded secret, and knowledge of the source of the reports was limited to Jackson, his two intelligence officers, and the 1 ATF operations officer; neither battalion commander had access. On 15 August D Company, 6 RAR patrolled to Nui Dat 2 and returned through the Long Tân rubber plantation. The following day A Company, 6 RAR departed on a three-day patrol on a route which included Nui Dat 2 and the ridge to the north west. Any sizeable VC force in the vicinity would have been located, but neither patrol found anything of significance. SAS patrols focused on the Núi Dinh hills to the west.

By 16 August, the VC force was positioned east of the Long Tân rubber plantation, just outside the range of the artillery at Nui Dat. The Australians thought that Colonel Nguyen Thanh Hong, a staff officer from the VC 5th Division who was likely in overall control, planned the operation. Although VC intentions have been debated in the years since, the aim was likely both a political and military victory to prove their strength to the local population, and undermine Australian public support for the war. They would probably have known one of 1 ATF's battalions was involved in the search of Bình Ba, and may have considered Nui Dat weakly defended as a result. Undetected, it likely consisted of three battalions of the 275th Regiment with approximately 1,400 men, possibly reinforced by at least one regular PAVN battalion, and D445 Battalion with up to 350 men. (Note: While McNeill states the 275th Regiment had been reinforced by at least one regular PAVN battalion, recent research suggests no such unit was present. The 275th Regiment was restructured in May 1966, incorporating the PAVN D605 Battalion as its third battalion (which had been disbanded).) Well armed, they were equipped with AK-47 and SKS assault rifles, RPG-2 rocket-propelled grenades, light machine guns, mortars and RCLs. Large quantities of ammunition were carried, with each man issued two or three grenades, and grenadiers up to ten or twelve, and a reserve of small arms, mortar bombs and rounds for their crew-served weapons. The 274th Regiment was probably located 15 to 20 kilometres (9.3 to 12.4 mi) north west, occupying a position on Route 2 to ambush a squadron of the US 11th Armored Cavalry Regiment, which they anticipated would move down the inter-provincial highway from Long Khánh to support the Australians.

== Battle ==
=== Opening moves, 17 August 1966 ===
==== Initial assault ====
At 02:43 on the morning of 17 August Nui Dat was bombarded by the VC, and was hit by over 100 rounds from a position 2 kilometres (1.2 mi) to the east. Most of the infantry were deployed at the time, while a small party remained at the base. The bombardment lasted for 22 minutes, damaging vehicles, tents and wounding 24 men, one of whom later died.

The impact was spread over the south and south-east. The 1st Field Regiment commenced counter-battery fire at 02:50. As the artillery locating radar was suspected of being faulty, the enemy firing position was located manually. With the likely location of the attackers plotted, 240 rounds were fired which made the bombardment cease. The Australians remained alert in case of a ground assault, but this did not occur. The Australian artillery continued to shell suspected VC firing positions and withdrawal routes until 04:10. Although the VC were expected to have withdrawn, several patrols were dispatched later in the morning to search the area east of Nui Dat.

==== Pursuing the Vietcong ====
Townsend ordered B Company under Major Noel Ford to prepare for a patrol to locate the firing points which were believed to be in the area between the abandoned villages of Long Tân, Long Phước, and the Nui Dat 2 feature. Having done so, it was to establish the direction of the VC withdrawal. Meanwhile, a platoon from C Company mounted in armoured personnel carriers was to investigate a suspected mortar location south-west of Nui Dat. A Company would continue its patrol in the vicinity of Nui Dat 2, while 7 Platoon, C Company, already conducting a night ambush on the southern edge of the TAOR, would search some sites as it returned that morning. No SAS patrols were deployed as a result of the attack, although several previously had been planned to the north between Bình Ba and the Courtenay plantation in preparation for upcoming operations went ahead. Another patrol was inserted near the Song Rai, 16 kilometres (9.9 mi) north-east of Nui Dat, on the morning of 17 August. The patrol located several tracks about six hours old and headed in a westerly direction that were possibly made by a VC logistics unit. Radio interference and faulty equipment meant that the company was unable to report the information until extraction two days later. Australian intelligence continued to assess a ground attack against Nui Dat as unlikely, with the bombardment an indicator of further offensive action against 1 ATF, Jackson felt he would be unable to adequately respond with only one battalion. 5 RAR was therefore ordered to return to Nui Dat, and was expected back by 18 August.

Although SIGINT had earlier alerted Jackson to the possible presence of a strong VC force in the vicinity of Nui Dat 2, patrols of the area revealed nothing, and as a consequence B Company did not expect to meet significant opposition. Stepping off early on 17 August with just 80 men—some due on leave the following day—they were significantly under-strength, lacking provisions. Crossing the Suối Da Bang creek, the firing point of the mortars was soon located, as were signs of the VC withdrawal. Meanwhile, A Company, 6 RAR under Captain Charles Mollison continued its patrol north of Nui Dat 2, and was involved in three minor clashes, killing one VC and wounding two. B Company was subsequently given the task of remaining in the area and searching to the north and east the following day, and was met by porters that afternoon to supply them with rations. 9 Platoon, C Company returned to Nui Dat with nothing to report, leaving A and B Company in their night locations. Speculation about the size of the VC in the area increased. Captain Bryan Wickens, the 6 RAR Intelligence Officer, assessed that the presence of medium mortars, RCLs and artillery likely indicated a significant force. Due to growing uncertainty about VC intentions, Jackson agreed the patrol scheduled for 18 August should be increased from platoon to company size. D Company, 6 RAR under command of Major Harry Smith had previously been detailed for a three-day patrol south-east of Nui Dat and was instead ordered to relieve B Company the next day to continue the search. Neither Townsend nor Smith were warned of the possible presence of the 275th Regiment.

=== Patrolling east of Nui Dat, 18 August 1966 ===
B Company were due to go on leave, and therefore returned to Nui Dat on the morning of the 18th. At 07:05 the depleted company—reduced to a single platoon and Company Headquarters—continued the search east as far as the edge of the rubber plantation, while A Company searched down the Suối Da Bang towards them. They located several weapon pits and the firing positions. At Nui Dat D Company, 6 RAR prepared for its patrol.Meanwhile, 5 RAR (minus one company) returned to Nui Dat.

==== Troop support and pursuit ====
D Company departed Nui Dat at 11:00 on 18 August led by Smith. They were accompanied by a three-man New Zealand artillery forward observer party under Captain Maurice Stanley, making up a 108-man company. Already behind schedule and with B Company having been out for longer than expected, Smith wanted to relieve Ford and then follow the VC tracks to continue the pursuit that afternoon.Despite the heat the company moved at a fast pace, traversing the low scrub, swamp and paddy fields as they closed in on B Company's position.

At 13:00 D Company met up with B Company on the edge of the Long Tân rubber plantation, approximately 2,500 metres (2,700 yd) from Nui Dat. D Company moved into all-round defence and posted sentries. While the soldiers had lunch, Smith and Ford inspected the area with a small protection party. The position appeared to have been used by the VC as a staging area prior to the bombardment two nights before, and there were signs that they had evacuated their casualties. The Australians found blood stains and equipment and they examined their firing locations. After briefing Smith, Ford and the remainder of B Company turned for Nui Dat. D Company subsequently took over the pursuit.

Smith decided to follow signs of a fresh track leading north-east. Setting off at 15:00, D Company paralleled a well-defined track running slightly uphill. Each platoon moved in open formation, with two sections forward in arrowhead and one back. Moving deeper into the plantation, After 200 metres (220 yd) the track divided into two which ran roughly east-south-east in parallel, 300 metres (330 yd) apart. At the junction, D Company found evidence of the VC mortars having been prepared, while more scattered equipment was found. Unable to cover both tracks, Smith radioed Townsend to discuss the situation. It was decided D Company would take the more easterly track.

=== Initial contact ===
==== First contact with Vietcong ====
D Company moved off again. Shortly after 11 Platoon's lead section crossed a dirt road running south-west to north-east. Straight, well-established and sunken with a clearing on either side, it was 20 to 30 metres (22 to 33 yd) wide and required them to complete an obstacle-crossing drill to traverse it. At 15:40, just as the forward sections entered the tree line on the other side, but before platoon headquarters could follow, a group of six to eight VC approached their right flank along the track from the south. Unaware of their presence, the VC squad continued into the middle of the platoon. One was hit in a brief action after the platoon sergeant, Sergeant Bob Buick, engaged them, while the remainder scattered. They rapidly moved south-east, and although the Australians believed it just another fleeting contact, artillery was called onto their likely withdrawal route 500 metres (550 yd) south. After pausing to reorganise, 11 Platoon moved into extended line, sweeping the area and recovering an AK-47 and the body of a VC soldier. Sharp reported to Smith that the VC had been dressed in khaki uniforms and were carrying automatic weapons, yet D445 Battalion soldiers typically wore black and were equipped with US-origin bolt-action rifles or carbines. At the time only main force units were so equipped, but the significance was not immediately apparent. With the area clear following the initial contact, Smith ordered D Company to continue the advance. Meanwhile, Second Lieutenant David Harris was at Headquarters 1 ATF at Nui Dat when the first reports came in. As Jackson's aide he was aware of the intelligence being received and believed D Company had clashed with a main force regiment. Harris alerted Jackson, before telephoning Major Bob Hagerty—officer commanding 1st APC Squadron—to warn him of the possible requirement for his standby troop.

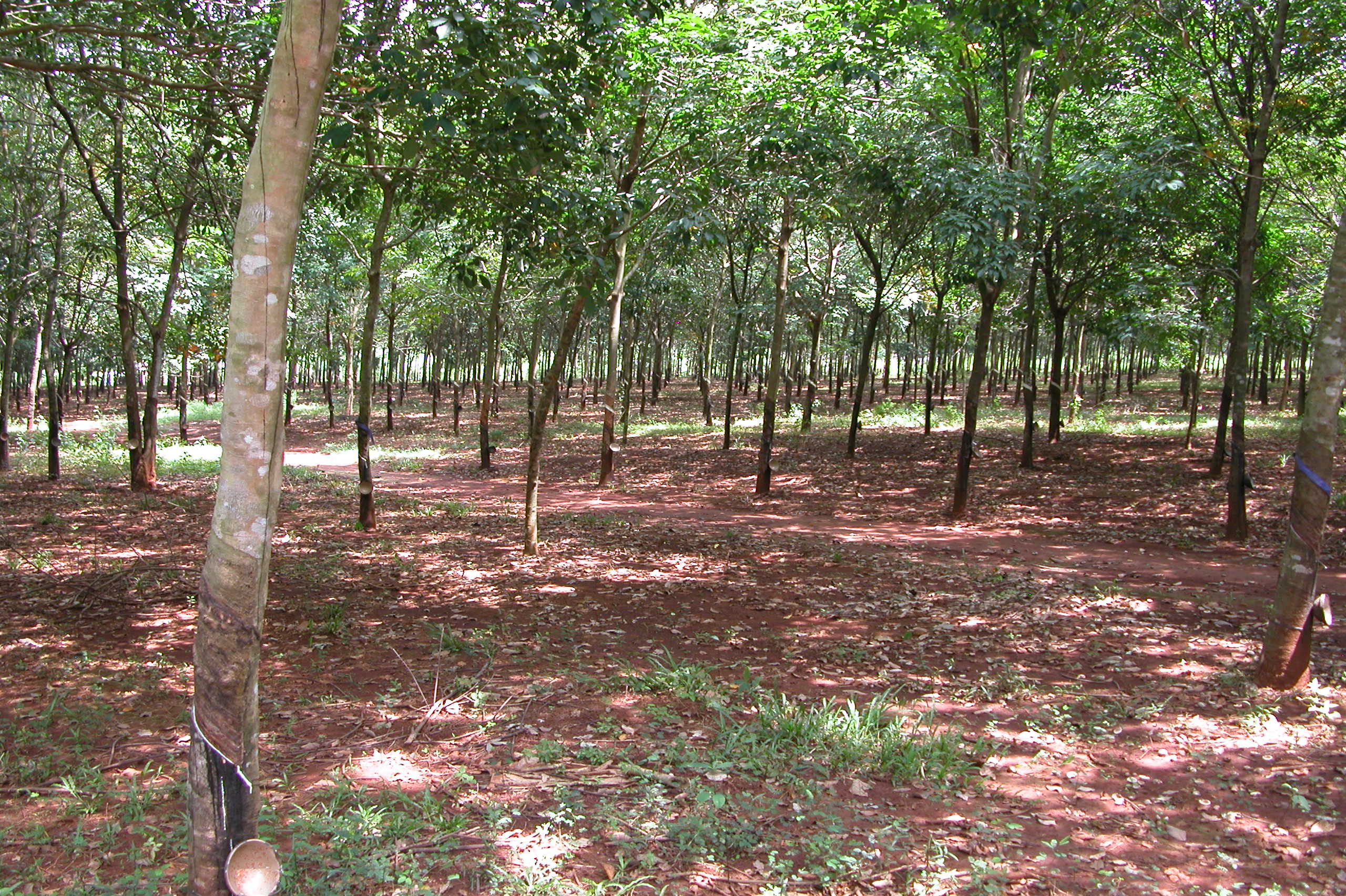
Site of the battle in 2005

Moving forward again, D Company continued east. 11 Platoon's rapid follow-up had opened a 500-metre (550 yd) gap with Company Headquarters, while the two lead platoons were also widely dispersed. 11 Platoon penetrated further into the plantation, widening the gap with 10 Platoon to more than 300 metres (330 yd). Although 12 Platoon in the rear covered most of the ground bypassed by the forward platoons, the gap was such that their flanking sections had lost sight of each other, while Smith was unable to see them in the dense vegetation. At that distance, the spacing between the Australians was now greater than the maximum effective range of their weapons. Meanwhile, 11 Platoon had moved forward approximately 250 metres (270 yd) from the first engagement. As Smith reached the site of the contact, the sound of firing continued to the front as Sharp manoeuvred his sections in pursuit of the withdrawing force. Still in extended line, 11 Platoon came across a rubber tapper's hut. Believing sounds coming from it were from VC hiding there, Sharp launched a platoon attack, but the VC had already fled, and the assaulting sections found only two grenades as they swept through the area. Advancing with three sections abreast—6 Section on the left, 4 Section in the centre and 5 Section on the right—they pushed on through the rubber towards a clearing. This formation allowed them to cover a broad front, but offered little flank security.

At 16:08, shortly after resuming the advance, 11 Platoon's left flank was engaged by machine-gun fire from a previously undetected VC force, killing and wounding several members of 6 Section. They went to ground and adopted firing positions, only to be engaged by a second machine-gun firing tracer. The firing lasted two to three minutes then stopped, and Sharp then ordered 5 Section to sweep across the front of the platoon from the right. Yet just as they began to move, they came under heavy small-arms and RPG fire from their front and both flanks. Pinned down by the weight of fire, and under threat of being overrun, the isolated platoon was forced to fight for their lives. Over the next 10 to 15 minutes the VC engaged 11 Platoon with heavy fire, putting their left flank out of action. At that moment a heavy monsoon rain began which reduced visibility to just 50 metres (55 yd) and turned the ground to mud. Assessing the VC to be in greater strength than previously thought and believing they were preparing to assault his position, Sharp called for artillery fire as he moved to bring his exposed section back into line and then gradually withdraw his platoon into all-round defence. He subsequently reported being under fire from a force estimated to be platoon-sized. The Australians had started the contact thinking they were numerically superior and would attack the VC, yet far from clashing with a small force which would try to withdraw before being decisively engaged, 11 Platoon had run into the forward troops of a main force regiment. Beginning as an encounter battle, heavy fighting ensued as the advancing battalions of the 275th Regiment and D445 Battalion clashed with D Company, 6 RAR and attempted to encircle and destroy them.

=== 11 Platoon isolated ===
Amid the noise of machine gun and rifle fire and the VC bugle calls, Stanley brought the 161st Battery, Royal New Zealand Artillery into action to support the Australian infantry. Yet as he was unable to see them, for safety reasons the initial rounds were directed a distance from 11 Platoon's known location, before "walking" the fire in to between 200 and 300 metres (220 and 330 yd) of their position, aided by D Company's favourable location between the VC and the gunline at Nui Dat, which allowed the rounds to pass over their heads and fall away from them. Landing beyond 11 Platoon, the rounds exploded amid the VC as they began to form up for an assault. But with 11 Platoon engaged from its left, front and right, it became clear the VC force was stronger than a platoon, and was probably at least company-sized. Supported by heavy machine-guns, they launched a series of assaults against 11 Platoon, only to be held off by small arms and artillery fire. As the fighting continued, Stanley realised a single artillery battery was insufficient, and at 16:19 requested a regimental fire mission using all 24 guns of the 1st Field Regiment. The VC continued their assault, surging around the flanks of 11 Platoon. The Australians responded with controlled small arms fire, picking off VC soldiers as the rain and artillery continued to fall. After making the required corrections, Stanley requested another regimental fire mission at 16:22, yet still unable to see the rounds land he had to work entirely from radio communications with 11 Platoon, adjusting the fire over an area of 200 metres (220 yd) using just a map.

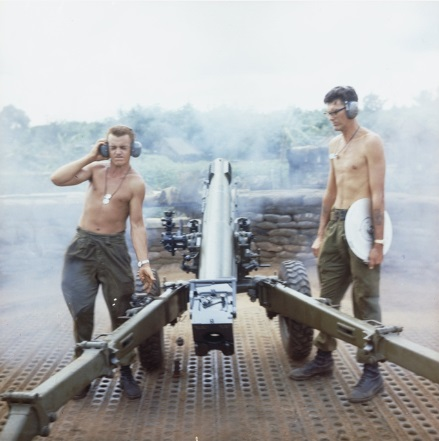
Two members of 103 Field Battery, Royal Australian Artillery, at Nui Dat in 1966 firing a 105mm L5 pack Howitzer

Less than 20 minutes after the first contact more than a third of 11 Platoon had been killed or wounded. Several 60mm light mortar rounds were fired towards the D Company position and although they landed to the east they further separated the remainder of the company from 11 Platoon, putting the main body behind a slight rise. At 16:26 Smith reported to Townsend that D Company was facing a force using mortars, and called for artillery support. Shortly afterwards Sharp was shot and killed after he raised himself to observe the fall of shot. With the platoon commander dead, Buick took charge of 11 Platoon, directing the artillery through Stanley. Unable to extricate itself, 11 Platoon was almost surrounded. Taking heavy casualties and running short of ammunition, Buick radioed for assistance. Soon after the aerial of the platoon's radio was shot away and communications lost. Meanwhile, Smith requested an air-strike to deal with the mortars. In response, Stanley organised counter-battery fire from the American 155 mm self-propelled howitzers at Nui Dat, which appeared to silence them.

Meanwhile, 10 Platoon was approximately 200 metres (220 yd) to the north and Smith ordered it to move up on the left of 11 Platoon to try to relieve pressure on them and allow a withdrawal back to the company defensive position. Dropping their packs, Kendall's platoon wheeled to the south-east in extended line, advancing towards 11 Platoon. As they came over a small rise, through the rain they observed a 30 to 40 strong VC platoon advancing south, firing on 11 Platoon as they attempted to outflank them. Advancing to close range before dropping to their knees to adopt firing positions, 10 Platoon engaged them from the rear, hitting a large number and breaking up the attack. As the surviving VC withdrew, Kendall pushed on. Yet shortly after 10 Platoon was engaged on three sides from a heavy machine-gun firing tracer from the high ground of the Nui Dat 2 feature 400 metres (440 yd) to their left, wounding the signaller and damaging the radio, putting it out of action. Now also without communications, and still 100 to 150 metres (110 to 160 yd) from 11 Platoon, 10 Platoon moved into a defensive position, fighting to hold on. Finally, a signaller (Private William "Yank" Akell) arrived from Company Headquarters with a replacement radio, having moved 200 to 300 metres (220 to 330 yd) through heavy fire as he tried to locate the platoon, killing two VC with his Owen gun on the way. With the wounded starting to arrive back at Smith's position and communications with 10 Platoon restored, he ordered Kendall to pull back under cover of the artillery. 10 Platoon was ultimately forced back to its start point.

=== Reaction at Nui Dat ===
It appeared the VC would shortly overrun D Company if they were not soon reinforced but no quick reaction force was prepared to deploy at short notice. Consequently, it took several hours to organise a relief force. Although essentially a sub-unit battle fought by a rifle company supported by artillery and co-ordinated by Townsend from the 6 RAR command post at Nui Dat, Jackson was concerned. Not only was D Company in trouble, but the entire force might be under threat. VC radio jamming on the battalion command net forced them to switch frequencies to communicate with D Company. Such a jamming capability was rarely found below divisional-level. Intending to lead the company out himself and take command of the battle, at 16:30 Townsend ordered A Company to prepare to reinforce them, despite themselves only having returned from a three-day patrol an hour prior, and 3 Troop, 1st APC Squadron under Lieutenant Adrian Roberts was warned to be ready to lift the relief force. US ground attack aircraft at Bien Hoa Air Base were also placed on alert by Headquarters 1 ATF. Meanwhile, on hearing the sounds of the fighting while returning to Nui Dat, B Company halted 2,300 metres (2,500 yd) short of the base and was ordered to rejoin D Company. Apparently under close observation by the VC, they were engaged by two 60 mm mortars as they turned around, but took no casualties.

Requiring the task force commander's permission to send out the relief force and to accompany it, Townsend telephoned Jackson. Concerned for the safety of the entire force, Jackson was initially reluctant to authorise its dispatch should it weaken the position at Nui Dat. Although he was unsure of the size of the VC facing D Company, from Smith's reports it appeared to be at least a regular battalion. Intelligence suggested it was likely from the 275th Regiment, although the location of its remaining two battalions were unknown, as was that of D445 Battalion. The whereabouts of the 274th Regiment was equally unclear. While radio direction finding suggested it may have been near Phước Tuy's northern border, three weeks earlier it had been reported close to the western side of the Australian TAOR, and one of its battalions had (incorrectly) been believed involved in an attack on Phú Mỹ in the south-west of the province on 11 August. Consequently, Jackson reasoned that if the battle unfolding near Long Tân was the opening phase of an attack on Nui Dat, the main assault was still to come, and he would need the bulk of his forces to defend the base. He considered the commitment of A Company would tie up the bulk of 6 RAR and the artillery. Yet Townsend believed Nui Dat's defences sufficient to deter such an attack, even if they remained incomplete, while the strategic reserve held by US II FFV could also be called upon if required. Ultimately Jackson gave in-principle support to the plan, but would not release the relief force until he thought it was warranted.

=== Fighting continues ===
By 16:50, it was apparent to Smith that he was facing a force of at least battalion-strength. Yet with his two forward platoons still separated and unable to support each other, D Company was badly positioned for a defensive battle. 10 Platoon had been prevented from engaging the VC attacking 11 Platoon, and was unable to support its withdrawal. Meanwhile, 11 Platoon had gone to ground in extended line following the initial contact, leaving its flanks vulnerable, while its aggressive push forward prior to the engagement also complicated the application of artillery support, which had to be switched to support each platoon as required rather than allowing it to be concentrated. Unable to see either platoon, the D Company forward observer was unsure of 11 Platoon's exact position. As a consequence 10 and 11 Platoons were each forced to fight their own battles, and despite the weight of the indirect fire increasingly becoming available to support the Australian infantry, the VC were able to apply superior firepower as they tried to isolate and attack each platoon in turn. To retrieve the situation, Smith planned to pull his company into an all-round defensive position, enabling his platoons to support each other fighting a co-ordinated battle and care for the wounded until a relief force could arrive. The VC moved to overrun the beleaguered force, but the dispersal of the Australian platoons made it difficult for them to find D Company's flanks and roll them up, and may have led the VC commander to believe he was engaging a much larger force.

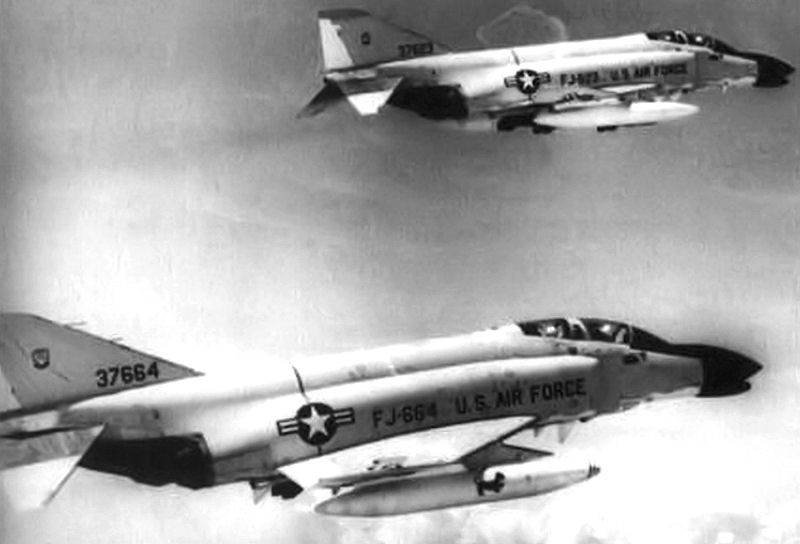
US F-4 Phantoms over South Vietnam

In the meantime, Buick repaired the 11 Platoon radio and re-established communications with company headquarters, and with Stanley, who was again able to adjust the artillery by radio. The VC succeeded in closing to within 50 metres (55 yd) of 11 Platoon's position, and much of the artillery was beginning to fall behind them. Although the fire was probably impacting the VC rear area and causing casualties there, these assault troops had deliberately closed with the Australians to negate its effect. Buick estimated 11 Platoon was being assaulted by at least two companies; down to the last of their ammunition and with just 10 of its 28 present still able to fight, he feared they would soon be overrun, and were unlikely to survive beyond the next 10 to 15 minutes. Confident the rest of D Company would be attempting to reach them, but unable to see how that might occur, Buick requested artillery fire onto his own position despite the danger this entailed. Stanley refused, but after confirming 11 Platoon's precarious situation, he was able to walk the artillery in closer. Landing 50 to 100 metres (160 to 330 ft) to their front, the artillery detonated among a large concentration of VC troops, destroying an entire assault line as they formed up. At 17:00, three US F-4 Phantoms arrived on station for an airstrike arranged by battalion headquarters.

==== Ammunition shortage and urgent request for support of D Company ====
At 17:02, Smith reported D Company was running low on ammunition and required aerial resupply. With just three magazines carried by each rifleman, they were only lightly equipped prior to the battle. This was a standard load calculated on 1 RAR usage rates which had been enough during previous actions, but it proved insufficient for sustained fighting. Due to the thick vegetation, the ammunition boxes would need to be dropped through the trees, and intending on moving his headquarters behind a low knoll, Smith nominated a point 400 metres (440 yd) west. This position would afford greater protection, while the helicopters would be less likely to attract ground fire. Yet with their casualties now unable to be moved, D Company would have to remain where it was. Townsend passed the ammunition demand to Headquarters 1 ATF. In response, Jackson requested two UH-1B Iroquois from No. 9 Squadron RAAF to deliver it; however, the senior RAAF officer at Nui Dat, Group Captain Peter Raw, was not prepared to risk aircraft hovering at tree-top height in the heavy rain where they would be exposed to ground fire, citing Department of Air regulations. Relations between the Army and RAAF over the use of the helicopters had become increasingly bitter in the preceding months, and were still tenuous despite recent improvements. Jackson requested American assistance, and when the US Army liaison officer responded more favourably, Raw felt no alternative than to accede to the original request, offering to effect the resupply instead. By coincidence, two RAAF Iroquois were available at Nui Dat, having been used for the concert.

Smith called for the waiting aircraft to drop napalm across 11 Platoon's eastern frontage. The Phantoms soon arrived, but the rain and low cloud obscured the coloured smoke the Australians had thrown to mark their position through the trees. Stanley was forced to halt the artillery while the aircraft flew overhead, but as Smith was unable to establish communications with the forward air observer he wanted the aircraft to move out of the area so it could resume firing. Townsend directed the aircraft to attack the forward slopes of Nui Dat 2 instead, believing the VC command element to be located there. The artillery fire recommenced as the VC formed assault waves. Major Harry Honnor—officer commanding 161st Battery, RNZA attached to 6 RAR in direct support—served as Townsend's artillery advisor at Nui Dat and during the battle controlled the fires of the three field batteries and the American medium artillery. Stanley called down the fire or relayed the direction of the assault, from which Honnor selected targets and ordered the fire, which was then adjusted by Stanley using sound ranging to bring it closer. Although the rain and the soft ground reducing the impact of the artillery, its effectiveness was aided by otherwise favourable conditions: the location of the infantry between the guns and the assaulting VC, the convenient range of 5,000 to 6,000 metres (5,500 to 6,600 yd) at which the engagement occurred, good communications afforded by the newly issued AN/PRC-25 radios, the air burst effect created by rounds exploding in the trees, and the large supply of rounds stock-piled at Nui Dat.

=== 12 Platoon attempts to link up with Buick ===
Having been repulsed on the left, Smith tried the right flank. Pushing his headquarters forward, he ordered Sabben to move 12 Platoon—until then held in reserve—to support 11 Platoon. As new radio traffic was received, Smith was again forced to ground to work on fresh orders, while the arrival of casualties required the establishment of an aid post in the dead ground, which effectively tied them in location and prevented further manoeuvre. After more than an hour of fighting, D Company was still widely dispersed; 10 Platoon had been unable to break through to 11 Platoon from the north, and there remained only a slight chance 12 Platoon would have more success from the north-west. With the VC enjoying a considerable numerical advantage, Smith feared his platoons would be defeated in detail and that it was only a matter of time before his entire company was overrun, despite the devastating effect of the artillery on the VC assault formations. 12 Platoon departed at 17:15, moving south-east in an attempt to retrieve the now cut-off 11 Platoon, but having been forced to leave 9 Section behind to protect Company Headquarters and support the wounded, with just two sections it was significantly under-strength. Smith requested an airmobile assault to reinforce his position, but due to the bad weather, poor visibility and lack of a suitable landing zone this was considered impossible. Instead, Townsend informed him an infantry company mounted in APCs would be dispatched as a relief force.

At 17:05 Roberts had arrived at the 6 RAR headquarters at Nui Dat with his troop of 10 APCs, and was briefed by the Operations Officer on the situation before departing to pick up A Company from their lines. Yet Jackson was reluctant to reduce the defences at Nui Dat, considering the attack a possible feint. Consequently, although Smith repeatedly pressed Townsend, there was a delay of more than an hour from when the relief force was ordered to ready themselves until Roberts was allowed to move. (Note: McGibbon states Jackson hesitated to release the relief force because it would have left only C Company, 6 RAR to defend Nui Dat as 5 RAR had still not returned from Bình Ba. However, 5 RAR had been ordered to return the day prior and arrived just after D Company, 6 RAR departed on the morning of 18 August, although one company remained at Bình Ba.) Townsend finally ordered the relief force to move at 17:30, having received Jackson's approval. A Company, 6 RAR and 3 Troop were on standby in the company lines and departed fifteen minutes later. With the route largely dictated by the terrain, the possibility of the relief force being ambushed concerned Townsend and Jackson, but given the dire situation, they saw no alternative, and considered it unlikely, given the ground had been covered by frequent patrols, the proximity of D Company's position to Nui Dat, the open country between the base and rubber plantation, and that it was not yet dark. With 5 RAR back at Nui Dat, Jackson ordered it to take over the defensive positions normally occupied by 6 RAR, while deploying a platoon to the 1st APC Squadron lines, and placing D Company, 5 RAR on one hour's notice to move if required. The remainder of the battalion prepared to repel any attack on Nui Dat or to pursue the VC if they withdrew.

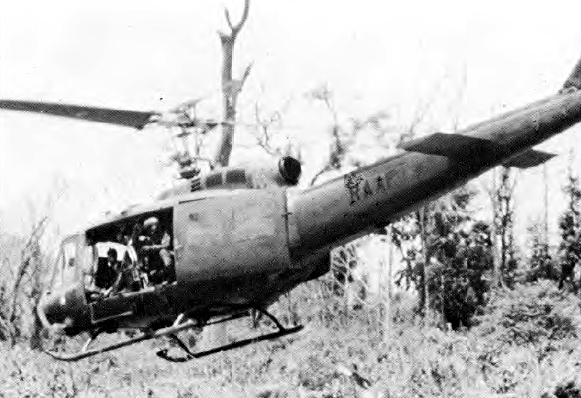
No. 9 Squadron RAAF Iroquois in Vietnam

Meanwhile, after departing D Company's position, the two sections from 12 Platoon moved south towards the sound of firing heard approximately 400 metres (440 yd) away. Unaware of the exact position of 11 Platoon, Sabben instead located the rubber tapper's hut previously assaulted by Sharp in the opening phases of the battle. As they advanced, they were forced to fight off an attack on their right flank, before eventually pushing forward another 100 metres (110 yd). By this time, the VC had succeeded in pushing behind 11 Platoon in an effort to outflank them, and a large force clashed with 12 Platoon as they attempted to come to their aid. Advancing from the north, two VC platoons then assaulted the Australians, who were now heavily engaged from three directions. Meeting a similar fate to 10 Platoon, Sabben's group was forced to ground 150 metres (160 yd) short of their objective, and were themselves in danger of being encircled. Sustaining increasing casualties, they clashed with several groups of VC trying to move around their western flank to get between 11 and 12 Platoon and form a cut-off force prior to mounting a frontal assault. In so doing, 12 Platoon succeeded in opening a path to 11 Platoon, yet after 45 minutes under fire Sabben was unable to advance any further, and with the rain reducing visibility to just 70 metres (77 yd) he was unsure of Buick's location.

At 18:00 two RAAF UH-1B Iroquois piloted by Flight Lieutenants Cliff Dohle and Frank Riley arrived over D Company's location with the ammunition resupply, and guided by red smoke thrown by the infantry, they hovered in the heavy rain just above the rubber trees near a small clearing. Because they were to be dropped from some height, the wooden outer crates were wrapped in blankets for the wounded. Aboard the helicopters the 6 RAR Regimental Sergeant Major, Warrant Officer Class One George Chinn, Private Bob Service of RAAOC and the Administration Company commander, Major Owen O'Brien, pushed the crates out to the soldiers waiting below, many of whom were now very low on ammunition. The boxes landed in the centre of the position and the RAAF pilots were later praised for their skill and daring. Without tools to cut the metal straps on the crates, the infantry had to smash them open using machetes or the butts of their rifles. Under heavy fire, the Company Sergeant Major (CSM) Warrant Officer Class 2 (WO2) Jack Kirby, and Sergeant Neill Rankin, the 12 Platoon sergeant, began to distribute the ammunition. However, while the machine-gun rounds were pre-loaded in belts, the rifle rounds were still in bandoliers, complicating Kirby's job and forcing the soldiers to reload their own magazines as they struggled to keep the ammunition clean in the mud and rain. The resupply renewed the situation for D Company. Prior to its arrival they had been down to their last 100 rounds, but now the Australians resumed firing, forcing the VC back for a third time.

=== D Company regroups ===
Despite being exposed to heavy fire from three sides, 11 Platoon had maintained its position for over two hours, narrowly holding off the VC with small arms fire and massive artillery support. However, many of the platoon had been killed or wounded, and most of the survivors were now out of ammunition. To their rear Sabben threw yellow smoke in the hope it would be seen through the trees by the beleaguered platoon. Finally, with the close artillery fire causing heavy casualties among the assaulting VC, Buick decided to take advantage of a temporary lull in the fighting to achieve a clean break. Intending to withdraw 100 to 150 metres (110 to 160 yd) west to regroup, on his signal the platoon rose to their feet. One of the Australians was immediately shot and killed as he did so, while two more were wounded before they reached a position of temporary safety. From this location Buick could see yellow smoke 75 to 100 metres (82 to 109 yd) away, and believing it to be Smith's headquarters, 11 Platoon moved towards it in what Buick described as a "mad scramble" in his autobiography, calling out to identify themselves as they approached. Locating 12 Platoon instead, but still finding themselves heavily engaged, the two platoons then moved back to the company position covered by the artillery and torrential rain. By 18:10 D Company had reformed, and the VC appeared to have momentarily broken contact. Having concentrated his company, Smith began to re-organise it into a position of all-round defence.

Smith attempted to place his depleted platoons into a defensible position, but D Company's location had been dictated by the actions of the VC and the need to care for the wounded, and as a result they had little choice of where to make their stand. However, with the Australians occupying a shallow fold in the ground on a reverse slope the terrain proved decisive. The VC found it difficult to use their heavy calibre weapons effectively and could only engage at close range. The jungle covered Nui Dat 2 feature lay 1,000 metres (1,100 yd) to the north-east, and an impenetrable wall of thick bamboo and scrub abutted the lower slopes to the west. The remainder of the position faced the relatively open rubber plantation. Believing the northern approach unsuitable for a major assault, Smith assessed the most likely VC courses of action to be a frontal assault from the east, or a flanking attack from either the south or south-west. As a consequence, he placed 10 and 12 Platoons in positions on the southern and eastern flanks, while the badly mauled 11 Platoon was allocated a position to the north-west. Company Headquarters was located in the south-west. During the lull, Smith walked around the position to gain an understanding of the situation and check the wounded. With one platoon almost destroyed, and the other two at approximately 75 per cent strength, D Company had been battered but morale remained high. Kirby completed the distribution of ammunition and Stanley plotted new defensive fire tasks for the artillery.

The respite proved brief as the VC soon located the Australian position. At 18:20 they re-engaged D Company with concentrated machine-gun fire from the east and south-east as they reorganised for a further attack. Movement was soon detected through the trees; however, at a distance of 150 to 200 metres (160 to 220 yd) the Australians thought they may have been B Company, and only engaged the VC as they moved out of range to the north. By following up the withdrawal of 12 Platoon and conducting probes, the attackers succeeded in confirming D Company's position. A company-sized VC force formed up to the south on a broad frontage which threatened to engulf them. The assault commenced at 18:35, with several bugle blasts marking the beginning of a series of attacks against D Company. Well spaced, the assault force stepped off at a fast walk supported by a company in reserve which moved 90 metres (98 yd) to their rear. Yet as they did so an accurate barrage from the Australian artillery fell among them, effectively destroying the rear echelon. The assault force continued on, only to be engaged with small arms just 50 metres (55 yd) from the forward Australian positions. Lacking any reserve, the assault was halted, although many unwounded attackers attempted to crawl around the D Company perimeter, and snipers fired from the trees.

A second assault soon advanced over the same ground, only to again be hit by artillery, with those unscathed going to ground among the dead and wounded. As they moved forward, they were joined by survivors of the first assault and together attempted to roll over the Australians. The VC then tried to site another heavy machine gun 50 metres (55 yd) from the D Company perimeter, but Kirby killed the crew. Despite the casualties, attacks continued, supported by machine guns. The main attacks came from the east, south-east and south, falling on 10 and 12 Platoons, with smaller ones elsewhere. However, due to the slope of the ground, much of the fire passed over the heads of the defenders. The slope likewise screened the advancing VC, preventing either side from effectively firing on the other until the VC closed within 50 metres, but few survived the artillery fire to get that close. Meanwhile, the VC had set up a light and a heavy machine gun on the forward slopes of Nui Dat 2 and these continued to engage the Australians. While they were able to achieve plunging fire from this vantage point, they were unable to observe D Company's position through the rubber trees and so were reduced to sweeping a broad area. Australian casualties included four killed and several wounded during this period, the majority from head and chest wounds.

=== A Company and 3 Troop fight through ===
By 18:45, D Company had succeeded in moving into an all-round defensive position, throwing back heavy attacks With D Company unable to manoeuvre, the initiative lay with the VC, the 1 ATF's artillery holding them at bay, with the main role of the infantry increasingly becoming one of protecting their forward observer. Stanley's efforts remained crucial to the survival of D Company, with the ability to strike artillery more precisely in closer combat. The close fire devastated the VC ranks, however a mistake led to the wounding of a member of D Company. Nonetheless, D Company was heavily outnumbered, unlikely to survive another assault; a simultaneous attack would completely overrun them. The battle's outcome rested on whether they could keep the VC at bay long enough for reinforcements. A fresh force was observed moving to the west, likely an attempt to encircle and cut off D Company.

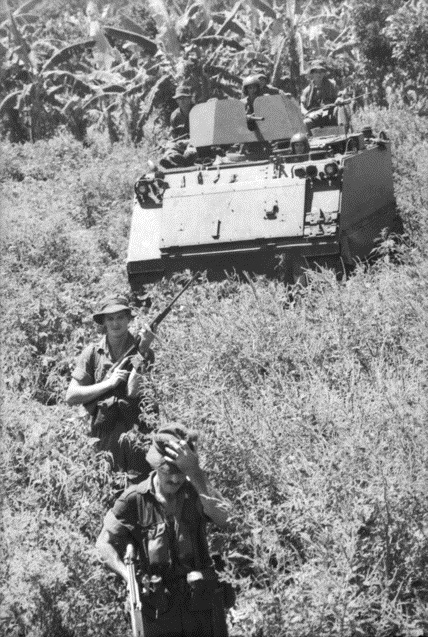
M113 similar to those used at Long Tan

==== Initial delays of the relief force ====
The relief force had been delayed by several factors, including flooding from the heavy rain, VC action, poor equipment, limited communications and an ambiguous command relationship between the armour and infantry. 3 Troop was exceedingly exposed, with their APC strength reduced from 13 to seven, with the remainder undergoing maintenance, many of the remainder marred with mechanical errors. In an attempt to supplement their APCs, three vehicles from 2 Troop, devoid of gun shields, were used, leaving the crew commander exposed. Mounted in the carriers, the 100-strong A Company (6 RAR) departed Nui Dat ordered to relieve pressure on D Company by attacking from the south and then to reinforce them and secure the area to allow the evacuation of the wounded. With few gaps in the Nui Dat perimeter wide enough for the APCs, a longer route was taken, and a diverted exit led to further delays until an alternative was located. At 17:55, after finally clearing the wire, Roberts was ordered to send two APCs back for Townsend and to wait until he came up, as he intended to accompany the carriers rather than move by helicopter. Detaching two APCs, Roberts ignored the second part of the order and the remainder of the troop proceeded, leaving Nui Dat at 18:00.

As the rain began, Roberts moved along the edge of the rubber plantation north-east of Long Phước in column towards the heavily swollen Suối Da Bang. The terracing of the paddy fields resulted in a steep drop to the creek and a difficult climb out; however, using a bullock track alongside a dam, Roberts swam the carriers across the water, despite the threat of fast-flowing water. At 18:10, Roberts was ordered for a second time to halt and wait for Townsend. Continuing to monitor D Company's situation over the radio, he again chose to disregard the order. After crossing without incident, Roberts left one carrier and its infantry to secure the point (and to act as a guide for Townsend), while the remaining seven APCs moved towards the battle. Advancing another kilometre, by 18:20 they reached the junction leading directly to the fighting; using it as his centre axis, Roberts deployed one section of three APCs on the right commanded by Sergeant Ron Richards and one on the left under Sergeant Leslie O'Reilly, each with two vehicles forward and one back evenly spaced approximately 40m apart, while he remained in the centre moving astride the road. They rapidly began to advance on a 300m frontage. Despite being again ordered to wait by Townsend, Roberts once more decided to press on.

==== Battle with D445 Battalion and further small battles ====
The relief force moved into the plantation in open formation, unaware of the location of D Company or the VC. With visibility limited by the low vegetation of the young rubber trees and the heavy rain, they suddenly encountered a company moving west in arrowhead dressed in greens, cloth hats and webbing. Realising they were VC attempting to outflank D Company, Lieutenant Peter Dinham ordered the crew commander to engage.

The rain had masked their approach and the VC (D445 Battalion), initially caught by surprise, returned fire. Dinham ordered the rear door open and the remainder of the Australians in the APC—consisting of platoon headquarters and one section—disembarked to protect him. Moving into extended line, they advanced, engaging the VC and causing heavy casualties. The spontaneous assault caught them by surprise, adding to their growing disorder. All serving to delay the relief force. After re-embarking the infantry, 3 Troop resumed the advance, breaking into the VC force as it streamed west, firing their .50 calibre machine guns and small arms. D445 Battalion was forced to withdraw east, having lost an estimated 40 killed, while one Australian was wounded.

3 Troop continued forward in assault formation, moving deeper into the plantation, with improved visibility allowing them to increase speed. By 18:30. B Company was also drawing near on foot, and observed the VC moving around the western flank, likely to escape the APCs. Shortly after, they were accidentally engaged by the APCs and lost one man wounded. After moving a further 200m, the relief force came out of the tree-line and were confronted by groups of 8 to 10 VC moving east, in total about 100 men, believed to be the lead elements of the force that had just been struck, now withdrawing after abandoning its attempt to outflank D Company. The APCs opened fire, engaging their flank with heavy machine guns. A number were hit while others turned to engage the APCs as it closed with them. A 57 mm RCL then fired on one of the APCs at close range with the round narrowly missing and blowing apart a tree which fell across the vehicle. The crew commander, Corporal John Carter, engaged the anti-armour team from the top of the APC as they reloaded, but his .50 calibre machine gun jammed as they fired again, and he killed two of them with his Owen gun from just 15 to 20 metres (16 to 22 yd). The second RCL round subsequently detonated against the fallen tree, saving both the vehicle and its occupants. Despite being dazed, Carter killed three more VC soldiers as he scrambled back into the carrier, which was now without communications following the destruction of its aerial. By drawing further fire he allowed the remainder of the troop to advance.

The potential presence of a second RCL team sited in mutual support forced the APCs to halt, once again. Concerned about the danger of bypassing an anti-armour weapon only to be engaged from the rear, Roberts ordered the troop to scan the area. Frustrated by the delay, Mollison demanded Roberts continue the advance, and an argument broke out between the two. As commander of the APCs, Roberts ignored the senior ranking Mollison, refusing to continue until he either located the weapon or was confident the threat did not exist. After a five-minute delay, with no weapon located, the Australians moved off again. A machine gun engaged three APCs without gun shields. Under heavy fire, the troop sergeant ran between the carriers to take command of the APC, after Roberts ordered him to return to Nui Dat due to the mistaken belief some of the infantry on board had also been wounded. Despite Mollison's objections, the vehicle departed, taking the headquarters of one of the infantry platoons with it. Still uncertain of the location of D Company, Roberts was forced to closely control the fire of the troop due to the concern any survivors might be hit by overshoots from the armoured vehicle's heavy machine guns. At the same time, the infantry continued to engage from the rear of the vehicles. A further 45 VC were estimated to have been killed during this action.

=== D Company reinforced ===
Unaware of the hold up on the left flank, the right hand section of APCs continued to advance. Pressing on, the section moved through the friendly artillery fire targeting the D445 Battalion as it had attempted to outflank D Company. As they moved closer to D Company the carriers were engaged by small arms and RPGs, continuing through and returning fire. The arrival of the carriers inspired the surviving members of D Company to stand and cheer. At the same time, Dinham's platoon dug in at the Eastern flank of D Company, awaiting the arrival of the remainder of A Company. To the west Roberts and the three remaining carriers of 3 Troop had resumed the advance and linked up with Richards at a junction in the road 300 metres (330 yd) south-west of D Company. Townsend arrived with elements of his headquarters aboard three more M113s at 18:50. Following a number of uncoordinated manoeuvres by the APCs Townsend took command, and with the light failing he ordered Roberts to assault from the west into the flank of the main VC force.

==== Arrival of the APCs and turning tide of the battle ====
Bolstered to nine M113s, 3 Troop again moved forward through the artillery fire with Roberts spreading the additional APCs across the rear of his formation for depth. Utilising a track as a guide he reformed the troop into a wide assault formation. Beginning the advance at 18:55, 3 Troop prepared for a frontal assault on the VC force. Continuing past D Company to their left, the APCs moved forward rapidly, firing their machine-guns. A brief but heavy engagement occurred, with the VC responding with automatic fire, including tracer and explosive rounds, mostly missing. Arriving at a crucial point in the fighting, the APCs turned the tide of the battle. The VC had been massing for another assault which would likely have destroyed D Company, yet the additional firepower and mobility of the APCs broke their will to fight, forcing them to break contact and begin to withdraw as night approached. At 19:00 the 32-strong group from B Company finally entered D Company's position, even as the APCs continued to assault the VC. After a long approach under mortar fire and the threat of ambush by a superior force, Smith placed Ford on the western side of the D Company defensive position to act as a screen to allow them to treat their wounded and prepare to resist a counter-attack. 3 Troop swept forward with the APCs continuing to assault a further 500 metres (550 yd) before Townsend ordered their return. Turning north-west, Roberts moved back to the company location at 19:10. Yet even as they did so the VC continued to attack from the north-east, although this too was soon broken off.

Linking up with D Company, the APCs moved through the company position. Around the perimeter the Australians engaged the withdrawing VC, while the APCs moved into a line from north to south on the eastern side of the company position. A Company disembarked and took up firing positions between the vehicles, joining 2 Platoon. The artillery had been almost constant throughout the battle and had prevented D Company from being destroyed. By 19:15 the firing had ceased and as darkness fell they prepared for the VC to mount another attack. Although snipers continued to engage the Australians there were no further assaults and the battle came to a conclusion. The APCs formed a hollow square around D Company. With the VC at least temporarily driven off, the Australian position was now more strongly held and additional ammunition had been brought in by the APCs, but it was now dark and they would be unable to receive further reinforcement, while the ability of the VC to mount a night attack was unknown. Meanwhile, the expenditure of artillery ammunition had been high and an urgent demand for 1,000 rounds was submitted by 1st Field Regiment, RAA at 19:30 in case the fighting continued. However, with arrangements for the emergency aerial resupply of Nui Dat by night still being worked out, and with a road resupply by 1 ALSG in danger of being ambushed, it took several hours for the rounds to be loaded and delivered by CH-47 Chinooks from Vũng Tàu.

==== Townsend assuming command of D Company ====
Townsend assumed command as the defenders regrouped, while Kirby co-ordinated the collection of the dead and wounded. In total, one of the platoons had been destroyed and D Company was "non-effective", with five dead, 16 wounded and 16 missing. VC losses were believed to have been heavy; but with no confirmed casualty figures it looked to the Australians like they had suffered a defeat. The two officers agreed it would be impossible to secure the battlefield or to attempt to locate the missing from 11 Platoon in the darkness, and after it became clear the VC were not going to counter-attack, Townsend ordered a withdrawal to a position 750 metres (820 yd) to the west from whence their casualties could be evacuated. Handling the dead and wounded proved a slow process but with the casualties finally loaded onto the carriers D Company left at 22:45, while B and A Companies departed on foot 45 minutes later. Roberts established a landing zone by forming a square and illuminated it with the interior lights of the APCs by opening their top hatches. The artillery fire ceased as the evacuation commenced with the first casualties taken out by a US Army Dustoff helicopter, while the remainder were extracted by six UH-1Bs from No. 9 Squadron RAAF. Despite being slowed by the requirement for the helicopters to land without lights, the operation went smoothly and was completed after midnight. The last casualties were taken out by 00:34, and flown to the Australian hospital at Vũng Tàu.

During the night the artillery continued to fire on likely VC forming-up points, although 11 Platoon's final position was avoided for fear of hitting any survivors, while US aircraft bombed likely withdrawal routes to the east. Forming a defensive position ready to repulse an expected attack the Australians remained overnight, enduring the cold and heavy rain. Although they were now in a better position to hold off an attack, further reinforcement from 1 ATF at night was difficult and was therefore unlikely. Yet with the VC spent no further attack was mounted. Smith and Townsend spent the night in the back of one of the carriers planning the clearance of the battlefield and pursuit of the VC, which was scheduled for the following day under the codename Operation Smithfield. Jackson stipulated the force was to remain within artillery range, but would otherwise have freedom of action to complete the exploitation over the next two to three days. Townsend requested the remaining APCs bring out 6 RAR headquarters, C Company and a section of mortars the following morning, while D Company, 5 RAR would also be placed under his command for the operation. However, with a company from 5 RAR still in Bình Ba, the bulk of 1 ATF's remaining combat power would be deployed as part of the clearance, leaving just two companies from 5 RAR to defend Nui Dat. Smith was determined to recover the missing from 11 Platoon, and despite its losses, D Company would lead the assault.

=== Clearing the battlefield, 19–21 August 1966 ===
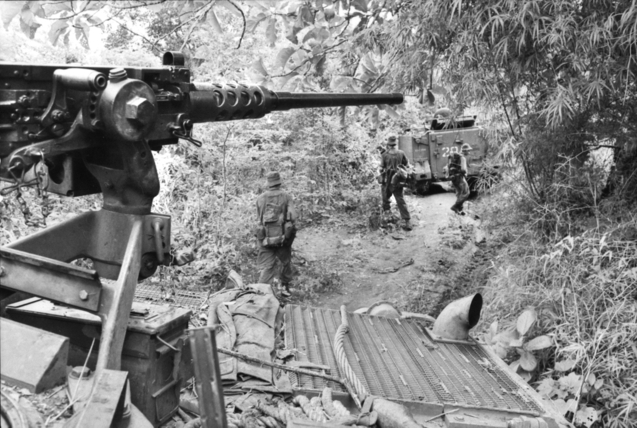
Australian soldiers and M113 APCs during Operation Smithfield

By morning the weather had cleared. At 06:55 the remainder of 6 RAR departed Nui Dat with 2 Troop, 1st APC Squadron, while D Company, 5 RAR departed at the same time aboard US Army helicopters. Meanwhile, at 07:40 Jackson arrived at 6 RAR's night location to observe the clearance, flying in as Townsend gave orders for the operation. Stepping off at 08:45, the Australians returned to the battlefield in strength, while artillery and airstrikes continued to hit the area. The battalion group moved in a "two up" formation with D Company, 5 RAR and D Company, 6 RAR both mounted in APCs as the forward left and forward right assault companies, followed by A, B and C Companies in depth, each dismounted. The assault companies planned to sweep the area then dismount and commence a detailed search, while the others would clear the surrounding features and begin the follow-up. Moving cautiously in case the VC launched a counter-attack, they advanced along the route used by D Company, 6 RAR the previous day. The battlefield was a scene of devastation, with rubber trees stripped of leaves and branches and bleeding sap, while the area around D Company's final position was heavily cratered. At 09:21 D Company, 5 RAR reported finding the body of a dead VC soldier; while half an hour later D Company, 6 RAR found 12 to 15 more. A large number of VC dead were found, including a 60 mm mortar crew. At 10:20 a bulldozer was requested to bury the bodies of approximately 100 VC soldiers.

==== Scale of Vietcong defeat and treatment of wounded Vietcong ====
By late morning, a total of 113 bodies and two wounded had been found, while numerous drag marks and blood trails indicated many more casualties had been moved the previous night. With the clearance continuing, two wounded VC still bearing arms were killed by D Company, 6 RAR after they moved to engage them, while in a separate incident another wounded soldier was also killed. A third wounded VC was later captured; and all three wounded were given first aid then being evacuated. (Note: One of the VC killed was armed with a rifle and the other a 60 mm mortar.) These events later caused controversy when journalist Ian Mackay published claims in 1968 that the Australians had deliberately killed unarmed VC wounded, citing a "witness" to the alleged incident; while a major newspaper stated they had killed wounded "civilians". An official investigation determined the allegations were exaggerated and based on hearsay, with the soldier claimed as the source found not to have been present during the fighting and those killed confirmed to have been armed. Similar accusations were made in 1986 by Terry Burstall, a former D Company soldier, who claimed up to 17 wounded VC had been executed, although they were also refuted, and his credibility challenged. In 2000, Buick admitted in his memoirs to having killed a mortally wounded soldier the day after the battle as an act of mercy. Burstall argued this may have constituted a breach of the Geneva Convention; while Buick's decision to publish was questioned by John Heslewood, the President of the Australian Long Tan Association and a private in 11 Platoon during the battle. Mollison later also criticised Buick's actions. In his 2015 autobiography, Harry Smith states that two mortally wounded VC soldiers were killed on 19 August out of compassion, one by Buick and another by a soldier from A Company, 6 RAR.

==== Recovery of lost Australian troops ====
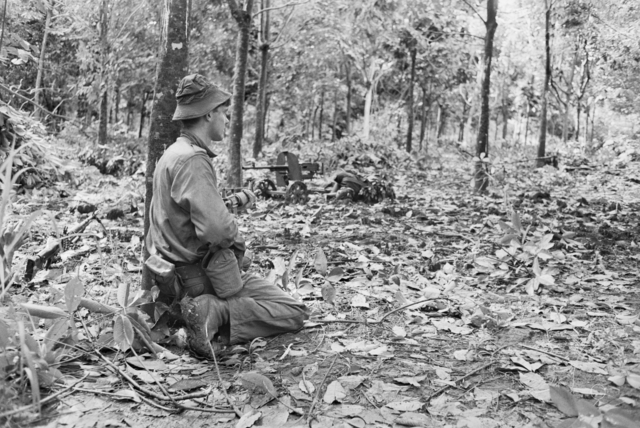
Second Lieutenant Dave Sabben advances cautiously through the rubber plantation the day after the battle

At 11:00 6 RAR reported they had located the bodies of the missing members of 11 Platoon, who were found lying in a straight line where they had been killed, largely undisturbed and still holding their weapons. The majority were from 6 Section, which had been the first to be hit. One man was found to have survived despite his wounds, having spent the night on the battlefield in close proximity to the VC as they attempted to evacuate their own casualties. Another wounded soldier had been found nearby, leaning against a tree but still alive. Both were evacuated, and later recuperated in hospital. Thirteen Australian dead were also recovered, accounting for all the missing. As the search continued, VC dead were found up to 500 metres (550 yd) south-east of the position reached by 11 Platoon. A large bunker complex was uncovered consisting of 200 pits with overhead protection sufficient for a battalion, but its layout suggested it had been constructed as a defensive position rather than for an ambush. Another position of 100 pits was found to the east. By 14:35, the total number of VC dead was reported as 168. A large amount of weapons and equipment were uncovered, including assault rifles, mortars, light machine guns, submachine guns, an RCL, plus ammunition and grenades. By 18:10, the figure had risen to 188 VC dead, with shallow graves dug by the Australians to bury them where they were found.

Due to the likely presence of a significant force nearby, the Australians remained cautious as they searched for the VC. Over the next two days, they continued to clear the battlefield, uncovering more dead as they did so. Yet, with up to two VC battalions still believed to be in the area and the continued vulnerability of Nui Dat to attack from the 274th Regiment, Jackson lacked the resources to pursue the withdrawing force. Company patrols searched up to 1,500 metres (1,600 yd) east, and to the north of Nui Dat 2. The search area was subsequently expanded to include that contested during Operation Hobart. Several tracks were found with telephone cables running along them, as well as more drag marks, blood stains, discarded equipment, fresh graves and evidence of use by heavy cart and foot traffic. The main VC withdrawal route was discovered after midday on 19 August. Townsend requested permission to follow it, believing he had sufficient forces, but Jackson would only permit 6 RAR to advance a further 1,000 metres (1,100 yd), remaining within artillery cover, and would not allow the guns to move forward to increase the range of their protective fire. By 20 August, the Australians had counted 245 VC dead, while scores more were found later. Up to four weeks after the battle, decomposed bodies were still found in the area, while numerous graves were also located, none of which were included in the estimates of VC losses. The bodies found later brought the total to about 300 dead. (Note: Smith gives a total of 293 by body count, comprising 245 buried on 19 August, with 48 more found in a shallow mass grave to the east on 20 August.) D Company, 5 RAR returned to Nui Dat early on 21 August, while D Company, 6 RAR was withdrawn for two days leave in Vung Tau.

The rest of 6 RAR continued the search, with A Company discovering a series of freshly built and recently abandoned hides along the VC withdrawal route, which were believed to have been prepared as delay positions. An older defensive position of approximately 40 pits was also found, while C Company located a makeshift hospital close by containing 14 graves. Both had recently been occupied. Later, an Australian OH-13 reported the presence of scattered groups of civilians, with the largest numbering 30 to 40 people—mostly women with baskets and bags, while others had ox carts—believed to be carrying medical supplies. These reports were followed up by the 1st APC Squadron and a number of military age males were detained for questioning. The infantry companies completed their search by midday, moving to the edge of the rubber plantation, 500 metres (550 yd) north-east of Long Tân. Smithfield concluded at 17:00, with the Australians returning to Nui Dat by helicopter and APC by 17:30. They had hoped to catch the remnants of the VC force before they could reach their mountain sanctuaries, but the operation failed to prevent their withdrawal. Some Australian officers later questioned the caution with which it was conducted. Jackson felt unable to mount a pursuit due to the continued threat posed by the 274th Regiment, which was still believed to be in the area. With 1 ATF lacking the resources required for such an operation, the opportunity to trap and destroy the VC while they were still vulnerable was lost and they made good their escape.

== Aftermath ==
=== Casualties ===
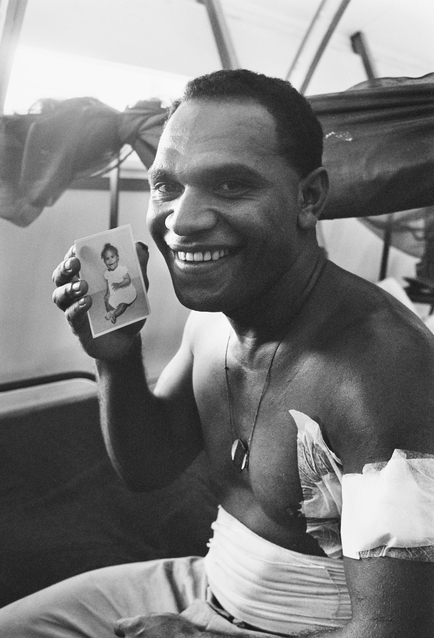
Corporal Buddy Lea, who was wounded in the battle, holding a photo of his daughter

VC and PAVN casualties were claimed by the Australians to have numbered 245 dead left on the battlefield and three captured, with many more were thought to have been removed as they withdrew. Others were so badly mutilated their remains were unidentifiable. Approximately half were believed to have been caused by artillery and the remainder by small arms. The initial estimate was given by an Australian Army spokesman, and some participants in the battle regarded them as inflated.

They were disputed by two prominent Australian military writers that fought in Vietnam , (Note: "The VC divisional planners estimated that four to six labourers would be needed for every wounded soldier requiring evacuation. A 30 percent casualty rate at Long Tan would mean a force of 1,200 would take 360 casualties. Using an 80:20 split for the casualties, 288 would be wounded and 72 killed. To get the seriously wounded and dead off the field, a labour force of something like 800 would be needed. If the casualty figures were increased to 245 dead, the wounded would be 980. Under the 30 per cent rule that would mean an attacking force of just over 4,000, plus a clearance labour force of 3,500. These are unimaginable numbers ...") with reports by a D Company veteran stating actual body counts as no more than 50. The 6th RAR War Diary reports that on 19 August no more than fifty Vietnamese dead were recovered and buried in the battlefield. Second Lieutenant Eric Andrews from C Company 6th RAR says his 8 Platoon was given the job of burying the 52 enemy dead reported to have been found on the battlefield. The Vietnamese Official History of the battle records 47 dead and another 100 wounded with 30 reported killed from the 275th Regiment and the remainder killed from D445 Battalion or smaller attached units or through their wounds, according to the research done on the part of the A Company commander, Captain Charles Morrison, primarily by artillery fire.

The Quartermaster's notebook of the 275th Regiment that was reportedly captured in early February 1968 by the Australian-New Zealand Battalion during Operation Coburg, reveals that 111 were wounded in the 275th Regiment, but there are no details of the wounded in D445 Battalion. Another estimate was 150 casualties according to Colonel Bao who was overall district commander, but did not directly participate. Captain Robert O'Neill (Intelligence Officer, 5th RAR) claims that no real evidence of heavy casualties in the form of makeshift operation centres, amputated limbs, graves, bloodied clothing, heavy blood-trails or drag marks were found in the deep sweep conducted by the 5th Battalion of the enemy withdrawal route from the Long Tan rubber plantation. (Note: "...the battalion had been keyed up to the possibility of a major encounter with the Viet Cong―a battle which would have had a decisive effect on the Viet Cong in Phuoc Tuy Province. Instead all we found was dense jungle with no trace of any large Viet Cong force ever having been in the area.")

Ernie Chamberlain, Australian military writer and veteran of the Vietnam war, says that Vietnamese duplications of the names of their veterans of the battle appear to be the main reason behind much of the confusion generated over the real number of the attackers involved and enemy dead at Long Tan. His research at first provided, the names, personal details and "giay bao tu" (death certificates) of 190 confirmed killed from the 275th Regiment, then later a revised list of 176 fatal casualties from the same Vietnamese unit. Many were reportedly killed or mortally wounded on the battlefield or may have died while undergoing emergency surgical operations during the retreat, according to his findings. The figure of 176 was soon, however corrected to 96 in his revised edition of his book.

Earlier on, in November 2011, Chamerlain had been contacted by a member from the Hanoi-based Vietnamese "Missing In Action" Non-Government-Organization (NGO) informing him that "397 VC" had died at Long Tan. This death toll soon made the rounds in several Vietnamese newspaper articles covering the fighting that took place on 18 August 1966. The claim in the Vietnamese media, that 397 Vietnamese soldiers fell at Long Tan was soon discarded for it was more than likely based on original Australian reports from the battlefield of 245 enemy killed and another 150 wounded that were dragged away.

After contacting Harry Smith and exchanging views of the battle as well as valuable documents and books, the former Australian Rifle Company Commander appears to have accepted much of the findings of Chamberlain and settled for a lower figure of 134 killed in the 275th Regiment and another 39 killed in supporting units.

In 1996, on the eve of the 30th anniversary of the Battle of Long Tan, experienced journalist Mark Baker, working at the time with The Sydney Morning Herald and investigating the number of Vietnamese attackers involved and their fallen, travelled to Vietnam to meet with the veterans group that fought as part of the 275th Regiment and after sitting down with the former commanders and shifting through all the available evidence wrote that "[The] senior Vietnamese officers made the startling claim that only 700 of their men had taken part in the battle — half the most conservative Australian estimate — and that only 30 had been killed."

The recovered 275th Regiment Quartermaster sergeant's notebook records on 20 August (two days after the battle at Long Tan) the number of available men in his regiment to be 852, 159 less men than the total strength of 1,011 (including rear-echelon units) recorded on the eve of battle, indicating 150 killed, wounded and missing in the battle. The notebook also included a detailed listing of 111 personnel who had fought at Long Tan, that could very well be in the opinion of retired army brigadier Chamberlain, the 275th Regiment's full list of wounded in the battle. A former senior officer (Nguyen Van Kiem) in D445 Battalion claimed that his unit suffered approximately 30 killed and wounded at Long Tan. A former platoon sergeant (Nguyen Van Nhuong) in D445 says casualties in his battalion were 10 killed in action with another 16 wounded.

The Australians estimated the VC had evacuated up to a further 350 casualties, including an unknown number of dead buried along the withdrawal route. With such losses representing the operational strength of two battalions, Australian intelligence assessed that the 275th Regiment, which had borne the brunt of the fighting, would be incapable of mounting a regimental-sized operation for several months, but the 275th Regiment carried out attacks against the ARVN 18th Division a week later. D445 Battalion, thought to have played a supporting role and to have suffered less heavily, was assessed as still capable of engaging forces up to company size, with a remaining strength of 300 men. (Note: Viet Cong records captured by US forces later indicated the full extent of their losses, with 275th Regiment commander's diary listing his unit's losses as 500 dead.) McNeill states that this was based on the capture of the diary of the battle commander Nguyen Thoi Bung, who later became the Deputy Defense Minister of Vietnam; but according to Ernest Chamberlain this has not been corroborated. A captured soldier stated D445 Battalion's casualties had been 70 killed and 100 wounded.

Whether the combat effectiveness of D445 and the 275th Regiment was eroded is in dispute, as the D445 were redeployed in September and October against the newly deployed 11th Armored Cavalry Taskforce, while the 275th were combat-capable a week later. Weapons captured included 33 AK-47s, seven RPD light machine-guns, five SKS rifles, four RPG-2 launchers, two 57 mm RCLs, two M1 carbines, a PPSh-41, Thompson submachine-gun, Browning Automatic Rifle, M1 Garand and an SGM heavy machine-gun. More than 10,500 rounds of small arms ammunition was recovered, as well as 300 hand grenades, 40 mortar bombs, 28 RPG-2 rockets and 22 RCL rounds.

Australian losses were 17 killed, one died of wounds and 24 wounded: approximately one third of the initial force engaged. (Note: The majority of the casualties were from D Company, 6 RAR which lost 17 killed and 19 wounded, three members of other sub-units were wounded, one of whom died of wounds, while three were evacuated due to "severe battle stress".) A high proportion were National Servicemen, drawing criticism in Australia where conscription for overseas service was increasingly controversial. The government later limited the number of conscripts to no more than 50 per cent of a unit, requiring a rapid and disruptive reorganisation within 1 ATF.

=== Recognition ===
In the aftermath, both sides claimed success. Heralded as an Australian victory against overwhelming odds, the battle was widely covered in the Western press, making headlines in Australia and the United States. 1 ATF received congratulatory messages from the US, South Vietnamese and Australian military commands in Vietnam, and from Prime Minister Harold Holt, while General William Westmoreland considered it one of the more spectacular allied victories to that point in the war. Despite their losses, the VC claimed to have inflicted a heavy defeat on the Australians. Shortly afterwards, leaflets circulated the province stating that "700 Australians were killed, one battalion and two companies were destroyed and two squadrons of APCs". Similar claims were repeated on Radio Hanoi on 27 August 1966, and the day after on Radio Peking. In contrast, the Vietnamese history of Dong Nai Province published in 1986 gave the battle little attention, claiming to have "eliminated 500 Australians and destroyed 21 tanks" while their own losses were not recorded. D445 Battalion later received a PAVN heroic unit citation, and the 275th Regiment may have been given a similar award. Many VC soldiers were also awarded Certificates of Commendation for their role in the fighting.

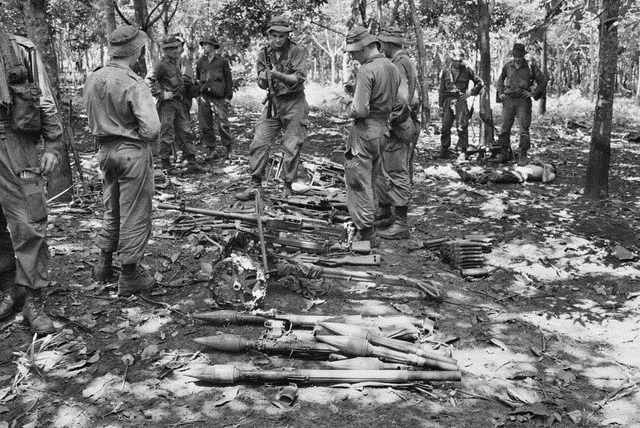
Australian troops with weapons captured at Long Tan

D Company, 6 RAR was awarded a US Presidential Unit Citation by President Lyndon Johnson on 28 May 1968. The Royal Australian Regiment and 3rd Cavalry Regiment were later awarded the battle honour "Long Tan", one of only five presented to Australian units during the war. Commonwealth decorations were made to 17 Australians and New Zealanders, including Smith who received the Military Cross (MC), Carter and Kirby the Distinguished Conduct Medal, Stanley the Member of the Order of the British Empire, Buick the Military Medal, Riley was awarded the Distinguished Flying Cross, and Dohle, Roberts, Kendall and Sabben were mentioned in despatches. Both Townsend and Jackson later received the Distinguished Service Order (DSO), although these were on the basis of their entire period in command, not solely for actions during the battle. South Vietnamese gallantry medals were also awarded to 22 Australians, but due to official policy regarding foreign awards they were not permitted to wear them until 2004. The limited number of awards later became the subject of considerable criticism.

At the time, the allocation of medals under the Imperial honours system was based on a quota, resulting in many of the original recommendations being downgraded or not awarded, with Smith initially nominated for the DSO, Sabben and Kendall the MC, and Sharp a posthumous mention in despatches. In 2008, a review recommended awards made to three officers be upgraded to the equivalent medals in the modern Australian honours system. Smith was subsequently awarded the Star of Gallantry, and Kendall and Sabben the Medal for Gallantry (MG). Following further review in 2009, Dohle received the Distinguished Service Medal, while D Company, 6 RAR was presented a Unit Citation for Gallantry on 18 August 2011. Another review in 2016 led to awards to ten more soldiers, including Roberts, Alcorta and Lance Corporal Barry Magnussen who received the MG, and Sharp and six others a Commendation for Gallantry. On 18 August 1969, 6 RAR erected the Long Tan Cross on the battlefield.

=== Assessment ===
Initial estimates of the VC force ranged from several companies to a battalion, yet following the battle Australian intelligence assessed it as having totalled between 1,500 and 2,500 men, while 1,000 were believed to have directly engaged D Company. The fighting left one-third of D Company killed or wounded. Long Tân proved a local setback for the VC, forestalling movement against Nui Dat. Although there were other large-scale encounters in later years, 1 ATF was not fundamentally challenged again. (Note: While the VC were largely forced to withdraw to the borders of the province by 1968–69, the situation in Phước Tuy was challenged during the 1968 Tet Offensive, in mid-1969 following the incursion of the PAVN 33rd Regiment, in mid-1971 with further incursions by the 33rd Regiment and several VC main force units, and during the Easter Offensive in 1972. Attacks on RF outposts and village incursions also continued.) The battle established the task force's dominance over the province, and allowed it to pursue operations to restore government authority. Yet such actions were atypical of the Australian experience, and although 1 ATF invariably inflicted heavy casualties on the VC when encountered in large numbers, they were less important than routine patrolling in separating the guerrillas from the population and maintaining constant pressure, coupled with pacification operations to extend South Vietnamese control. Nonetheless, Long Tân represented a watershed in the campaign, increasing the confidence of the Australians in their ability to defeat the VC and enhancing their military reputation.

The reasons for D Company's survival included superior radio communications which had allowed Stanley to co-ordinate the fire of the guns at Nui Dat, the weight of the artillery which repeatedly broke up the assaulting formations, its timely aerial resupply which prevented them running out of ammunition, and the mobility and firepower of the APCs in the relief force which broke the VC's will to fight. The battle highlighted the power of modern weapons and the importance of sound small-unit tactics, and has since been cited as an example of the effect of combined arms, demonstrating the effective coordination of infantry, armour, artillery and aviation. Artillery was the mainstay of the defence, with D Company supported by 24 guns of the 1st Field Regiment, RAA and A Battery, US 2/35th Artillery Battalion. Indirect fire provided close protection to the infantry, allowing D Company to hold their line and repulse any VC that succeeded in getting through the barrage. Likely forming-up positions and withdrawal routes had also been heavily engaged throughout the battle. In total 3,198 rounds of 105 mm ammunition were fired by the Australian and New Zealand field guns and 242 rounds of 155 mm high explosive by the Americans. The VC made the error of attacking within range of the artillery at Nui Dat and had to withstand the fire of three field batteries and one medium battery as a result. Long Tân also confirmed the importance of armoured support to infantry, even in dense jungle.

In the wake of the battle the Australians were left to speculate on the reason it occurred. One hypothesis was that the VC had intended to attack and overwhelm Nui Dat, with the initial plan to mortar the base to draw a response force into an ambush after which the base would be attacked and captured, but that they had been prevented from doing so after clashing with D Company. A second possibility was that they may have had the more limited aim of drawing an Australian force into an ambush to destroy it and secure a small victory over an isolated force. Finally, it was possible no ambush was planned at all, and that the VC had been moving on Nui Dat in regimental strength when they unexpectedly ran into D Company, resulting in an encounter battle. The evidence suggested they intended an attack on Nui Dat in some form, while the lack of prepared positions from which to mount an ambush made this unlikely. McNeill argues though that too many facts may be missing to make a conclusive assessment of VC intentions and to date no definitive Vietnamese account is available. In the years since the battle the intentions of the VC have been widely discussed, including by both participants and historians, with debate about it continuing until the present. Yet although there remains divided opinion about whether the VC had intended to attack the base at Nui Dat or to ambush an Australian element, according to Coulthard-Clark what is certain was that the force that clashed with D Company, 6 RAR "had been preparing a decisive action against 1 ATF". The outcome prevented them achieving a politically important victory so soon after the Australian deployment, and "placed Viet Cong plans in the province on the back foot for some time".

Long-standing disputes include the size of the PAVN/VC attacking force, the number of casualties they suffered, how the battle had unfolded and issues around alleged documentation. Some of the documents assessing casualties or impacts on the PAVN/VC were uncorroborated diaries and anecdotal evidence from "Chinese Generals". There were also issues with the size of the attacking PAVN/VC forces and communist dead by several authors and by the Red Dunes Film Group, which has received criticism from an Australian Vietnam War veteran and later historian and Vietnamese-language linguist Ernie Chamberlain. In 2015, Harry Smith published Long Tan, The Start of a Lifelong Battle in which he accused senior officers including Jackson and Townsend of fabricating claims about the battle, and alleged that the official history was disingenuous and self-serving. This included deliberate inflation of communist dead by army spokesmen and others, and embellishing the roles of officers at the battle at the expense of their men.

=== Lessons learned by the Australians ===
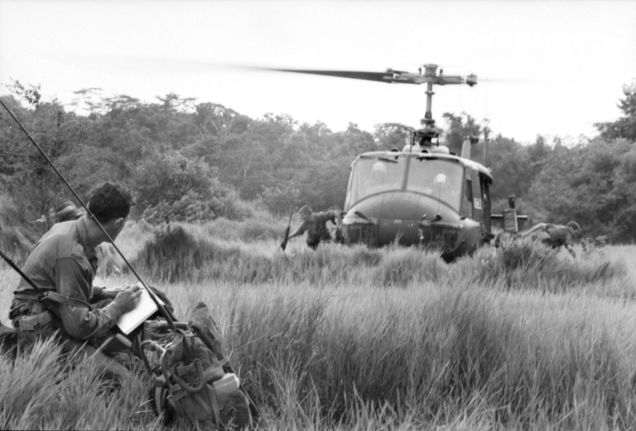
5 RAR soldiers disembarking from a US Army helicopter during Operation Toledo

After Long Tân a rifle company with armoured support was dedicated to provide a rapid reaction force, on standby to respond to an attack or exploit any opportunity. The VC had been armed with weapons at least equal to those used by the Australians. Most had carried modern Soviet assault rifles, as well as a large quantity of ammunition, which allowed them to sustain a high rate of fire. In contrast, the amount of ammunition carried by the Australians had been insufficient, and following the battle the minimum load was increased to 140 rounds per rifle and 500 for each machine gun. The aerial resupply of D Company had been delayed because no prepacked ammunition was available. This also changed, with rounds loaded in magazines for quick use. The VC had used 60 mm mortars, but they were no longer standard equipment for Australian rifle companies, and although battalions were issued 81 mm mortars they were controlled by Support Company. Such weapons would afford integral fire support in situations where their opponents had closed within the safety distance of the artillery, and consideration was given to their re-issue. Yet the added weight would limit the ability of sub-units to patrol and M-79 grenade launchers were issued instead, while some APCs were modified as mortar carriers.

Despite detecting a transmitter from the 275th Regiment moving west towards Nui Dat, such intercepts were unable to predict VC intentions with certainty, and patrols through the area also failed to find it. Jackson had responded by maintaining patrols at company strength when outside Line Alpha, while ensuring a level of base security. Townsend had not been given access to this intelligence and some officers were later critical of the restrictions placed on it. Although it would not have altered the requirement for a company-sized patrol it might have changed the way the battle was fought, and afterwards both battalion commanders were regularly briefed on such intercepts. The value of patrolling in depth and in sufficient strength to prevent the VC concentrating their forces had been reinforced, and while there was no change to the pattern of Australian operations, when a significant engagement was possible patrols would be a minimum of a company and would operate close enough to rapidly support each other to stop them becoming isolated. Lastly, the command relationship between the infantry and APCs had been problematic during the battle and changes to standard operating procedures were implemented to provide clearer direction in such circumstances.

=== Subsequent operations ===
A week following the battle US II FFV launched a large-scale corps-sized sweep of Phước Tuy on 23 August. Operation Toledo saw the deployment of two brigades of the US 1st Infantry Division, the 173rd Airborne Brigade, 1st Battalion, 26th Marines, and two ARVN Ranger battalions in an attempt to destroy the 274th and 275th Regiments. 1 ATF involvement included both 5 and 6 RAR and supporting units. It lasted until 8 September and despite the intensity of the previous fighting little contact occurred, with no evidence of a large force having been in the area uncovered. Poorly planned, it failed to trap the VC, while 5 RAR's involvement resulted in only two VC killed, one wounded and one captured without loss, although several tunnels were discovered in Long Tân village and destroyed. (Note: According to one source the entire allied operation "accounted for just 21" VC.) In the months that followed 1 ATF conducted further search and destroy, village cordon and search and route security operations to extend its control and to separate the local people from the influence of the VC. Such operations usually resulted in contacts between the Australians and small groups of VC, while during cordon and search operations of Bình Ba and Hòa Long a number of villagers suspected of sympathising with the VC were apprehended and handed over to the South Vietnamese authorities. Several search operations were also conducted in areas suspected of containing VC base camps, and these often resulted in the discovery of recently used and quickly evacuated camps, hospitals and logistic bases which were then destroyed. Meanwhile, 1 ATF continued an extensive patrolling and ambushing program around Nui Dat.

== 50th anniversary ==
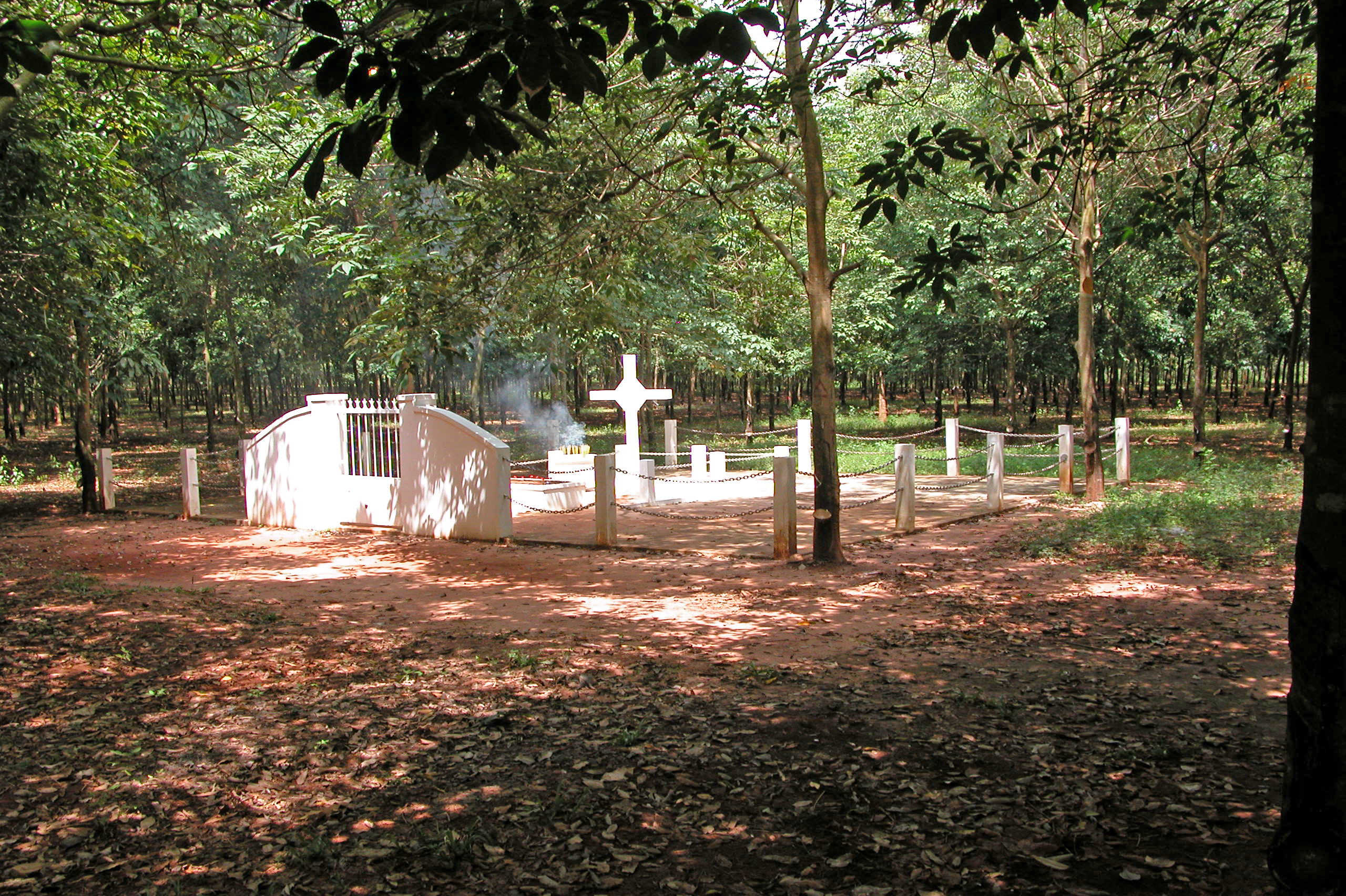
Australian memorial at Long Tan in 2005

Commemorated in Australia ever since, in time the battle became part of the legend of its involvement in the war. The best known of the Australian Army's actions in Vietnam, it has assumed a similar significance as battles such as Gallipoli, Kokoda and Kapyong. The date it was fought is observed annually as Long Tan Day and is also known as Vietnam Veterans' Remembrance Day, the national day of commemoration of the Vietnam War.

For the 50th anniversary a ceremony was held on the battlefield; more than 1,000 Australian veterans and their families travelled to Vietnam to participate. In Australia hundreds attended the Australian War Memorial and Vietnam Forces National Memorial in Canberra. Commemorations were also held at Sydney's Cenotaph, Brisbane's ANZAC Square, Melbourne's Shrine of Remembrance and elsewhere. In 2017, Turnbull negotiated for the repatriation of the original Long Tan cross, which was installed at the Australian War Memorial.

== In popular culture ==
- Danger Close: The Battle of Long Tan is a 2019 Australian war film about the battle. It was directed by Kriv Stenders and stars Travis Fimmel.
