= Travis Fimmel =

Australian actor and model

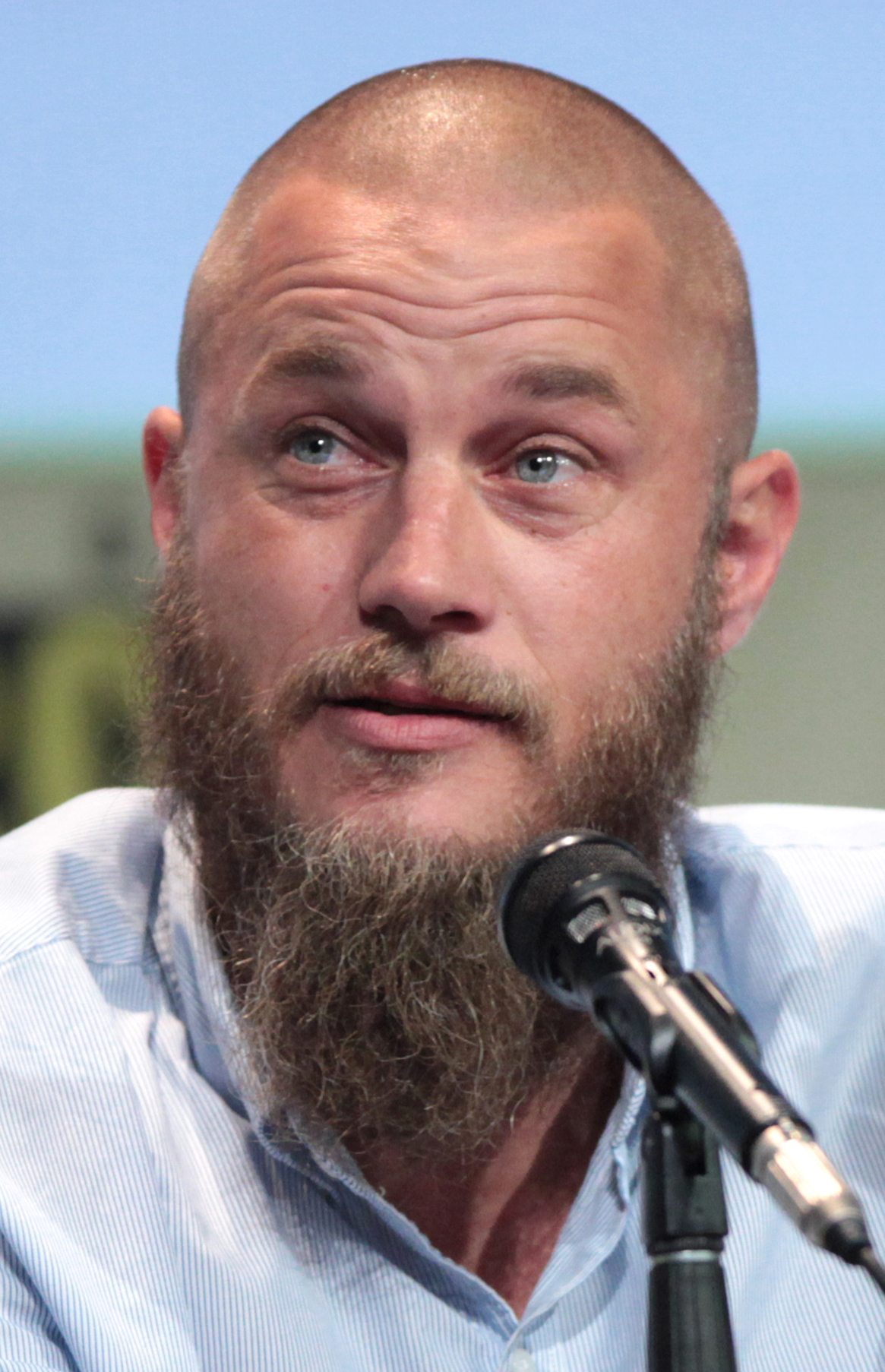
- Fimmel at the 2015 San Diego Comic-Con
- Born: July 15, 1979 (age 47); Echuca, Victoria, Australia
- Occupations: Actor; model
- Years active: 2002–present

Travis Fimmel is an Australian actor. He played Ragnar Lothbrok in the History Channel television series Vikings (2013–2017), Marcus in HBO science fiction series' Raised by Wolves, Desmond Hart in Dune: Prophecy, and the leading role of James Cormack in Black Snow (2024).

== Early life and education ==
Fimmel was born in Echuca, Victoria, Australia and was raised in Lockington. The youngest of three brothers, he is the son of Jennie, a recreation officer for disabled people, and Chris, a cattle farmer.

Aspiring to be a professional Australian rules footballer, Fimmel moved to Melbourne to play for the St Kilda Football Club in the AFL, but a broken leg sidelined him before the season began.

He was accepted into RMIT University for an architecture course, but later deferred to travel abroad.

== Modelling ==
Fimmel was spotted working out at a gym in the Melbourne suburb of Hawthorn by the flatmate of a talent scout for the Chadwick Models agency. He headed to the United States and was signed on the spot with agency LA Models in 2002, after walking into their office broke and barefoot. He became the first male model to secure a six-figure deal to model exclusively for Calvin Klein for a year, and the last to be personally contracted by the brand's eponymous designer. He fronted CK's Crave men's fragrance campaign and modelled the brand's underwear. He was named one of the world's sexiest bachelors by America's People magazine in 2002, and was highly in demand as a male model. He appeared on magazine covers, including Esquire, Rogue, Empire, At Large, Good Weekend, Numero Homme, and America's TV Guide.

He turned down an offer from Australia's Seven Network to be a guest judge on the TV series Make Me a Supermodel in 2012.

In March 2025, he became the face of the Saudi perfume brand Laverne.

== Acting career ==
=== 2001–2012: early work ===
Fimmel began his acting career by appearing in the music videos for Janet Jackson's song "Someone to Call My Lover" and "I'm Real" (original version) by Jennifer Lopez, both in 2001.

He studied under Ivana Chubbuck, the Hollywood acting coach of movie stars Brad Pitt and Jared Leto. He took two years to pluck up the courage to audition for his first role.

He landed the title lead in The WB series Tarzan in 2003, in which he did most of his own stunts. The series was cancelled after eight episodes. In addition, he appeared in two television pilots: The WB's drama Rocky Point with Lauren Holly in 2005, and the Fox crime thriller Southern Comfort with Madeleine Stowe in 2006.

In 2008, he played a murderer in the Australian film Restraint, and a party boy in Surfer, Dude with Matthew McConaughey and Woody Harrelson. In 2010, he portrayed a compassionate cowboy in Pure Country 2: The Gift and a forensic photographer in Australian horror film Needle, co-starring Ben Mendelsohn.

He depicted a talented classical pianist in Ivory, an independent film that was an Official Selection in the 2010 Montreal World Film Festival and the Strasbourg International Film Festival. The film was produced by Gray Frederickson and co-starred Martin Landau and Peter Stormare.

Fimmel played Helweg, a prison guard, in the 2010 film The Experiment, in a role reportedly offered to Elijah Wood, who pulled out of shooting for reasons unknown. The film is based on a real-life experiment on volunteers by Stanford University that was cut short after spinning out of control, with "guards" exhibiting sadistic behaviour and "prisoners" suffering depression.

Fimmel starred opposite Patrick Swayze in A&E's 2009 series The Beast. He played rookie undercover FBI agent Ellis Dove partnered with a hardened veteran cop, Swayze's Charles Barker. Production ceased after 13 episodes due to Swayze's death from pancreatic cancer. He played fugitive Mason Boyle in two episodes of NBC's 2010 action-adventure Chase, produced by Jerry Bruckheimer.

He appeared in FX's TV pilot crime drama Outlaw Country in 2011 with Luke Grimes.

Fimmel played the lead in 2012's Harodim with Peter Fonda as a former intelligence officer trained in black ops tracking down the world's most wanted terrorist, who is compromised by his own chain of command.

He co-starred with Billy Bob Thornton and Eva Longoria in the 2012 redneck Southern comedy flick The Baytown Outlaws, playing one of the three hapless Oodie brothers who bites off more than he can chew when he agrees to help a woman get her godson back from her deadbeat ex-husband.

=== 2013–2019: breakthrough and film work ===
Fimmel was signed as the lead character for four seasons in the critically acclaimed drama television series Vikings, co-starring Alexander Ludwig, Katheryn Winnick, Gabriel Byrne, Gustaf Skarsgard, and Linus Roache. Premiering in 2013, the show gained a cult following and chronicles "the extraordinary and ferocious world of the mighty Norsemen who raided, traded and explored during The Middle Ages." He played a character loosely based on Ragnar Loðbrók, the legendary Viking leader who is frustrated by the unadventurous tendencies of his local chieftain and strikes out to pillage new lands. USA Today described Fimmel's performance as "engaging", while The Huffington Post called it his "breakout role".

Fimmel starred as military commander Anduin Lothar in Warcraft in 2016, a live-action film adaptation of the Warcraft video game franchise. It was reported that a horse spooked by a wind fan collapsed on Fimmel while performing one of his own stunts, but he emerged unscathed.

He was cast as a quirky hipster in the romantic comedy Maggie's Plan with Ethan Hawke, Greta Gerwig, Maya Rudolph, Bill Hader, and Julianne Moore, and a loving but irresponsible father in Lean on Pete with Charlie Plummer and Steve Buscemi.

He was named as the Actor of the Year in GQ Australia's 2017 Men of the Year Awards.

Fimmel was the lead actor in Danger Close: The Battle of Long Tan, playing the role of Major Harry Smith who led soldiers under his command against the Viet Cong during the Battle of Long Tan in the Vietnam War. It is based on the historic account of 108 Australian and New Zealand soldiers who defeated an estimated 2,000 North Vietnamese soldiers in a rubber plantation near Nui Dat on 17 August 1966.

He co-stars as a deputy sheriff opposite fellow Australian Margot Robbie in the indie film Dreamland. Set in the 1930s Dust Bowl, the story follows a teenage boy on his quest to beat out the FBI to capture a fugitive bank robber in order to claim a bounty and save the family farm.

=== 2020–present: television and film balance ===
In 2020, Fimmel featured as a TV presenter in Here Are the Young Men, which was adapted from a novel about three Dublin high school graduates whose epic binge to mark the end of an era is blighted by catastrophe.

From 2020 to 2022, he appeared in HBO Max's science fiction drama Raised by Wolves from director Ridley Scott and Scott Free Productions, which marked Fimmel's return to television. It was a role that earned him a nomination for Best Actor in a Science Fiction/Fantasy Series at the Critics' Choice Super Awards. The dystopian narrative depicts him as an atheist soldier with a mysterious backstory in a new society created after a war sparked by religious differences decimates Earth.

In a review of his role as a killer-for-hire in the 2021 action-crime thriller Die in a Gunfight, Forbes states that Fimmel "steals every scene he’s in and has what could be the most compelling and morally tangled [character] arc of anyone in the entire story".

Fimmel played a genius, reclusive and kooky inventor in the science fiction, neo-noir film Zone 414. It co-starred Guy Pearce and was set in a colony of state-of-the-art humanoid robots and drew comparisons to Blade Runner.

He also appeared in indie drama Delia's Gone, co-starring Marisa Tomei, based on a short story about a black man with an intellectual disability who is accused of his sister's murder and embarks on a journey to clear his name and find out who's responsible.

In One Way, Fimmel plays a mysterious passenger who meets a lifelong criminal played by Colson Baker, aka Machine Gun Kelly, who has stolen from the biggest mob boss in town and boards a bus to flee. He also appeared in Fool's Paradise, a comedy by Charlie Day about a fool for love who becomes an accidental celebrity only to lose it all.

Featuring in AMC+ western series That Dirty Black Bag, he was credited as a producer, and co-starred with Dominic Cooper, Douglas Booth, and Aidan Gillen. It shows a clash between an apparently incorruptible sheriff with a dark past and a taciturn bounty killer trapped by a desire for vengeance that cannot be fulfilled.

Fimmel plays cold-case detective in the Stan Original mini-series Black Snow. His performance in Season 1 earned him a nomination for Best Lead Actor in a Drama in the 2024 AACTA Awards. In March 2024, Black Snow was renewed for a second series with Fimmel reprising the role. Season 2 aired from 1 January 2025, with Fimmel directing an episode.

He was cast in Stan's satirical series Caught with Susan Sarandon, Sean Penn, Matthew Fox, Lincoln Younes, and real-life Channel 9 TV presenters Karl Stefanovic and Ally Langdon. The storyline centres around four irreverent Australian soldiers mistaken for Americans in a war-torn country who realise that they can be social media famous when they produce a hostage video that goes viral.

Helping to bring the bestselling novel Boy Swallows Universe to Netflix, Fimmel stars as a drug-dealing stepdad. The story is based on a semi-autobiographical memoir by Trent Dalton.

He co-starred with Gerard Butler in the 2023 CIA thriller Kandahar, with a script written by a former military intelligence officer and based on his real-life experiences in Afghanistan.

Fimmel was cast in the western film Rust, but production was temporarily suspended in New Mexico when a prop gun with a live bullet allegedly fired by co-star Alec Baldwin killed cinematographer Halyna Hutchins and led to involuntary manslaughter charges. Fimmel plays bounty hunter Fenton "Preacher" Lang who joins a US Marshal in pursuit of Baldwin's character, outlaw Harland Rust.

Fimmel played a mysterious soldier Desmond Hart in the 2024 TV series Dune: Prophecy.

== Personal life ==
Fimmel's favourite recreational activities include Australian rules football, fishing, camping, horse riding, surfing, riding motorbikes, and going to the beach.

Fimmel is known for his preference for going barefoot, a trait incorporated into his character Anduin Lothar in Warcraft.

Fimmel played a celebrity cricket match in the 2009 Australia vs England Hollywood Ashes with fellow Australian actors Jesse Spencer from House, Cameron Daddo, celebrity chef Curtis Stone, INXS bass guitarist Garry Gary Beers and cricket fast bowler Michael Kasprowicz.

Fimmel has expressed a desire to return to farm life in Australia once he is finished with acting.

=== Business ventures ===
In 2022, Fimmel founded his own beer brand Travla with the winner of the fourth series of MasterChef Australia, Andy Allen, and ex Essendon Football Club CEO Xavier Campbell as executive director and one of the CEOs.

== Filmography ==
Key
†	Denotes works that have not yet been released

=== Film ===
Year	Title	Role	Notes	Ref
2008	Surfer, Dude	Johnny Doran		
2008	Restraint	Ronald "Ron" Jason Beron		
2010	Pure Country 2: The Gift	Dale Jordan		
2010	Needle	Marcus Rutherford		
2010	Ivory	Jake		
2010	The Experiment	Helweg		
2011	Supremacy	Garrett Tully	Short film	
2012	The Baytown Outlaws	McQueen Oodie		
2012	Harodim	Lazarus Fell		
2015	Maggie's Plan	Guy Childers		
2016	Warcraft	Anduin Lothar		
2017	Lean on Pete	Ray Thompson		
2019	Finding Steve McQueen	Harry Barber		
2019	Danger Close: The Battle of Long Tan	Major Harry Smith		
2019	Dreamland	George Evans		
2020	Here Are the Young Men	TV Presenter		
2021	Die in a Gunfight	Wayne McCarthy		
2021	Zone 414	Marlon Veidt		
2022	Delia's Gone	Stacker Cole		
2022	One Way	Will		
2023	Kandahar	Roman Chalmers		
2024	Rust	Fenton "Preacher" Lang		
2026	Pathetic Fallacy	Doyle		
TBA	Cupid †		Filming	

=== Television ===
Year	Title	Role	Notes	Ref
2003	Tarzan	John Clayton / Tarzan	Main role, 8 episodes	
2005	Rocky Point	Taj Walters	Television pilot	
2006	Southern Comfort	Bobby	Television pilot	
2009	The Beast	Ellis Dove/Carlson	Main role, 13 episodes	
2010	Chase	Mason Boyle	2 episodes	
2012	Outlaw Country	Feron	Television movie	
2012	Black Box	Ted	Episode: "AZEP: The Reawakening"	
2013−2017	Vikings	Ragnar Lothbrok	Main role (seasons 1–4); 45 episodes	
2020–2022	Raised by Wolves	Caleb / Marcus	Main role, 18 episodes	
2022	That Dirty Black Bag	Anderson	3 episodes	
2023–present	Black Snow	James Cormack	Main role (seasons 1-2), 12 episodes	
2023	Caught	Dingo	2 episodes	
2024	Boy Swallows Universe	Lyle Orlik	3 episodes	
2024-present	Dune: Prophecy	Desmond Hart	Main role	

== Awards and nominations ==
Year	Award	Category	Work	Result	Ref.
2013	IGN Awards	Best TV Hero	Vikings	Nominated	
2021	Critics' Choice Super Awards	Best Actor in a Science Fiction/Fantasy Series	Raised by Wolves	Nominated	
2024	AACTA Awards	Best Lead Actor in Drama	Black Snow	Nominated	
2024	Logie Awards	Best Supporting Actor	Boy Swallows Universe	Nominated	
2025	AACTA Awards	Best Supporting Actor in Drama	Boy Swallows Universe	Nominated	
2026	AACTA Awards	Best Lead Actor in Drama	Black Snow	Nominated	

== See also ==
- List of barefooters
- List of male underwear models
- Australians
- List of Australian film actors
