= Oliver David Jackson =

Australian Army officer

- David Jackson, then a brigadier, while serving as Commander 1 ATF in South Vietnam in 1966.
- Born: 24 November 1919; London, England
- Died: 7 May 2004 (aged 84); Burradoo, New South Wales, Australia
- Relatives: Robert Jackson (father); Donald Robert Jackson (brother)
- Military career
- Allegiance: Australia
- Branch: Australian Army
- Service years: 1937–1974
- Rank: Brigadier
- Nickname: "O.D."
- Commands: 1st Australian Task Force (1966–67); Australian Army Force Vietnam (1965–66); Australian Army Training Team Vietnam (1965); 2nd Battalion, Royal Australian Regiment (1963–64); 3rd Battalion, Royal Australian Regiment (1963); 1st Battalion, Royal Australian Regiment (1956–57)
- Conflicts: Second World War; North African Campaign; Syria–Lebanon Campaign; New Guinea campaign; Battle of Buna–Gona; Finisterre Range campaign; Occupation of Japan; Vietnam War; Battle of Long Tan
- Awards: Distinguished Service Order; Officer of the Order of the British Empire

Brigadier Oliver David Jackson, DSO, OBE (24 November 1919 – 7 May 2004) was a senior officer in the Australian Army, seeing service during the Second World War and the Vietnam War. After graduating from the Royal Military College, Duntroon, in 1939 he served in the Middle East and New Guinea during the Second World War. Later, he commanded the Australian Army Training Team Vietnam (AATTV) and the Australian Army Force Vietnam (AAFV) in 1965–66. In 1966, he became the first commander of 1st Australian Task Force (1 ATF) in South Vietnam. He subsequently filled a number of senior command and staff positions before retiring in 1974. He died in 2004.

== Early life ==
Jackson was born in London, England, on 24 November 1919. The youngest son of Robert Jackson, a professional soldier, and his wife Edith Marguerite (née Vautin); his siblings included an older brother born in 1915 in Surrey, England, and a sister. Named after his uncle, David, who had been killed at Gallipoli in 1915 while attempting to rescue a wounded soldier, Jackson was known throughout his life as either "O.D." or David. His father had been commissioned in the Permanent Military Forces (PMF) in 1911, serving in Western Australia.

With the outbreak of the First World War Jackson's father had joined the Australian Imperial Force (AIF) in November 1914, embarking as adjutant of the 10th Light Horse Regiment. On 29 May 1915 he was wounded at Gallipoli and after recovering in England held a number of staff appointments with the 3rd Division on the Western Front in 1917–18. Following Jackson's birth the family returned to Australia in 1920 so that his father could resume his military career. He subsequently attended a number of schools, completing his secondary education at Scotch College, Melbourne in 1936, where he was a member of the athletics and rugby teams.

== Military career ==
=== Early career and Second World War ===
Jackson subsequently joined the Australian Army in March 1937 as a regular officer in the PMF. His older brother, Donald, was also a professional soldier, having entered the Royal Military College, Duntroon in 1934 and later also reached the rank of brigadier. After completing his own training at Duntroon, Jackson graduated into the infantry as a lieutenant in December 1939, following the outbreak of the Second World War two months earlier. Transferring to the 2nd AIF for overseas service, in July 1940 he took up his first appointment commanding a platoon in the 2/25th Battalion where he saw action in the Middle East in North Africa and Syria.

Meanwhile, Jackson's father had been appointed to command Northern Command in May 1940 and was promoted to major general in July. However, the following year he was posted to Western Command and believed that he had been passed over for a combat command after opposing the Brisbane Line strategy, subsequently retiring in early 1942. By late 1942 Jackson's battalion returned from the Middle East, and he later served in New Guinea fighting the Japanese at Gona, as well as in the Ramu Valley, the Finisterre Ranges and the New Guinea north coast. He was subsequently posted to Headquarters 18th Brigade as a major during the period 1943–44. In June 1944, he took up a position as an instructor at the Canadian Staff College in Kingston, where he remained until the end of the war.

=== Interbellum ===
Returning to Australia, Jackson filled a number of staff positions, including postings to the Royal Military College, Army Headquarters and Headquarters Western Command. His father died of pneumonia at Heidelberg, Victoria, on 24 November 1948. Jackson was promoted to lieutenant colonel in 1949 and to colonel in 1951. On 21 June 1956, Jackson assumed command of the 1st Battalion, Royal Australian Regiment (1 RAR) in South Korea deployed as part of the UN garrison which had remained there following the end of the Korean War and oversaw the battalion's final operational activities before its return to Australia. He subsequently took up a two-year appointment in the United States as Australian Military Attache in Washington. In 1959 he was appointed as an Officer of the Order of the British Empire (OBE) in recognition of his service to the Australian Staff Corps.

=== Vietnam War ===
In 1961, he took up the position of Director of Infantry at Army Headquarters. He subsequently commanded the 3rd Battalion, Royal Australian Regiment (3 RAR) in 1963, before serving as the commanding officer of the 2nd Battalion, Royal Australian Regiment (2 RAR) in 1963–64. Ultimately, Jackson was the only officer to command all three of the original battalions of the Royal Australian Regiment. Jackson took over command of the Australian Army Training Team Vietnam (AATTV) on 5 February 1965. Following the arrival of Australian ground forces in South Vietnam in May 1965, he was promoted to brigadier and assumed command of the new headquarters in Saigon, known as the Australian Army Force Vietnam (AAFV).

In March 1966, the Australian government further increased its commitment to the Vietnam War, announcing the deployment of a two-battalion brigade with armour, aviation, engineer and artillery support, designated the 1st Australian Task Force (1 ATF). Jackson was subsequently appointed as its first commander. Based in Phuoc Tuy Province, South Vietnam, 1 ATF was involved in counter-insurgency operations against the Viet Cong. During his period in command the task force was successfully established at Nui Dat, clearing a security zone around the base and conducting offensive operations to the edge of the Tactical Area of Responsibility, while a number of significant actions were fought, including the Battle of Long Tan, which established 1 ATF's dominance over the province. Jackson was later awarded the Distinguished Service Order (DSO) for his command of 1 ATF during this period.

In June 1967, Jackson returned to Australia having served nearly two years in Vietnam, and subsequently served on the staff of Australian Headquarters. His final posting was as the Chief of Staff at Headquarters 1st Division, before retiring with the rank of brigadier in May 1974.

== Later life ==
Settling in Sydney in his later life Jackson enjoyed sailing and gardening. Married to Dorothy Honor, the couple had a son and two daughters. Jackson died in Burradoo, New South Wales, on 7 May 2004, aged eighty-four.
