= Unit Citation for Gallantry =

- insignia worn if a member of the unit when earned (left) and if joined after (right)
- Type: Unit Citation
- Awarded for: Extraordinary gallantry in action
- Presented by: Australia
- Eligibility: Australian military units
- Status: Currently awarded
- Established: 15 January 1991
- First award: 27 November 2004
- Final award: 1 June 2018

Highlights
- Total: 6
- Total awarded posthumously: 1
- Award streamer
- Related: Commendation for Gallantry

The Unit Citation for Gallantry is a collective group decoration awarded to members of Australian military units. It recognises extraordinary gallantry in action. The Unit Citation for Gallantry was created in 1991, along with the Meritorious Unit Citation. The actual citation is a warrant presented to the unit. Insignia are worn by individuals to denote their membership of a unit that has been awarded a citation. Personnel cannot be issued with the insignia until the authorised unit representative, normally the Commanding Officer, has been formally invested with the citation.

== Recipients ==
As of June 2018, six awards have been made:

- No.1 Special Air Service Squadron.
  - Awarded 27 November 2004
  - Citation states: For extraordinary gallantry in action involving the development and execution of bold, innovative plans in support of complex, high risk operations in Operation Falconer in Iraq in 2003.
- Special Air Service Regiment and 4th Battalion, Royal Australian Regiment (Commando).
  - Awarded 22 November 2006
  - Presented to 4RAR on 26 October 2007
  - Citation states: For acts of extraordinary gallantry in action in Afghanistan, from 25 August 2005 to 2 September 2006, in support of security and stabilisation operations in Afghanistan and the International Coalition against Terrorism. During the course of the operation, the Task Group fought a series of precarious battles and skirmishes against a resourceful enemy. The Task Group was also able to successfully neutralise the enemy on a number occasions in previously impenetrable sanctuary areas. With clear, strategic combat duties, the Task Group quickly stamped their authority in the combat region despite being in the heartland of the Taliban and Anti Coalition Militia. During the 374-day deployment, the combat element spent 309 days in the field undertaking over 100 missions resulting in 139 combat engagements with the enemy ranging from small skirmishes to full scale battles.
- Delta Company, 6th Battalion, Royal Australian Regiment.
  - Awarded 31 March 2010
  - Citation states: For acts of extraordinary gallantry in action at the Battle of Long Tan in Vietnam on 18 August 1966.
- HMAS Yarra.
  - Awarded 4 March 2014
  - Citation states: acts of extraordinary gallantry in action in 1942.
- 1st Australian Task Force.
  - Awarded on 13 May 2018
  - Citation states: The Battle of Coral/Balmoral began on the morning of 13 May 1968, when 102 Field Battery and mortars from 1 RAR were attacked by 1000 plus fresh and well-armed NVA where the ratio NVA to Australian was 13:1. Bloody hand to hand fighting pursued until the impact of 102 Battery firing splintex at point-blank range into the massed NVA broke up the attack and saved what was left of the mortars and the guns of 102 Fd Bty. Throughout the remaining 26 day duration of the deployment, elements of the Australian Task Force, including 1 and 3 RAR, A Sqn 3rd Cav Regt, C Sqn 1st Armd Regt, 12 Fd Regt RAA (-) and 1st Fd Sqn, RAE with other TF supporting elements were involved in defending brutal and continual regimental and battalion attacks on the two fire support and patrol bases enduring mortar, rocket propelled grenade, and recoilless-rifle fire, whilst conducting offensive action against well prepared and defended bunker systems. The Task Force's persistence slowly turned the battle from a desperate defensive battle into a battle of domination. Throughout the period 12 May - 6 Jun 68, extraordinary individually and collective gallantry was displayed on numerous actions that warranted recognition by way of awarding the Unit Citation for Gallantry to units and men of 1ATF(-).
- Royal Australian Navy Helicopter Flight Vietnam
  - Awarded on 1 June 2018
  - Citation states: For acts of extraordinary gallantry in action in South Vietnam from October 1967 to June 1, 1971.

== Description ==
- The insignia of a Unit Citation for Gallantry is a gilt sterling-silver rectangular frame (32mm x 15mm) with a design of flames emanating from the edge to the centre. The frame surrounds a ribbon bar of deep green, which may display a gilt sterling-silver Federation Star (7mm diameter) at its centre.
- Members attached to the unit when the citation is awarded wear it with the Federation Star, and continue to wear this after leaving the unit. Members who subsequently join the unit wear the citation without the Federation Star, and discontinue wearing it after leaving the unit.

== See also ==
- Australian Honours Order of Precedence
