= Bravery Meeting 84 (Australia) =

The Bravery Council of Australia Meeting 84 Honours List was announced by the Governor General of Australia on 17 March 2016.

Awards were announced for the Star of Courage, Bar to the Bravery Medal, the Bravery Medal, Commendation for Brave Conduct and Group Bravery Citation.
