= Bravery Meeting 76 (Australia) =

The Bravery Council of Australia Meeting 76 Honours List was announced by the Governor General of Australia on 10 March 2012.

Awards were announced for the Star of Courage, the Bravery Medal, Commendation for Brave Conduct and Group Bravery Citation.

† indicates an award given posthumously.

== Star of Courage (SC) ==
- Robert McKenzie Fenwick †, New South Wales

== Bravery Medal (BM) ==
- Anthony Robert Ayers, Queensland
- Benjamin Baiada, New South Wales
- Sergeant Lisa Joy Blick, Victorian Police
- Michael Hastings Carter, New South Wales
- Paul Andrew Erlandsen, Victoria
- Brett Raymond French, New South Wales
- Arron Damien Graham, Victoria
- Peter Gerard Halcro, New South Wales
- Terrence Bruce Hall, Victoria
- Constable Andrew James Hawkins, Queensland Police
- Paul Jackman†, late of New South Wales
- Paul Steven Moffatt, New South Wales
- Mr Ben Dolphas Pere, Western Australia
- Stojce Petreski†, late of New South Wales
- Nathan Owen Schofield, New South Wales
- Mr Robert Sparkes, New South Wales
- Lisa Jane Webster, Victoria
- Michael Patrick Williams, New South Wales
- Peter Lloyd Williams, New South Wales

== Commendation for Brave Conduct ==
- Robert Luis Bosetti, Victoria
- Lynn Maree Brooks, Victoria
- Leading Senior Constable Allan Bradgate Davies, New South Wales Police
- Detective Senior Constable Ross Dobbie, Queensland Police
- Daniel John Doble, Queensland
- Byron Willard Douglas, Queensland
- Corporal Brenton Edwards, Victoria
- Mark Jason Enright, Victoria
- Ashleigh Audrey Flanagan, New South Wales
- David Michael Grabham, New South Wales
- Allan Frederick Harms, New South Wales
- Michael James Hay, Queensland
- Constable Kim Henderson, Queensland Police
- Frederick Charles Hoare, Queensland
- Constable Shaun Robert Jones, Queensland Police
- Michael Thomas Kennedy, Queensland
- Angus Frank Kent, New South Wales
- Arthur Koole, Victoria
- Jovana Ljubojevic, New South Wales
- Senior Constable Rohan Ian McDonald, Queensland Police
- Maeve McLoughlin, Northern Ireland
- Nathan Scott McSween, Victoria
- Nicholas William Macreadie, Victoria
- Luke Zac Martin, New South Wales
- Constable Megan Louis Meleady, Queensland Police
- Ricky Frederick Morse, Queensland
- Constable Gregory Arthur Naoum, Queensland Police
- David Francis Nolan, Australian Capital Territory
- Senior Constable Sebastian Robinson Pollock, Queensland Police
- Arnold Russell Porter, Victoria
- Grant Robert Ridley, Australian Capital Territory
- James Anthony Rohan, Victoria
- Inspector Christopher Charles Sammut, New South Wales Police
- Dr Stephen Anthony Simmons, New South Wales
- James Danforth Small, New South Wales
- Sergeant Scott Thomas Spence, Queensland Police
- Constable Adam Gary Stafford, Queensland Police
- Joanna Stavrou, New South Wales
- Anthony John Steep, Victoria
- Lance Carlyle Till†, late of Queensland
- Nathan Elliot Webb, Western Australia

== Group Bravery Citation ==
- Ian Gordon Carter, New South Wales
- Neil William McLennan, New South Wales
- Trevor John McLennan, New South Wales
- John James Tapp†, late of New South Wales
- Senior Constable Lee James Gadd, Queensland Police
- Constable Andrew James Hawkins, Queensland Police
- Senior Constable Paul Keith Quin, Queensland Police
- Constable Adam Gary Stafford, Queensland Police
- The Reverend William Nairn Morris, New South Wales
- Peter James Baird, New South Wales
- Byron Willard Douglas, Queensland
- Douglas John Forsyth, New South Wales
- Sergeant Arthur William Brennan APM, Queensland Police
- Senior Constable Sebastian Robinson Pollock, Queensland Police
- Robert Callaghan, New South Wales
- Michael Stephen Wyllie, New South Wales
- Robert Sears, Tasmania
