= Bravery Meeting 82 (Australia) =

The Bravery Council of Australia Meeting 82 Honours List was announced by the Governor General of Australia on 30 March 2015.

Awards were announced for the Star of Courage, the Bravery Medal, Commendation for Brave Conduct and Group Bravery Citation.

== Star of Courage (SC) ==
Star of Courage ribbon

For acts of conspicuous courage in circumstances of great peril.
- The late Angela Edith Ferullo, Western Australia.
- Christina Jane King, Trinity Beach, Queensland.

== Bravery Medal (BM) ==
Bravery Medal ribbon

For acts of bravery in hazardous circumstances.
- Margaret Alexander-Kew, Como, Western Australia.
- Sergeant Peter John Anderson-Barr, Queensland Police Service
- Anne Doreen Cantwell, Abbotsford, Victoria.
- Nicholas Hugh Costello, St Kilda East, Victoria.
- Michael Olaf Doll, Mount Gambier, South Australia.
- Graham George Drage, Warracknabeal, Victoria.
- The late Jicenta-Leigh Fullerton, Quorn, South Australia.
- Kurtis Terry Gillan, New South Wales.
- Senior Constable Mark Robert Gray, Queensland Police Service.
- Graeme Roy Guelfi, Junee, New South Wales.
- Master Calyn John Hoad, Beenleigh, Queensland.
- Robert J. T. Horgan, Doncaster, Victoria.
- Lindsey Matthew Isaac-Davies, Port Macquarie, New South Wales.
- Tom Fairbridge Koch-Emmery, Queensland.
- Saliya Jimmy Kulasekera, Perth, Western Australia.
- Senior Constable Leanne Magarry, Queensland Police Service.
- Eric James Mahony, Werribee, Victoria.
- Luke James Pulford, Mount Gambier, South Australia.
- The late Jordan Lucas Rice, Robina, Queensland.
- Shayden Bray Schrader, Port Macquarie, New South Wales.
- Rod Shearer, Huntly, Victoria.
- Jeffrey Ryan Smyth, Toorak, Victoria.
- Tony Stephenson, Quilpie, Queensland.
- The late Alan Kennedy Turkington, Mudgeeraba, Queensland.
- Andrew Phillip Willsmore, Underbool, Victoria.
- Senior Constable Thomas William Wilson, Queensland Police Service.

== Commendation for Brave Conduct ==
Commendation for Brave Conduct ribbon

For acts of bravery considered worthy of recognition
- Tony Anatole Bondarenko, Omeo, Victoria.
- Bruce David Boreham, Lapstone, New South Wales.
- Derek Lawrence Bowers, Darlington, Western Australia.
- Jonathan Cawood, Eltham, Victoria.
- Leading Senior Constable Colin Richard Cooper, Victoria Police.
- Sergeant David Thomas Cooper, Victoria Police.
- Benjamin Terrence Dingle, Lowmead, Queensland.
- Gary Reginald Dingle, Lowmead, Queensland.
- Joel Michael Donkin, Rainbow Flat, New South Wales.
- David James Ferris, Cooroy, Queensland.
- Murray John Frean, Ellenbrook, Western Australia.
- Rodney Mervyn Free, Mundubbera, Queensland.
- Brock Ashley Grazotis, Tewantin, Queensland.
- Leslie John Green, Northern Territory.
- Pilot Officer Kenrick Robert Horgan, Canberra, Australian Capital Territory.
- Kimberley Helene Kermode, Southport, Queensland.
- Peter John Krogh, Gin Gin, Queensland.
- James Laughton, Eden Hills, South Australia.
- Gavin Lloyd Lawrence, Wollongong, New South Wales.
- Brett Anthony Leach, Mackay, Queensland
- Christopher James Leach, Malua Bay, New South Wales.
- Quinn James Matthews, Apollo Bay, Victoria.
- Sergeant Jason Joseph Mercer, Western Australia Police.
- Benjamin Alan Nelson, Karana Downs, Queensland.
- Terrence William O'Brien OAM, RFD, Red Hill, Australian Capital Territory.
- Lyle John Opperman, Tinana, Queensland
- Rhys William Roccamante, Wynnum West, Queensland.
- Steven Scott, Bathurst, New South Wales.
- Mitchell Brian Stephen, Victoria.
- Alicia Aqua Summer.
- Cody Sunderland, Windaroo, Queensland.
- Detective Sergeant Anissa Maree Terry, Queensland Police Service.
- Detective Senior Sergeant Glenn Victor Terry, Queensland Police Service.
- Luke Anthony Walters, Queensland.
- Gary John Wasson, Helidon, Queensland.
- The late John Hermann Windshuttle, New South Wales.

== Group Bravery Citation ==
Awardees are members of the public who intervened and chased an armed man who was attempting a car-jacking at Griffith, Australian Capital Territory on 12 August 2011.

- Brenton John Bilston, Griffith, Australian Capital Territory.
- Aron John Crowhurst, Applecross, Western Australia.
- Brian Edward Gillett, Perth, Western Australia.
- James Douglas Gray, Western Australia.
- Mark Raymond Kelly, Queanbeyan, New South Wales.
- Jared Michael Millest, Perth, Western Australia.
- Darren Victor Sawyer, South Melbourne, Victoria.

Awardees are members of the public who attempted to rescue a man trapped in a burning vehicle at Milltown, Victoria on 14 October 2012.

- Peter Hayes Atkinson, Thornbury, Victoria.
- Brenton Anthony Bailey, Portland, Victoria.
- Eddin Basic, Portland, Victoria.
- Rebecca Kate Trinnick, Horsham, Victoria.

Awardees are three students and a teacher who went to the rescue of a woman trapped in floodwater at Tuggerah, New South Wales on 8 June 2007.

- Gregory William De Bono, Killarney Vale, New South Wales
- Kalgan John Dewhurst, Dudley, New South Wales.
- Leonard John Swain, Earlwood, New South Wales.
- Samson Timothy Underwood, East Gosford, New South Wales.

Awardees are members of the Northern Territory Fire and Rescue Service who rescued a woman trapped in floodwater at Alice Springs, Northern Territory on 9 January 2010.

- Mark Raymond Charteris, Darwin, Northern Territory
- Leslie John Green, Northern Territory.

Awardees are members of the Queensland Fire and Rescue Service, a Police Officer and a community volunteer who went to the rescue of several people trapped in rising floodwater at O’Bil Bil, Queensland on 27 January 2013.

- Ashley Maeyke, Mundubbera, Queensland.
- Senior Constable Cameron John Mosley, Queensland Police Service.
- Grant Andrew Nagle, Eidsvold, Queensland.
- John O'Gorman, Eidsvold, Queensland.
- Ralph James Pointon, Eidsvold, Queensland.
- Andrew Peter Roth, Eidsvold, Queensland.

Awardees are members of the Queensland Fire and Rescue Service and the Moore Park and Bundaberg Surf Life Saving Clubs went to the rescue of three people who were trapped on a roof in floodwater at Booyan, Queensland on 27 January 2013.

- Martin Ashton Cole, Bundaberg, Queensland.
- John Davis, Moore Park Beach, Queensland.
- Julie Maree Davis, Moore Park Beach, Queensland.
- Trevor James Farraway, Bundaberg West, Queensland.
- Andrew William Smith, Bundaberg East, Queensland.
- Joanna Francis Tolvanen, Moore Park Beach, Queensland.
- Reid Linton Tucker, Moore Park Beach, Queensland.

Awardees are the crew of Ballina Marine Rescue BA30 who went to the rescue of several people after their boat capsized at Ballina, New South Wales on 15 April 2013.

- Elton Anzac Cummings, Ballina, New South Wales.
- Ben Redman, North Woodburn, New South Wales.
- Ross Maxwell Trease, Ballina, New South Wales.

Awardees are the crew of Ballina Jet Boat Surf Rescue 40 who went to the rescue of several people after their boats capsized at Ballina, New South Wales on 15 April 2013.

- Bradley James Heard, Ballina, New South Wales.
- Gary John Murphy, Ballina, New South Wales.
- Mark Anthony Puglisi, East Ballina, New South Wales.

Awardees are three family members who were caught in the Queensland floods on 10 January 2011.

- Blake Jackson Rice
- The late Donna Maree Rice
- The late Jordan Lucas Rice

Awardees are members of the Brisbane Australian Volunteer Coastguard who went to the rescue of a man from a stricken vessel during a storm at Moreton Bay, Queensland on 27 January 2013.

- Steven James Creevey, Wynnum West, Queensland.
- Steven Bruce Flemming, Rochedale, Queensland.
- Allen Penman, Wynnum North, Queensland.

Awardees are members of the Local State Emergency Service and a Police Officer who went to the rescue of a woman trapped in a vehicle in floodwater at Bonville, New South Wales on 31 March 2009.

- Athol George Dorrington, New South Wales
- Ian Douglas Gill, Coffs Harbour, New South Wales.
- Senior Constable Bradley Paul Jackson, New South Wales Police Force
- David John O'Brien, Coffs Harbour, New South Wales.

Awardees are members of the public who rescued a man from a car sinking in floodwater at Bexhill, New South Wales on 20 January 2006.

- Dale William Batchelor, South East Queensland.
- Jack Francis Burke, Lismore, New South Wales.
- Simon Patrick Cleaver, Bexhill, New South Wales.
- Robert Warren McInerney, Bexhill, New South Wales.

Awardees are members of the public who went to the rescue of two children trapped in a vehicle submerged in the Numeralla River near Cooma on 4 September 1972.

- Gavin Staney Scott, Beenleigh, Queensland.
- Henry Drury Skelton, Fullerton Cove, New South Wales.
- John Herman Windshuttle, New South Wales.

The following recipients are added to the Group Bravery Citation gazetted on 27 August 2012.
Awardees are members of the public who rescued three people from a burning vehicle at Wagga Wagga, New South Wales on 5 February 2007.

- John Dennis Gentle, Junee, New South Wales.
- Graeme Roy Guelfi, Junee, New South Wales

The following recipients are added to the Group Bravery Citation gazetted on 18 August 2014.
Awardees are members of the public who went to the rescue of a colleague trapped in flood water at Marlborough, Queensland on 2 March 2011.

- Ross Leigh Dunn, Gulliver, Queensland.
- Peter John Krogh, Gin Gin, Queensland.
