= Bravery Meeting 81 (Australia) =

The Bravery Council of Australia Meeting 81 Honours List was announced by the Governor General of Australia, Sir Peter Cosgrove, AK, MC, on 18 August 2014.

Awards were announced for the Star of Courage, the Bravery Medal, Commendation for Brave Conduct and Group Bravery Citation.

† indicates an award given posthumously.

== Star of Courage (SC) ==
Star of Courage ribbon

- Michael Nerandzic †, New South Wales

== Bravery Medal (BM) ==
Bravery Medal ribbon

- Shane James Allen, Australian Capital Territory
- Anthony Gavin Baker †, New South Wales
- Timothy Michael Bateman, Western Australia
- James Ronald Bodsworth, Australian Capital Territory
- Benjamin Luke Carroll, Queensland
- Trevor Mark Davis, Queensland
- Kasun Hasanga Fernando, Victoria
- Locke William Finch, Queensland
- Matthew Brian Holmes, Western Australia
- Kennedy Jones †, Northern Territory
- Troy Brian Jorgensen, New South Wales
- Amos John Mills, Queensland
- Colin Raymond O'Hare, Australian Capital Territory
- Ian Thomas Ryan †, New South Wales
- Michael James Ryan, Victoria
- Federal Agent Mathew Evan Seneviratne, Australian Federal Police
- Ruth Lynden Sheridan, Victoria
- Robert Allen Skewes, Queensland
- Scott Graham Smith, Queensland
- Jarrad Nathan Townley, New South Wales
- David Alan White, New South Wales
- Ishan Chathuranga Wickramathunga, Victoria

== Commendation for Brave Conduct ==
Commendation for Brave Conduct ribbon

- Angus Robert Anderson, Queensland
- Michael John Anderson, New South Wales
- Mary Maureen Barden, Victoria
- Damien Luke Berry, New South Wales
- Jacob Ryan Berry, New South Wales
- Senior Constable Damon Edward Bishop, Queensland Police
- Stephen Warwick Brandley, New South Wales
- James Angus Burge, New South Walew
- Rodney John Burnby, Western Australia
- Hassan Chahrouk, New South Wales
- Christopher James Curchill, Western Australia
- Kathleen Chchrane, New South Wales
- Constable Anne Christine Collis, Queensland Police
- Senior Constable Donald James Couper, Western Australia Police
- Stephanie Jayne Defina, Victoria
- Joshua Eason-Jones, Victoria
- Matthew Eason-Jones, Victoria
- Christopher John Fowler, Victoria
- Jake Robert Gunston, Queensland
- Homayon Hatami, Victoria
- Garry Scott Hayes, Queensland
- Anthony Thomas Haynes, United Kingdom
- Ryan Mark Higginbottom, Queensland
- David Micheal Holmes, Queensland
- Garry Colin Keir, New South Wales
- Tim James Martin, Queensland
- Madeleine Denise Matkowsky, Victoria
- Christopher Linh Nguyen, Victoria
- Leigh Parkes, New South Walre
- Senior Sergeant Michael James Pearson, APM, Queensland Police
- Peter Christopher Perkins, New South Wales
- Sergeant Neil Andrew Prest, New South Wales Police
- Wayne Richard Pritchard, Victoria
- Senior Constable Michael Rasborsek, Queensland Police
- Sandra Riemer, Queensland
- Jade Jihan Safein, New South Wales
- Alex John Sainsbury, Queensland
- Robert Shane Scott, Queensland
- Senior Constable Amit Singh, Queensland Police
- Kylie Sheree Smith, Queensland
- James Mark Stirling, New South Wales, New South Wales Ambulance
- Nathan Peter Wall, New South Wales
- Reynold Dwayne Williams, Western Australia
- Lareena May Woods, Western Australia

== Group Bravery Citation ==
Awardees are several people who assisted in the rescue of residents during the floods in Warmun, Western Australia on 13 March 2011.

- Kathleen Susan Burnsby
- Rodney John Burnby
- Christopher James Churchill
- Mr Christopher Clarke †
- Senior Constable Donald James Couper, Western Australia Police
- Tanya Maree Couper
- Julie Ann Echo
- Cecil Peter Mosquito
- Leon Pinday

Awardees are several members of the Marysville Country Fire Authority who were involved in the Victorian bushfires on 7 February 2009.

- Glen Francis Fiske
- Kellan Frederick Fiske
- Patrick Joseph Flannagan
- Christopher Michael Gleeson BM
- Michael John Gleeson
- Susan Irene Gleeson
- Travis Christopher Gleeson
- Christopher John Haden
- Mark Douglas Hamdorf
- Pauline Marion Harrow
- John Malcolm
- Roger Stewart Martin
- Stewart Wesley Potter,
- John Stephen Rarcliffe
- Richard John Uden

Awardees are several members of the public who went to the rescue of several people caught in a rip at Yeppoon, Queensland on 13 April 2012.

- Matthew Leslie Danes
- Jake Robert Gunston
- Shane Andrew Hagarty
- Michael David Higginson
- Alex John Sainsbuty
- Kylie Sheree Smith

Awardees are members of the public who went to the rescue of several people who were in difficulty in rough surf at Marcoola Beach, Queensland on 23 January 2013.

- Damon Scott Bell, Victoria
- Blake Edward Cole

Awardees are members of the public who went to the rescue of a man trapped in a submerged crane at Habana, Queensland on 10 May 2013.

- Kathleen Margaret Allen
- Peter John Price
- Andrew James Rosier
- John Steven Teske
- Micheal Shane Wallace

Awardees are members of the public who went to the rescue of a colleague trapped in flood water at Marlborough, Queensland on 2 March 2011.

- Russell James Charleston
- Gavin Wayne Fox

Awardees are several people who worked as a paramedic rescue team during the Beaconsfield mine rescue in Tasmania on 25 April 2006.

- Jude May Barnes
- Nicholas William Chapman
- Matthew James Eastham
- Gregory Edsall, ASM
- Paul John Featherstone, BM, ASM
- Ian Robert Hart
- Peter Warren James
- Graeme Robert Jones, BM, ASM
- Dr Richard Walter Morris, BM
- Daryl James Pendery
- Karen Pendery

Awardees are several people who worked as a low-intensity mine rescue team during the Beaconsfield mine rescue in Tasmania on 25 April 2006.

- Brett Henry Chalmers †
- Darren Thomas Flanghan, New South Wales
- Scott Franklin, Western Australia
- Jeremy Matthew Rowlings, New South Wales

The following awardees are added to the Group Bravery Citation awarded and gazetted on 19 March 2012.

Awardees are members of the public who went to the rescue of two girls who were trapped inside a burning house at Kelso, New South Wales on 22 July 2010.

- Kristie Clayton, New South Wales
- Amos John Mills, Queensland
