= Bravery Meeting 73 (Australia) =

The Bravery Council of Australia Meeting 73 Honours List was announced by the Governor General of Australia on 16 August 2010.

Awards were announced for the Star of Courage, the Bravery Medal, Commendation for Brave Conduct and Group Bravery Citation.
