= Bravery Meeting 77 (Australia) =

The Bravery Council of Australia Meeting 77 Honours List was announced by the Governor General of Australia on 27 August 2012.

Awards were announced for the Star of Courage, the Bravery Medal, Commendation for Brave Conduct and Group Bravery Citation.

† indicates an award given posthumously.

== Star of Courage (SC) ==
- Senior Constable Luke Alan Anderton, Victoria Police
- Clayton Trevor Giddings, New South wales

== Bravery Medal (BM) ==
- Kevin Allan Beven, Queensland
- Senior Constable Peter Graham Coleman, Queensland Police
- Petty Officer Ian Mark Davies of the Royal Australian Navy, Western Australia
- Garry Allen Durbidge, Victoria
- Paul Bronte Gatenby, New South Wales
- Raymond Reginald Gorrell †, Queensland
- Judith Therese Hennock, New South Wales
- Derek Scott Maclucas, South Australia
- Byron Alexander Masrshall, Victoria
- Detective Senior Constable Steven Murphy, Victoria Police
- Senior Constable Shane Francis Pedler, New South Wales Police
- David James Phillips, Queensland
- Timothy James Reid, New South Wales
- Able Seaman Catherine Lee Smith of the Royal Australian Navy, Western Australia
- Daryl Ian Tester, South Australia
- Fred David Whitlock, Victoria
- Senior Constable Nathan Andrew Wright, Queensland Police

== Commendation for Brave Conduct ==
- Matthew Kevin Alcock, South Australia
- Martin Maria Ancone, South Australia
- Sergeant James Leonard Ansell, Tasmania Police
- Shaun Dylon Bailey, South Australia
- Gemma Ashleigh Ball, South Australia
- Anthony John Beames, New South Wales
- Lisa Jane Bossley, New south Wales
- Mathew Kane Boyle, South Australia
- Kerby Thomas Brown, Western Australia
- John William Bryce, New South Wales
- Warrant Officer Class One Kenneth John Bullman, OAM of the Australian Army, Australian Capital Territory
- Senior Constable Stephen William Case, New South Wales Police
- Jefferey Clarke, Queensland
- Robert Cockburn, New south Wales
- Peter Anthony Collina, South Australia
- Constable Luke Edward Colquhoun, Victoria Police
- Major Patrick William Davison of the Australian Army, Queensland
- Alan David Dundas †, Queensland
- Stewart Dundas, Queensland
- Matthew Keith Dunn, Queensland
- Gary Wayne Foley, Victoria
- Russell Ian Fraser, Victoria
- Sergeant Iain Gillanders, Victoria Police
- Lieutenant Colonel Jason James Hedges, CSC of the Australian Army, Queensland
- Joseph Thomas Hickey, Tasmania
- John Francis Holland, South Australia
- Vu Phong Huynh, Victoria
- Senior Constable Michael Andrew Jessup, Queensland Police
- Tim Jones, Queensland
- Raymond Eric McMillan, South Australia
- Rupa Manimua, Northern Territory
- Rod Marsh, Queensland
- Mustafa Merdivenci, Tasmania
- Bianca Kate Mills, South Australia
- Tony Michael Morris, Victoria
- Stephen Matthew Morrissey, Queensland
- Christopher David Oates, Tasmania
- Warren Alan Page, Tasmania
- Steven Pauner †, New South Wales
- Kenneth Pesrce, New South Wales
- Matthew Thomas Pickering, South Australia
- Leading Senior Constable Sean Potocki, New South Wales Police
- Alan Terrence Rankin, New South Wales
- Philippe Ravenel, New South Wales
- Senior Constable Belinda Megan Reeves, Queensland Police
- Nathan Edward Rheinberger, New South Wales
- Naomi Nicole Roskell, New South Wales
- Senior Constable Dennis Richard Rutland, New South Wales Police
- Corporal Shawn Allan Scott of the Australian Army, New South Wales
- Peter Graham Stanton, New South Wales
- Zachary Peter Taylor-Nugent, New South Wales
- Jason Tod Tippett, New South Wales
- Warwick Todd, Victoria
- Bradley Richard Tuckwell, New South Wales
- Scott Alan Tunnie, Queensland
- Greg Norman Turner, New South Wales
- John Francis Welsh, Queensland
- Neil John Wildman, Queensland
- Stephen Philip Wiseman, Western Australia
- Tyson James Young, South Australia

== Group Bravery Citation ==
- Kevin Allan Beven, Queensland
- Fredrick Clermont, Queensland
- Peter Chevathen, Queensland
- Simeon Wilfred Jawai, Queensland
- Raylene Anne Motton, Queensland
- Ian Alfred Port, Queensland
- Judith Therese Hennock, New South Wales
- Senior Constable Shane Francis Pedler, New South Wales Police
- Graham Thompson, New South Wales
- Peter Raymond Yelland, New South Wales
- Major Patrick William Davison of the Australian Army, Queensland
- Lieutenant Brandon Coghill of the Australian Army, Queensland
- Corporal Shawn Allan Scott of the Australian Army, New South Wales
- Corporal Todd William Barnes of the Australian Army, New South Wales
- Anthony William Browne, New South Wales
- Vimal Chand Narayan, New South Wales
- Matthew William Steen, New South Wales
- Brian Anthony Evans, New South Wales
- Madeline Mary Kennedy, New South Wales
- Joshua Phillip Sharp, New South Wales
- Jason Hurst, Queensland
- Ross Terence Thorley, Queensland
- Francis Albert Smidt, New South Wales
