= Bravery Meeting 72 (Australia) =

The Bravery Council of Australia Meeting 72 Honours List was announced by the Governor General of Australia, Quentin Bryce AD, CVO on 15 March 2010.

Awards were announced for the Star of Courage, the Bravery Medal, Commendation for Brave Conduct and Group Bravery Citation.

== Star of Courage ==
Star of Courage ribbon

- Ronald Gianoncelli, Western Australia, for resisting an armed robbery
