= Bravery Meeting 70 (Australia) =

The Bravery Council of Australia Meeting 70 Honours List was announced by the Governor General of Australia on 2 March 2009.

Awards were announced for the Star of Courage, the Bravery Medal, Commendation for Brave Conduct and Group Bravery Citation.

† indicates an award made posthumously.

== Star of Courage ==
Star of Courage ribbon

- Stephen William Hyland, Queensland
- Michael Anthony Tucker, Victoria

== Bravery Medal (BM) ==
Bravery Medal ribbon

- Editha Aquino, Victoria
- Michael John Chillemi, New South Wales
- Phillip John Collins, New South Wales
- Paul Johannes de Waard, Middelburg, Netherlands
- Senior Sergeant Richard James Downie, Queensland Police
- Brian Leonard Elvery, New South Wales
- Grant James Ford, Victoria
- Stephen Oswald Foster, Queensland
- Daniel Garlick, Victoria
- Benar Giawa, Indonesia
- Sergeant Peter Thomas Gibson, New South Wales Police
- Alan James Grant, New South Wales
- Adiziduhu Harefa, Indonesia
- Motani Harefa, Indonesia
- Brendan Gerard Keilar†, Victoria
- Senior Constable John Sione Lima, Queensland Police
- Luke Luchetti, New South Wales
- Craig Meaney, New South Wales
- Barbara Joan Mitchell, Western Australia
- Seti Eli Ndruru, Indonesia
- Simon Nguyen, New South Wales
- Senior Constable Anthony Charles Rodgers, New South Wales Police
- Edward George Tamms, Western Australia
- Rodney Newman Wells, Western Australia
- Trent James West, Western Australia

== Commendation for Brave Conduct ==
Commendation for Brave Conduct ribbon

- Glendon Leigh Aitchison, Queensland
- Sergeant Gary Charles Beling, Queensland Police
- Stephen Charles Bennett, New South Wales
- Selwyn John Brown, New South Wales
- Anthony Joseph Cameron, New South Wales
- Helen June Cowan, Western Australia
- Stephen James Coward, Western Australia
- Chief Petty Officer Gary Roderick Dhu, Queensland
- Senior Constable Paul James Doherty, Queensland Police
- Peter Henry Dubois, New South Wales
- Brent Craig Eccles, Western Australia
- Samuel William Edwards, Queensland
- Paul Anthony Fitzgerald, Australian Capital Territory
- Jane Cristy Flavel, South Australia
- Mark David Flett, Australian Capital Territory
- Charlie Ricky Gafa, Victoria
- Matthew Peter Hobson, New South Wales
- Siobhan Jackson, Victoria
- Charles Lakey, Victoria
- Judith Rae McAlpine, Western Australia
- Senior Constable Daniel James McArthur, New South Wales Police
- Constable Ray Peter Noffke, New South Wales Police
- Gary Edward Pearce, New South Wales
- Jeffrey Piefke, Western Australia
- Constable Benjamin Geoffrey Radcliffe, New South Wales Police
- Duncan James Rayward, New South Wales
- Chief Inspector David Kenneth Robinson, New South Wales Police
- Michael Donald Rogan, New South Wales
- Senior Sergeant Garry John Smith, Northern Territory Police
- Senior Constable John Robert Smith, New South Wales Police
- Michael Thomas Sydes, New South Wales
- Sarah Leone Thompson, New South Wales
- Mark William Tucker, New South Wales
- Catherine Odette Vincent, Queensland
- Keslie Rose Zosars, New South Wales

== Group Bravery Citation ==
Awardees comprise the crew of the Tugboat Watagan who, on 8 June 2007, went to the assistance of the Sea Confidence during the Hunter/Central Coast Storm Emergency.

- Stephen Robert Balker
- Captain Jack De Gilio
- Paul Stephen Devereux
- Leslie Harold Handicott
- Robert William Harris
- Steven William Parker
- Jon Gregory Partridge
- George William Sewell
- Stephen Ernest Taylor

Awardees comprise the crew of the Tugboat Wickham who, on 8 June 2007, went to the assistance of the Betis during the Hunter/Central Coast Storm Emergency.

- Murray Francis Green
- Ashley Ian Hardy
- Captain Aaron Jeremiah Henshaw
- Gerard Christopher Inkston
- Michael Arthur Miners
- Captain Ian Robert Turnton
- Peter James Weary
- Thomas Pearson Wiley
