= Bravery Meeting 71 (Australia) =

The Bravery Council of Australia Meeting 71 Honours List was announced by the Governor General of Australia on 17 August 2009.

Awards were announced for the Star of Courage, the Bravery Medal, Commendation for Brave Conduct and Group Bravery Citation.

† indicates an award made posthumously.

== Star of Courage ==
Star of Courage ribbon

- Joanne Margaretha Lucas, Western Australia

== Bravery Medal (BM) ==
Bravery Medal ribbon

- Joshua William Dishton, Victoria
- Jack Ross Foster, Victoria
- Dion Grey, Victoria
- Jason Graeme Gully†, Victoria
- Moomooga Tiatia Harris, Victoria
- Daniel Chan Johnson, Queensland
- Jacqueline Johnson, Queensland
- Petty Officer Greg James Langshaw, Western Australia
- Constable Paul Thomas Mason, Queensland Police
- Chief Petty Officer Rohan Kenneth Pugh, Western Australia
- Kyle George Quinlan, Queensland
- Allan Farley Small, Victoria
- Paul Richard Udinga, Western Australia
- Xinkang Wang, New South Wales
- John Macleay West, Queensland
- Jeanette Margaret Wilkins, New South Wales
- David Kevin Williams, South Australia

== Commendation for Brave Conduct ==
Commendation for Brave Conduct ribbon

- Stewart John Atchinson, Victoria
- David John Bevan-Evans, Victoria
- Alfred Boge, Solomon Islands
- Steven Feruccio Brescacin, Western Australia
- Kent Francis Brotherton, Victoria
- Leslie Ross Burnley, Western Australia
- Pascal Cabooter, Belgium
- Sean Cavanagh, Queensland
- Mary Margaret Cosh, Queensland
- Maureen May Crawford, New South Wales
- Kenneth Sydney Dacomb, Victoria
- Ricky James Dare, Queensland
- Cossie John Doyle, Queensland
- Neale Michael Dunphy BM, Queensland
- Paul David Eustance, Northern Territory
- Mathew John Froude, Queensland
- Senior Constable Ian Frederick Goeths, Queensland Police
- Steven Lance Gunster, Western Australia
- Paul Christopher Harrington, South Australia
- Paul James Heenan, Queensland
- Robert Hirsch, Queensland
- Glen Phillip Ingram, Victoria
- Bradley John Kidd, Queensland
- John Gerard Kilduff, Victoria
- Sergeant Damion Clifford King, Northern Territory
- David Anthony King, Western Australia
- Steven Kladaric, Victoria
- Eugene Terrence Kudray, Western Australia
- Benjamin McGuire, Queensland
- Benjamin Thomas Marion, Queensland
- Senior Constable Andrew James Mayfield, New South Wales Police
- Levi Perry, Western Australia
- Ross Edward Pittit, Queensland
- James Martin Regan†, Western Australia
- Clancy Jade Roberts, New South Wales
- Michael William Russel, Queensland
- Piero Sidoti, Victoria
- Shawn Scott Thornton, New South Wales
- Senior Constable Richard Paul Wells, Western Australia Police

== Group Bravery Citation ==
Awardees are several crew members from the 35 Water Transport Squadron attached to the Australian National Antarctic Research Expedition.

- Kenneth Stanley Barrington, New South Wales
- Dudley Raymond Crowe, Victoria
- Timothy Gay, Queensland
- Gregory Dale Kenny, New South Wales
- Alistair Andrew Scott, Queensland
