= Bravery Meeting 68 (Australia) =

The Bravery Council of Australia Meeting 68 Honours List was announced by the Governor General of Australia, Major General Michael Jeffery, AC, CVO, MC on 17 March 2008.

Awards were announced for the Star of Courage, the Bravery Medal, Commendation for Brave Conduct and Group Bravery Citation.

† indicates an award given posthumously.

== Star of Courage ==
Star of Courage ribbon

- Robert Cook †, United States
- Miss Kerri-Anne O’Meley †, New South Wales
- Shane Robert Warburton, Australian Capital Territory

== Bravery Medal (BM) ==
Bravery Medal ribbon

- Senior Constable Peter Bruce Bailey, New South Wales Police Force
- Senior Constable Timothy James Brown, New South Wales Police Force
- Gregory John Flood, New South Wales
- James Ronald Foley, Victoria
- Steven James Foley †, Victoria
- Arthur John Griffiths, New South Wales
- Benjamin James Groves, New South Wales
- Clayton Ashley Harris, New South Wales
- Alex Gilbert Jimenez, New South Wales
- Constable Eric Ian Lehaney, Canada
- Senior Constable Daniela Linda Mattiuzzo, APM, Northern Territory Police
- Rachel Moore, Victoria
- Senior Constable Bradley Nathan Muddle, New South Wales Police Force
- Bevan John Roberts, New Zealand
- Senior Constable Wayne Leslie Robinson, New South Wales Police Force
- John Robert Ryan, United States
- Richard Leslie Ryan, New South Wales
- Donald Paul Smith, Queensland
- Gregory Michael Taylor, New South Wales
- John Toomey, New South Wales
- Josiah Tamata’ane Tupou, Queensland
- Sergeant Colin Patrick Woolesy, New South Wales Police Force

== Commendation for Brave Conduct ==
Commendation for Brave Conduct ribbon

- Andrew John Bartley, Queensland
- Stephen Wayne Bates, New South Wales
- Ivor Brice, New South Wales
- Travis James Brown, Queensland
- Anthony John Bunton, New South Wales
- Simon James Burnup, Western Australia
- Paul Carstairs, Victoria
- Stephen Maxwell Dowey, New South Wales
- Douglas Kenneth Finucane, New South Wales
- Senior Constable Christopher John Fowler, New South Wales Police
- Andrew Robert Gordon, New South Wales
- Sergeant Glenn Stanley Gorick, New South Wales Police
- Rodney Anthony Gray, New South Wales
- Timothy Daniel Gurry, Queensland
- Joe Benjamin Hansen, New South Wales
- Detective Senior Constable Alan Joseph Hodge, Northern Territory Police
- Constable Amanda Louise Holloway, New South Wales Police
- Paul Lindon Hoyle, Victoria
- Andrew Frederick Johnson, New South Wales
- Evan Alexander Jones, New South Wales
- Nikolas Kokotovich, New South Wales
- Neil Ian Leviston, Victoria
- Detective Senior Constable Richard William Liston, New South Wales Police
- Paul Stephen Lodge, New South Wales
- Roslyn McMaster, New South Wales
- Constable Lauren Anne McNeice, New South Wales Police
- Senior Constable Andrew James Magrath, Northern Territory Police
- Francis Lorn Mills, New South Wales
- Glen John Mitcham, New South Wales
- Kirk Scott Muir, Queensland
- Keith David O'Brien, United Kingdom
- Tim Pickworth, New South Wales
- John Edward Purcell, New South Wales
- John Bruce Robinson†, New South Wales
- Constable Louise Sayton, Northern Territory Police
- Aleksander John Searle, Victoria
- David Wayne Smith, New South Wales
- Andrew David Turnbull, Queensland
- Detective Sergeant Edmund Leonard Turner, Northern Territory Police
- Nigel Ray Wade, New South Wales
- Warren Malcolm Wilkes, New South Wales
- Evan Keith Winstanley, Queensland
- Senior Constable Leanne Joy Woolsey, New South Wales Police
- Stahy Zographakis, New South Wales

== Group Bravery Citation ==
(added to the Group Bravery Citation awarded and gazetted on 29 August 2005)
Awardees comprise personnel of the Australian Embassy in Jakarta.

- Alex Arena
