= Bravery Meeting 85 (Australia) =

The Bravery Council of Australia Meeting 85 Honours List was announced by the Governor General of Australia on 5 May 2016.

Awards were announced for the Star of Courage, the Bravery Medal, Commendation for Brave Conduct and Group Bravery Citation.

== Star of Courage (SC) ==
Star of Courage ribbon

- Nicholas William Thomson, South Australia

== Bravery Medal with Bar ==
- David Key BM, Victoria

== Bravery Medal (BM) ==
Bravery Medal ribbon

- Katie Abbott, New South Wales
- Sandro Luigi Agnoletto, Victoria
- Luke William Ashman, South Australia
- Lucas Baldwin, Victoria
- Ricky Lee Bromfield, Western Australia
- Michael William Curran, Queensland
- Lucas John Dowson, Victoria
- Mark Patrick Hickey, New South Wales
- Constable Guy Roland Lalor, Queensland Police Service
- Senior Sergeant Jeffrey Warren Lansdown, Queensland Police Service
- Brock Lawrence, New South Wales
- Christopher James Lofdahl, South Australia
- Christopher John Meacham, Victoria
- The late Leading Seaman Bradley John Meek, New South Wales
- David Edward Ellis, Queensland
- Charles Allan Mitchell, New South Wales
- Ronald Albert Morasso, New South Wales
- Bradley William Morrison, Queensland
- Lisa Dianne Morrow, Australian Capital Territory
- George Keith Picone, Victoria
- Sergeant Michael John Prickett, Queensland Police Service
- Christian Anthony Pyke, South Australia
- The late Paul Richard Rossington, New South Wales
- Sergeant Conrad Wayne van Egmond, Queensland Police Service

== Commendation for Brave Conduct ==
Commendation for Brave Conduct ribbon

- Nicholas Edward Barnett, New South Wales
- Jade-Elle Piper Brown, Queensland
- Declan Jesse Burnett, Victoria
- Daniel David Cannon, Western Australia
- Sarah Elizabeth Day, Northern Territory
- Senior Constable Michael Dietrich, New South Wales Police Force
- Rachel Elise Ehlbeck, New South Wales
- Neil Phillip Farnsworth, Victoria
- Jordan John Headrick, Queensland
- Steven David Hird, Queensland
- Desleigh Lorraine Jones, Queensland
- Senior Constable Patrick Edward Larkins, South Australia Police
- Peter James Lee, South Australia
- John Matthew McCarthy, Queensland
- Neil Andrew Maher, Australian Capital Territory
- Dr David Mills, Queensland
- Frank Nesci, Victoria
- Genene Marie O'Neill, Queensland
- Chevon Stephanie Parker, New South Wales
- Stephen Pinczi, New South Wales
- Ma'afu-Leka Okusitino Ratah, New South Wales
- Edward Daniel Reece, Australian High Commission, Fiji
- Stephen Rex Richards, Queensland
- Glenn Michael Schwartz, South Australia
- Anthony Paul Seers, Queensland
- Tyronne Shaquille Taukamo, New South Wales
- David Joseph Wood, New South Wales

== Group Bravery Citation ==
Awardees are members of the public and Queensland Police, Fire and Ambulance Services who assisted in the rescue of a driver from a chemical laden truck which had crashed at Angellala Creek, Charleville. Queensland on 5 September 2014.

- Jimmy Wayne Bateman
- Timothy John Bunyan
- Constable Logan Tristan De Costa, Queensland Police Service
- Senior Constable Mark Patrick Everitt,Queensland Police Service
- John Norman Gilbert
- Peter Robert Hackwood
- Michael Bradley Hadj
- Senior Constable Kenric Robert Head, Queensland Police Service
- Inspector Stephen Edwin Kersley, Queensland Police Service
- Clinten Thomas McCarthy
- Senior Constable Judith Heather McGrath, Queensland Police Service
- Senior Sergeant Adrian Paul Reick, Queensland Police Service
- Jake Paul Sullivan
- Nathan James Thompson
- Liam Colin Walsh

Awardees are members of the public and Queensland Police who rescued a man from a burning house at Upper Mount Gravatt, Queensland on 2 May 2015.

- Teimoor Amin
- Matthew Lucas Greenhalgh
- Michael Hayes
- Samuel Elijah Hirvi
- Senior Constable Basil Gilbert van Dongen, Queensland Police Service

Awardees are members of the public and Queensland Police who went to the assistance of a driver when his semi-trailer overturned at Rockhampton, Queensland on 4 January 2010.

- Senior Constable Dean Magarry, Queensland Police Service
- Senior Constable Megan Leanne Magarry BM
- Hannah Louise Nugent

Awardees are members of the public and Queensland Police who went to the assistance of a man who was trapped in an overturned truck at Bald Hills, Queensland on 9 September 2013.

- Acting Sergeant Kerrianne Maree Edwards, Queensland Police Service
- Senior Constable Matthew John Grace, Queensland Police Service
- Riley Heather Lye
- Senior Constable Michael John McGahan, Queensland Police Service
- Senior Constable Alan Gregory Montgomery,Queensland Police Service
- Senior Constable Kurt Norman Mudgeway, Queensland Police Service
- Alan James Staines

Awardees are members of Queensland Police who assisted in the apprehension of a man armed with two knives at Dalby, Queensland on 29 November 1997.

- Gregory David Drain
- Senior Constable Peter Anthony Horn, Queensland Police Service
- Senior Constable Ian Gregory Potter, Queensland Police Service

Awardees are members of the public and Queensland Police who assisted in the rescue of people from a mini bus trapped in flood waters at Kallangur, Queensland on 1 May 2015.

- Sergeant Ian Robert Grafton? Queensland Police Service
- Brian Thomas Keogh
- Senior Constable Robert James Rafferty, Queensland Police Service
- Mark John Saunders

Awardees are members of the public who assisted in the rescue and evacuation of a group of skiers following an avalanche on Maedake Mountain, Aomori, Japan on 14 February 2007.

- David Gerard Brown
- Roger Gordon Campbell
- The late Jonathan Keith Disher
- Glenn Geoffrey Kirkwood
- Ross Philip McSwiney
- Mark Hounsell Spilsbury
- David Ross Stewart-Thomson
