= Bravery Meeting 83 (Australia) =

The Bravery Council of Australia Meeting 83 Honours List was announced by the Governor General of Australia, Sir Peter Cosgrove on 19 August 2015.

Awards were announced for the Star of Courage, the Bravery Medal, Commendation for Brave Conduct and Group Bravery Citation.

== Star of Courage (SC) ==
Star of Courage ribbon

For acts of conspicuous courage in circumstances of great peril.
- The late Pilot Officer James Wallace Hocking – Queensland.

== Bravery Medal (BM) ==
Bravery Medal ribbon

For acts of bravery in hazardous circumstances.
- Mustafa Ruhi Akkan – Sydney, New South Wales
- Murray Charles Barnewall – Port Campbell, Victoria.
- Senior Constable Benjamin Douglas Bjarnesen – Queensland Police Service
- Elissa Marie Clarke – Adelaide, South Australia.
- Assistant Commissioner Michael James Condon APM – Queensland Police Service.
- Ashley Ryan Coster – Cloverlea, Victoria.
- Timothy Shaun Coster – Cloverlea, Victoria.
- Jackson Douglas Hillier – Bonbeach, Victoria.
- Soichi Kawabata – Victoria.
- Senior Sergeant Peter Gerhard Liebig – Queensland Police Service.
- Brendan Lys – Queensland.
- Jai McKneil – Gladstone, Queensland.
- Senior Sergeant Christopher Maskell – Queensland Police Service.
- Ryan Alexander Nally – Queensland.
- Senior Constable Nigel Ross O'Keefe – Queensland Police Service.
- Senior Sergeant Michael James Pearson APM – Queensland Police Service.
- Nattapat Penpanussak – Annandale, New South Wales.
- The late Senior Constable David James Rixton – New South Wales Police Force
- Thomas James Smith – Cloverlea, Victoria.
- Aleziah Spiers – South Australia.
- Jamie Alan Strong – Berry, New South Wales.
- Constable Cameron Wallace – Victoria Police
- Senior Constable Joel Michael Whittred – Queensland Police Service.
- Leading Senior Constable Jenny Ann Wiltshire – Victoria Police.
- Joseph Zaghini – Severnlea, Victoria.

== Commendation for Brave Conduct ==
For acts of bravery considered worthy of recognition

Commendation for Brave Conduct ribbon

- Senior Constable Teresa Elizabeth Anderson – Queensland Police Service.
- Senior Constable Shane Grey Ashton – Queensland Police Service.
- Constable Megan Jane Brunton – Queensland Police Service.
- Mario Casa – Oakleigh South, Victoria.
- Daniel Luke Coster – Cloverlea, Victoria.
- Robert Edward Coster – Cloverlea, Victoria.
- William Edward Denny – Rostrevor, South Australia.
- Robin Jeffrey Everden – Molloy Island, Western Australia.
- Lieutenant Colonel Graham Malcolm Goodwin – South Australia.
- Dylan Reece Hodge – Rockhampton, Queensland.
- Michael William Jones – New South Wales
- Jeffrey Edward Jorgensen – Springfield Lakes, Queensland.
- Jeremy Adrian Linton – Montrose, Victoria
- Andrew James Lock OAM – Canberra, Australian Capital Territory.
- Mark Anthony McCarthy – Collie, Western Australia.
- Alan Robert Milner – Strathfieldsaye, Victoria.
- Senior Constable Leonard Joseph Moroney – Queensland Police Service.
- John Arron North – Kings Park, Victoria.
- Adrian James Pendergast – Eight Mile Plains, Queensland.
- Salvatore Raciti – Melbourne, Victoria.
- Robert William Starbuck – Doreen, Victoria.
- Carter Davis Travis – Queensland.
- Bruce Richard Waldron – Coooibah, Queensland.

== Group Bravery Citation ==
For a collective act of bravery, by a group of persons in extraordinary circumstances, that is considered worthy of recognition.

Awardees are three members of the Marine Rescue, Ballina who went to the rescue of two people after their boat failed in turbulent water at Ballina, New South Wales on 15 April 2013.
- Rodney Hugh Guest – East Ballina, New South Wales.
- Tony Brian Handcock – Ballina, New South Wales.
- David Jamieson Nockolds – Ballina, New South Wales.
Awardees are members and former members of Queensland Police who removed a suspected explosive from an offender at Logan, Queensland on 2 November 1998.
- Detective Senior Constable Peter John Bowser – Queensland Police Service.
- Assistant Commissioner Michael James Condon APM – Queensland Police Service.
- Senior Sergeant Peter Gerhard Liebig – Queensland Police Service.
- Senior Sergeant Michael James Pearson APM – Queensland Police Service.
- Sergeant Paul David Williams – Queensland Police Service.
- Joseph Zaghini – Servernlea, Queensland.
Awardees are three members of Queensland Police and a member of the public who entered a burning unit in search of a man at Roma, Queensland on 28 October 2012.
- Senior Constable Benjamin Douglas Bjarnesen – Queensland Police Service
- Senior Constable Michael Charles Hewitt – Queensland Police Service.
- Constable Stuart Benjamin Mitcheley – Queensland Police Service.
- James Charles Perren – Queensland.
Awardees are four members of Queensland Police who rescued an elderly woman from a stricken vessel in the flooded Burnett River at Bundaberg, Queensland on 26 January 2013.
- Detective Senior Constable Jon Allan Murray.
- Constable Brent James Schultz.
- Senior Constable Donita Maree Stains
- Senior Constable Ryan Barry Thompson.
Awardees are members of Queensland Police who were ambushed and fired upon while attending a neighbourhood dispute at West Chermside, Queensland on 1 May 2000.
- Senior Sergeant Daryl Elliott Green.
- Senior Constable Sharnelle Patricia Harris.
- Sergeant Christopher John Mulhall.

Sergeant Brett Andrew Price.

Awardees are members of staff who prevented several mental health patients from leaving a Hospital in Queensland on 19 January 2013.
- Richard Vincent Ashton – Toowoomba, Queensland.
- Geo Parakalayil George – Ooralea, Queensland.
- Duncan Grills – Queensland.
- Linda Susan Herbertson – Murphy's Creek, Queensland.
- Thomas James McGovern – Toowoomba, Queensland.
- Thomas Mathew – Glenvale, Queensland.
