= Bravery Meeting 80 (Australia) =

List of awards

The Bravery Council of Australia Meeting 80 Honours List was announced by the Governor General of Australia, the then Quentin Bryce, AC, CVO, on 24 March 2014.

Awards were announced for the Star of Courage, the Bravery Medal, Commendation for Brave Conduct and Group Bravery Citation.

† indicates an award given posthumously.

== Star of Courage (SC) ==
Star of Courage ribbon

- Andrew MacDONALD, New South Wales

== Bravery Medal (BM) ==
Bravery Medal ribbon

- Mrs Leanne Gayle BARBER, New South Wales
- Senior Constable Darryl Roderick CAMPBELL, Queensland Police
- Detective Inspector Darren John CLOAKE New South Wales Police
- Rowan Anthony CUTBUSH, New South Wales
- John Edward DAVIES, Victoria
- William Thomas DENNY, AM, South Australia
- Bradley David DRAPER, Queensland
- Damian Simon HALL, Victoria
- Rodney Charles HOWARD, New South Wales
- Charlton William KABLE †, New South Wales
- Mark John McNICOL, New South Wales
- Daniel Martin RACE, Western Australia
- David RADCLIFFE, Queensland
- Daniel REBBECHI, Western Australia

== Commendation for Brave Conduct ==
Commendation for Brave Conduct ribbon

- Mrs Connie Teresa BORG, Victoria
- Senior Sergeant David George BRAY, Tasmania Police
- Stephen Francis CORCORAN, Queensland
- James Michael DINGLE, Queensland
- Sergeant John Paul GOMES, New South Wales Police
- Corporal Kim Elizabeth GRAY, Australian Army
- Graham Duncan HARTWIG, Queensland
- Rodney Duncan HARTWIG, Queensland
- Dean Edward HUDSON, New South Wales
- Robert Stanley KEARNEY, South Australia
- Miss Elise Nicole LAVERS, South Australia
- Senior Constable Drew Alexander LEWIS, Queensland Police
- Thomas Peter McPEAKE, South Australia
- Miss Terry McPHERSON, Queensland
- Mandeep NAGRA, Queensland
- Detective Leading Senior Constable Marc Anthony NEWTON, Victoria Police
- Zachary John O'LEARY-BARLOW, Western Australia
- Glen OLERENSHAW, New South Wales
- Duncan James ROGERS, Victoria
- Corporal Scott Robert RUEHLAND, Australian Army
- Mrs Sharon Maree VAUGHAN, Queensland
- Brett Leslie WILLIAMS, Queensland

== Group Bravery Citation ==
Awardees are two people who took action following a collision between two heavy vehicles, at Myalup, Western Australia on 11 December 2012.

- Brian Ugo DELL'AGOSTINO, Western Australia
- Mrs Lynette Amy GILBERT, Western Australia

Awardees are several people who rescued two women from being set alight at Daleys Point, New South Wales on 5 April 2013.

- Jarrod Carl LYMBURNER, Queensland
- Jordon REMFREY, Queensland

Awardees are several people who rescued a boy who fell over a waterfall at Devils Thumb, near Mossman, Queensland on 17 August 2008.

- Sam GIBSON, Queensland
- Matthew Aaron WERNER, (State not disclosed)

Awardees are members from the Goolwa Country Fire Service who rescued a woman trapped in floodwater at Finniss, South Australia on 27 July 2012.

- Andrew John GABELL, South Australia
- Cory John JOHNSON, South Australia
- Thomas Peter McPEAKE, South Australia
- Kenneth Roger SMIRKE, South Australia
- Paul John THURKLE, South Australia
- Amos Bradley ZADOW, South Australia

Awardees are the Australian Defence Force helicopter crew, from Warhorse 104, involved in the rescue of several people trapped in floodwaters at Bundaberg, Queensland on 28 January 2013.

- Corporal Kim Elizabeth GRAY, Australian Army
- Captain Robert William JONES, Australian Army
- Corporal Matthew Paul KENNEDY, Australian Army
- Captain Dion PALMER, Australian Army

Awardees are the Australian Defence Force helicopter crew, from Warhorse 214, involved in the rescue of several people trapped in floodwaters at Bundaberg, Queensland on 28 January 2013

- Captain Rex David CURTIS, Australian Army
- Corporal Brett Arthur HOY, Australian Army
- Captain David Dennis REES, Australian Army
- Corporal Scott Robert RUEHLAND, Australian Army

Awardees are members of the Australian Defence Force and Customs and Border Protection personnel who were involved in the rescue of forty-one people when a suspected illegal entry vessel impacted the rocks at Rocky Point, Christmas Island on 15 December 2010.

- Daniel Ronald BLACKBURN, Queensland
- Michael Terence BURGESS, Western Australia
- Troy Adam DANIELS, Queensland
- Leading Seaman Mitchell Scott DAVIDSON, Royal Australian Navy
- Lieutenant Jeremy Michel EVAIN, RAN, Royal Australian Navy
- Graham John GOURLAY, Queensland
- Private Dane Robert HEINEMANN, Australian Army
- Leading Seaman Adam Daniel HUBBARD, Royal Australian Navy
- Paul Michael JARDINE, Queensland
- Chief Petty Officer Raymond Charles MANLEY, Royal Australian Navy
- Brett Patrick MARMONT, New South Wales
- Private Kale Raymond MORRISSEY, Australian Army
- Leading Seaman Shannon MUNDY-CASTLE, Royal Australian Navy
- Able Seaman Cory James ROBERTS, Royal Australian Navy
- Leigh RULE, South Australia
- Able Seaman Jake Andrew SMITH, Royal Australian Navy
- Private Samuel Kurt WILLIAMSON-ROBERTSON, Australian Army

Awardees are several police officers who took actions as bushfires threatened residents in Heathcote, New South Wales on 26 December 2001.

- Bernard James DOYLE, New South Wales
- Senior Constable Mathew John DREVERMAN, New South Wales Police
- Senior Constable Kelvin Roy MADDALENA, New South Wales Police
- Senior Constable Jamie David OLIVER, New South Wales Police
- Sergeant Andrew Paul SETTER, New South Wales Police
- Sergeant Christopher YORK, New South Wales Police

Awardees are several people who assisted during the rescue of several children who were swept out to sea at Patonga Beach, New South Wales on 12 January 2013.

- James BILLINGTON, New South Wales
- Chadd William HOFNER, New South Wales
- Liam John PETTIT, New South Wales
- Clint PILLING, New South Wales

Awardee is a member of Queensland Fire and Rescue Service who conducted rescue operations in Toowoomba during the Queensland Floods in January 2011

- David Robert Crighton, Queensland Fire and Rescue Service
