= Bravery Meeting 75 (Australia) =

The Bravery Council of Australia Meeting 75 Honours List was announced by the Governor General of Australia on 22 August 2011.

Awards were announced for the Star of Courage, the Bravery Medal, Commendation for Brave Conduct and Group Bravery Citation.

== Star of Courage (SC) ==
- Lorraine Casey, Victoria
- Charles Zerafa, Tasmania

== Commendation for Brave Conduct ==
- Timothy Arnold, New South Wales
- Anthony Ayres, Queensland
- Shane Brown, Victoria
- Senior Constable Cameron Caine, Victoria Police
- Dan Campbell, New South Wales
- Benjamin Carroll, Queensland
- Glen Damro, Queensland
- Frank Engels, Victoria
- Ricky French, Tasmania
- Steven Gatenby, Queensland
- John Granger, Queensland
- Nicholas Gregorski, Queensland
- Robert Grimson, New South Wales
- Scott Hahne, Queensland
- Arthur Harris, New South Wales
- Peter Hocking, New South Wales
- Darren Horne, Victoria
- Senior Constable Kerri Johnson, Queensland Police
- Senior Constable Daniel Jones, Victoria Police
- Enes Kaya, Western Australia
- Aaron Kell, New South Wales
- Detective Constable Grant Lutz, Queensland Police
- Samantha Marshall, Queensland
- Peter Newall, Tasmania
- Carl Niki, New South Wales
- Constable Bernard Nyhan, Queensland Police
- Thomas Reeve, New South Wales
- Nicholas Sherry, New South Wales
- Senior Constable Mark Simpson, Queensland Police
- Jennifer Small, New South Wales
- Senior Constable Ian Thompson, Victoria Police
- Senior Constable Adrian Venz, Queensland Police
- Leading Senior Constable Roger Wood, Victoria Police
- Slavica Zdravavkovic, Victoria

== Group Bravery Citation ==
- Darren Evans, Queensland
- Darren Simpson, Queensland
- Mark Steffen, Queensland
- Adrian Williams, Queensland
