= Bravery Meeting 67 (Australia) =

The Bravery Council of Australia Meeting 67 Honours List was announced by the Governor General of Australia, Major General Michael Jeffery, AC, CVO, MC on 20 August 2007.

Awards were announced for the Bravery Medal, Commendation for Brave Conduct and Group Bravery Citation.

== Bravery Medal (BM) ==
Bravery Medal ribbon

- Timothy Gordon Baigrie, Queensland
- Russell Norman Crow, Victoria
- Senior Constable Roland Curll, New South Wales Police Force
- Miss Laura Megan Daley, Queensland
- Inspector Paul James Devaney, New South Wales Police Force
- Senior Constable Nicholas James Donald, Victoria Police
- Senior Constable Michael James Folvig, Victoria Police
- Detective Sergeant Andrew John Forster, New South Wales Police Force
- Constable Adam Colin Hartley, Queensland Police
- John Carlos Henry, New South Wales
- James Michael O’Brien, Victoria
- Keith Walter Sewell, New South Wales
- Robert Arthur Smith, New South Wales
- Detective Senior Constable David Paul Stuart, New South Wales Police Force

== Commendation for Brave Conduct ==
Commendation for Brave Conduct ribbon

- Nicholas Aatkins, Victoria
- Senior Constable Martin Graham Clifton, South Australia Police
- Ms Helen Elizabeth Condie, New South Wales
- Michael William Francis, New South Wales
- Parinda Kraiwit
- Constable Mathew Thomas McDougall, New South Wales Police Force
- Constable Rob McMahon, New South Wales Police Force
- Robert Allen Matulick, South Australia
- Aaron James Scott, South Australia
- Robert Angus Scott, New Zealand

== Group Bravery Citation ==
Awardees comprise members of New South Wales Police Force and members of the public who in the early hours of the morning of 6 March 2003, assisted in attempting to rescue occupants from a burning car involved in a single vehicle accident at Beacon Hill, New South Wales.

- Inspector Paul James Devaney, New South Wales Police Force
- Roger Louis Ehret
- Sergeant Graeme Hallett, New South Wales Police Force
- Senior Constable Todd Michael Halliday, New South Wales Police Force
- Constable Brian Milos Laurich, New South Wales Police Force
- Miss Marguerite Mary McKinnon
- Constable Michael Jeffrey Ridgeway
- Keith Walter Sewell
- Robert Arthur Smith
- Constable Bradley David Thompson, BM, New South Wales Police Force
- Detective Senior Constable Cara Walls, New South Wales Police Force

Awardees comprise members of the Volunteer Marine Rescue vessel, Rescue One, who on 22 April 2006 rescued sailors from an overturned fishing vessel at Thud Point, Queensland.

- Peter John Graham
- Leslie George Mohoupt
- Steven George Rehn
