= Bravery Meeting 79 (Australia) =

The Bravery Council of Australia Meeting 79 Honours List was announced by the Governor General of Australia, the then Quentin Bryce, AC, CVO, on 1 September 2013.

Awards were announced for the Bravery Medal, Commendation for Brave Conduct and Group Bravery Citation.

† indicates an award made posthumously.

== Bravery Medal (BM) ==
Bravery Medal ribbon

- Sergeant Dean Francis BRIESE, Northern Territory Police
- Sergeant Daniel John BURGESS, Victoria Police
- Scott Nicholas BUTLER, New South Wales
- Lance Corporal Andrew Joseph FENECH, Australian Army
- Jamie Scott FERGUSON, Queensland
- Brooke Ann FOGARTY, New South Wales
- Daniel GRULKE, New South Wales
- Michael Kenneth HALL, Western Australia
- Constable Sean Malcolm HANLON, Queensland Police
- Katherine HILDER, Western Australia
- Matthew William HOWARD, Victoria
- Heather Louise KING, Western Australia
- Simon Joshua LEWIS, New South Wales
- Sally Lu McALPINE, Western Australia
- Warren William McERLEAN, Queensland
- Senior Constable Joshua Dylan PEACH, Tasmania Police
- Sean Gary ROBERTS, Western Australia
- James Marlon RUSSELL, New South Wales
- Antonino SCIDONE, Western Australia
- Jason Bryce STONE, Victoria
- Jo-Anne URQUHART, Western Australia

== Commendation for Brave Conduct ==
Commendation for Brave Conduct ribbon

- Christopher John ANGWIN, Victoria
- Robert Vincent BARRON, Queensland
- Darren George BATES, Norfolk Island
- Senior Firefighter Corrie James BENSON, Queensland Fire and Rescue Service
- Rosalie Michelle BRADES, Western Australia
- Dean Laurent BURRELL, Norfolk Island
- Timothy John BUSHELL-HAZELL, South Australia
- Gregory James DARLINGTON, Queensland
- Joan Marion DARLINGTON, Queensland
- Ryan Donald HOUSTON, Western Australia
- Coel Kenneth IBBERTSON, Queensland
- Scott JAMES, New South Wales
- Michael Thomas KENNEDY, New South Wales
- Peter John LUCAS, New South Wales
- Senior Constable Brigitte Ann MANNING-JONES, Queensland Police
- Graham William PAGDEN, New South Wales
- Steven Samual PRICE, Queensland
- Senior Constable Daven Bruce RICHARDS, Queensland Police
- Senior Constable Bill Leslie RICHARDSON, Victoria Police
- William Bruce RILEY, Queensland
- Detective Sergeant Peter John ROBSON-PETCH, Queensland Police
- Jason Dale ROFF, Australian Capital Territory
- Jodie Marie ROFF, Australian Capital Territory
- Ronald Lloyd SCHEUERLE, Queensland
- Station Officer Bernard William TRACEY, Queensland
- Sam Ash-Lee TWEEDALE, Queensland
- Danica Lea Van den BOGERT, Western Australia
- Harley Paul WALLIS, New South Wales
- Doctor Joe William WEIR, Queensland
- Senior Constable Kristie WILLIAMS, Queensland Police
- Brendan William WINTER, Queensland

== Group Bravery Citation ==
Awardees are several members from the Bedfordale Voluntary Bushfire Brigade, involved in fire-fighting operations in the RoleystoneKelmscott area during bushfires in February 2011.

- Michael Kenneth HALL, Western Australia
- Alexander Bernard LEACH, Western Australia
- Michael Raymond McCAVANAGH, Western Australia
- Mark Anthony PUTTICK, Western Australia
- Antonino SCIDONE, Western Australia
- Stephen Edward SMITH, New South Wales

Awardees are several members of the Marysville SES who assisted with the evacuation of residents during the Victorian Bushfires in February 2009.

- David Brandon BARTON, Victoria
- Jennifer Anne BARTON, Victoria
- Josephine Ann HUNTER, Victoria
- Thomas Mark PEART, Victoria
- Keith David RAY, Victoria
- Ian Jeffrey WALTERS, Victoria

Awardees are members of the public who rescued a man from a burning vessel in Denham, Western Australia on 29 November 2011.

- George Ernest DIX, Western Australia
- Justin HEWITT, Western Australia
- Ronald David MARQUIS, Western Australia

Awardees are voluntary members of the Kinglake Community Emergency Response Team who responded to emergency incidents during the Victorian bushfires in February 2009.

- Ian James DUNELL, Victoria
- Victoria Lee DUNELL ASM, Victoria
- Bartholomew WUNDERLICH, Victoria

Awardees are members of the Reefton Country Fire Authority involved in fire-fighting operations during the Victorian bushfires in February 2009.

- Danny James BENNETT, Victoria
- Rachel Lee BENNETT, Victoria
- Andrew Jeramie McDONALD, Victoria
- Ross Edward MINIFIE, Victoria
- Kathleen Marie TILLEY, Victoria

Awardees are crew members of sail boat TryBooking.com, who rescued sailors from a stricken vessel during the Melbourne to Port Fairy ocean race 2012

- Grant David DUNOON, Victoria
- Klaus-Peter FECHT, Victoria
- Gordon Ross FISHER, Victoria
- Kimberley John WALKER, Victoria

Awardees are members of the public who rescued several people caught in a rip at Urquhart Bluff beach on 22 January 2012.

- Luke Connell BEAZLEY, Victoria
- Angus Harker JOHNSON, Victoria
- Benjamin James PANNELL, Victoria
- Jason Richard PHIELER, Victoria

Awardees are members of the public who rescued two people from a submerged vehicle at Broadbeach Waters, Queensland on 10 June 2012.

- John CHAMBERS, Queensland
- Evan Dougald DALTON, Queensland
- Tanya Maree MATHEWS, Queensland
- Steven Samual PRICE, Queensland

Awardees are three young boys who went to the assistance of a girl from an offender at Palm Island, Queensland on 12 May 2011.

- Harry Frederick FRIDAY, Palm Island
- Ralph Paul HUGHES, Palm Island
- Carey Lenny NUGENT, Palm Island

Awardees are Royal Australian Navy personnel involved in the winch rescue of a man from floodwaters at Laidley Creek during the Queensland floods on 11 January 2011.

- Commander Scott Christopher PALMER,
- Lieutenant Simon Paul DRIESSEN,
- Chief Petty Officer Kerwyn Louis BALLICO,
- Petty Officer Nicholas Edward ANDERSON,

Awardee assisted of members of the Queensland Police Public Safety Response Team who conducted rescue operations during the Queensland Floods in the Lockyer Valley in January 2011.

- Anthony James ALTHAUS, Queensland
