= Bravery Meeting 74 (Australia) =

The Bravery Council of Australia Meeting 74 Honours List was announced by the Governor General of Australia on 21 March 2011.

Awards were announced for the Bravery Medal, Commendation for Brave Conduct and Group Bravery Citation.
