= Bravery Meeting 69 (Australia) =

The Bravery Council of Australia Meeting 69 Honours List was announced by the Governor General of Australia, Major General Michael Jeffery, AC, CVO, MC on 25 August 2008.

Awards were announced for the Bravery Medal and Commendation for Brave Conduct.

† indicates an award made posthumously.

== Bravery Medal (BM) ==
Bravery Medal ribbon

- Tony Paul Aubeck
- Victor Douglas Batson
- Richard Anthony Cooper
- Constable David James Crawford, New South Wales Police
- Samir El Haouli
- Terry Barry Goodman
- Ian Peter Gunn
- Henry Hill
- Fergus Butle Jackson
- Martin James Langham
- Benjamin John Lee
- Tu-Vinh Ly †
- Patrick Ray Morgan
- Andrew John Mortimer
- Trevor Richard Oliver
- Billel Ouaida
- Master Ibrahim Ouaida †
- John Percival Partridge
- Glen Richard Pickford
- Brian David Smith
- Senior Constable Paul Smith, New South Wales Police
- Senior Constable Paul Thompson, New South Wales Police

== Commendation for Brave Conduct ==
Commendation for Brave Conduct ribbon

- Amme Louisa Batson
- Senior Constable David Brooker, New South Wales Police
- Patrick Richard Byrne
- Roger Roy Cullinan
- Michael John Greentree
- Tommy Raymon Hair
- Senior Constable Michael Douglas McCormack, New South Wales Police
- Maria Ivy Mangcoy
- Thomas Mitchell †
- Brett Edward Nicholls
- Joel Leslie Poole
- James Rivers
- Elias Touma Rizkalla
- Constable Robert Lawrence Sasagi, New South Wales Police
- Sergeant Christopher Daniel Shaw, Queensland Police
- John Miller Sim
- Michael Jason Thompson
- John Andrew Timos
