= King Charles III Coronation Medal =

Commemorative medal awarded by Charles III

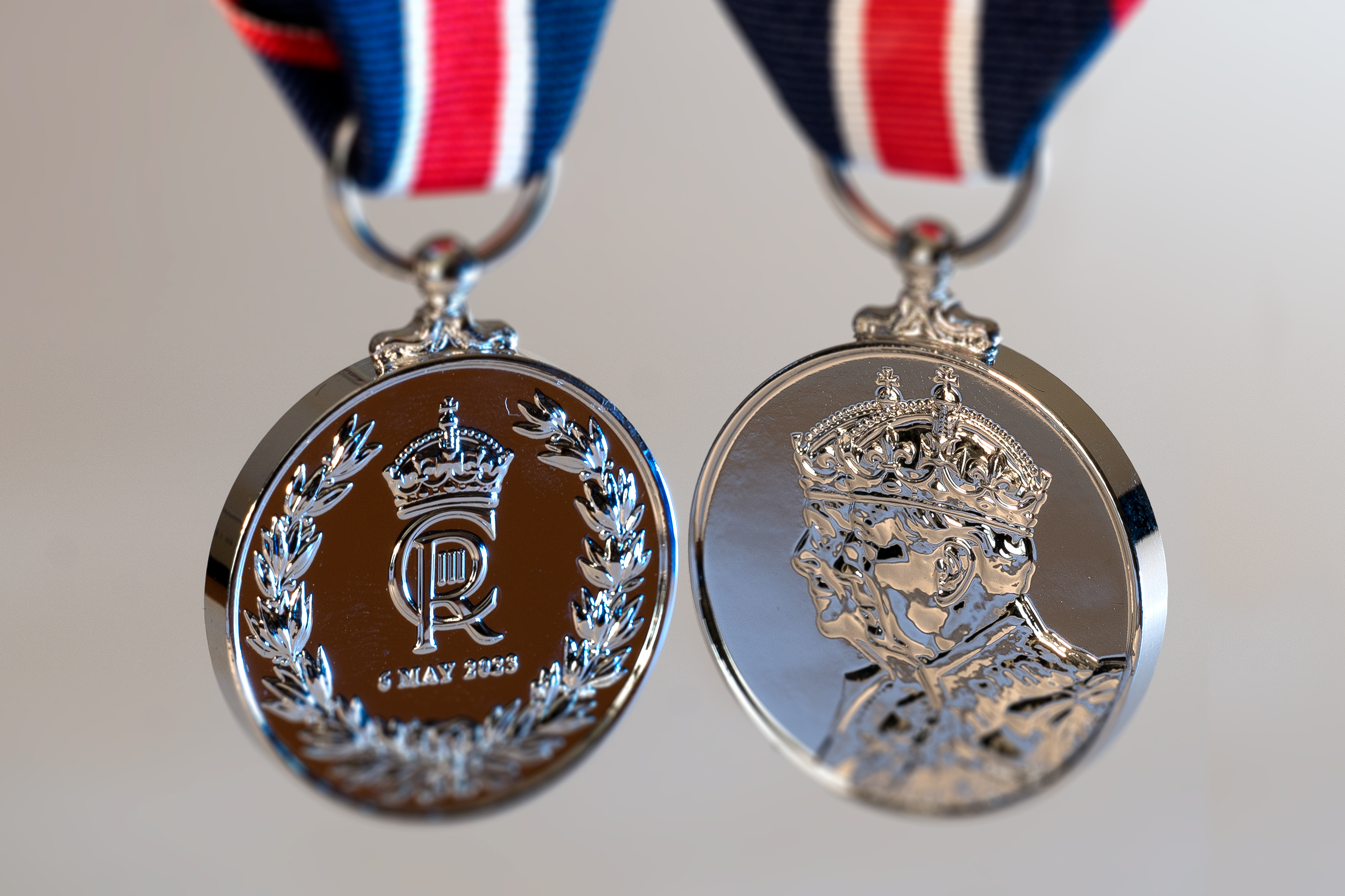
- Reverse and obverse (British medal)
- Type: Commemorative medal
- Awarded for: Community contribution
- Presented by: King Charles III
- First award: 2023 (British medal); 2024 (Canadian medal)

Highlights
- Total: More than 400,000 British medals (Note: British medals were awards administered by the United Kingdom, although were also awarded to other nationals, including Australians, Canadians, Jamaicans, and New Zealanders.); 30,000 Canadian medals
- Ribbon bar

The King Charles III Coronation Medal (French: médaille du couronnement du roi Charles III) is a commemorative medal created to mark the coronation of King Charles III and Queen Camilla, which took place on 6 May 2023.

The UK issued more than 400,000 coronation medals, awarded to individuals who contributed to the coronation, recipients of the UK's highest honours, and select British military personnel, frontline emergency workers, and public prison service staff with five years of service. The British coronation medal was awarded to Britons as well as select individuals from other Commonwealth realms.

Canada issued 30,000 coronation medals, awarding them to select members of the Canadian Armed Forces and Public Service, as well as individuals who made significant contributions to the country or achieved accomplishments that brought credit to Canada.

The British and Canadian medals are both made of nickel silver and have identical ribbons. However, the two medal designs differ. The British medal features effigies of both the King and Queen (left profiles), while the Canadian medal only features the King (right profile). On the reverse, the British medal has laurels, the royal cypher, and the Tudor Crown, whereas the Canadian medal displays the Canadian royal cypher with the Canadian Royal Crown over a sunburst design.

== British medal ==
=== Design ===
The medals are made of nickel silver and were issued by Worcestershire Medal Service. The effigy on the obverse face designed by Martin Jennings, while the reverse was designed by Phil McDermott of the Worcestershire Medal Service.

The obverse features a crowned effigy of the King Charles III and Queen Camilla facing left. The reverse shows the royal cypher CIIIR surmounted by the Tudor Crown, a laurel wreath and the date of the coronation, 6 May 2023.

The medal's ribbon is 32 millimetres (1.3 in) in width and includes a red stripe in the centre, with white stripes on each side, followed by dark blue stripes, and then red edge stripes. The design of the ribbon is inspired by the ribbon used for the 1902 King Edward VII Coronation Medal. The ribbon is one of the few design elements which are identical between the British and Canadian medals.

=== Eligibility ===
More than 400,000 medals were distributed. Those who received the medal include:

- Individuals who actively contributed to the official coronation events in Westminster Abbey and processions, and other officially recognised ceremonial Coronation events.
- Serving members of the Armed Forces who had completed five full calendar years of service on 6 May 2023 or participated in Armed Forces Coronation events during the course of 2023.
- Frontline emergency personnel who had been in paid service, retained or in a voluntary capacity, dealing with emergencies as part of their conditions of service, and who had completed five full calendar years of service on 6 May 2023;
- Publicly employed prison services personnel who had completed five full calendar years of service on 6 May 2023.
- Living individual recipients of the Victoria Cross (including Commonwealth versions) and the George Cross (including equivalents such as the Australian Cross of Valour).

==== Australians ====
Several Australians were awarded the coronation medal administered by the United Kingdom as a personal gift from the King. Its conferment was a decision of the Buckingham Palace, not that of the Australian Government, although the Australian Government indicated that it had "no objection" prior to its conferment to Australians. This followed past practices for awarding coronation and jubilee medals to Australians.

Recipients include individuals that were awarded one of Australia's highest honours, the Victoria Cross, the Victoria Cross for Australia, George Cross or the Cross of Valour. They include:

- Keith Payne VC AM
- Corporal Mark Donaldson VC
- Daniel Keighran VC
- Ben Roberts-Smith VC MG
- Michael Pratt GC
- Victor Boscoe CV
- Timothy Britten CV
- Richard Joyes CV
- Allan Sparkes CV OAM
- Darrell Tree CV

The 60 Australian Defence Force (ADF) members who participated in the King's coronation procession to Buckingham Palace were awarded the medal. The Earl of Loudoun was also conferred the medal for his role in the coronation ceremony.

Three recipients were presented the medal at Government House, Brisbane on 2 May 2024. Another presentation ceremony for these recipients also took place at Government House, Perth on 27 June 2024. Additional ADF personnel were presented the medal by the British High Commissioner to Australia, Victoria Treadell, during a ceremony in November 2024.

==== Canadians ====
Members of the Canadian Coronation Contingent who took part in the coronation events in London were awarded the British coronation medal, having been approved for wear by Canada. Other participants who received the medal includes the Canadian delegation's official flag bearer, Jeremy Hansen, and two Regina Symphony Orchestra musicians who formed part of the orchestra during the coronation ceremony.

Contingent members who received the British coronation medal are ineligible to be nominated for the Canadian coronation medal.

==== Jamaicans ====
Select members of the Jamaica Defence Force were conferred the medal in 2025, with recipients including individuals who took part in the coronation.

==== New Zealanders ====
Some New Zealanders were awarded the medal. The decision to award the medal is made by the United Kingdom, although New Zealanders require the approval of the prime minister of New Zealand to wear the medal, as the British medal is considered a foreign honour in New Zealand. However, it is listed in New Zealand's official order of wear.

The New Zealand Government did not issue its own medal. Responding to a Official Information Act request, the Clerk to the Executive Council of New Zealand noted that New Zealand had not issued medals to mark royal occasions in "recent times", primarily due to the cost and difficulty of administering a domestic medal programme.

=== History ===
The British coronation medal was announced on 5 May 2023, the day before the coronation.

The Scottish Government initially stated they would not help fund the British coronation medal. However, the government reversed its decision in October 2023, agreeing to help fund its cost for all eligible Scots. The estimated cost to provide all eligible Scots the medal was £200,000.

== Canadian medal ==
The obverse and reverse of the Canadian medal

The Canadian medal was the first domestic commemorative medal to mark a coronation. (Note: The last coronation medal awarded in Canada before the creation of the King Charles III Coronation Medal was the 1953 Queen Elizabeth II Coronation Medal, which was struck by the British Royal Mint in the United Kingdom.) The Chancellery of Honours of the Office to the Secretary to the Governor General was responsible for administering the medal on behalf of the government of Canada. The medals were manufactured by the Royal Canadian Mint.

=== Design ===
The medal was designed by the Fraser Herald of the Canadian Heraldic Authority, Cathy Bursey-Sabourin. The medal is made out of nickel silver and is coloured silver, with a diameter of 32 millimetres (1.3 in), and with a ring suspension.

The obverse features a crowned and robed effigy of the King facing right, circumscribed by the inscription "CHARLES III DEI GRATIA REX • CANADA" (Latin: "Charles III, by the Grace of God, King • Canada"). The reverse shows the royal cypher CIIIR surmounted by the Canadian Royal Crown, over the sunburst design of the Canadian coronation emblem. The date of the coronation is inscribed to the left of the cypher and the words VIVAT REX (Latin: Long Live The King) to its right.

The medal's ribbon design is identical to the British coronation medal, using a dark blue, bright red, and white arrangement.

=== Eligibility ===
The medal was awarded to 30,000 individuals, including 4,000 members of the Canadian Armed Forces and 1,000 Public Service employees, including those in the Department of National Defence. A further 1,300 were allocated to members of the Royal Canadian Mounted Police.

Partner organizations chosen by the government of Canada nominated and presented medals to individuals meeting the medal's eligibility criteria. To be eligible for the Canadian medal, a person must:

- have made a significant contribution to Canada or to a particular province, territory, region of, or community in, Canada, or attained an outstanding achievement abroad that brings credit to Canada; and
- have been alive on 6 May 2023, the date of the Coronation.

There was no requirement for the recipient to be a Canadian citizen.

=== History ===
Prime Minister Justin Trudeau announced the coronation medal program on 3 May 2023 to honour Canadians who made significant contributions to the country, a province, territory, region, or community, or achieved abroad in a way that brought credit to Canada. However, little update was provided for the rest of 2023 concerning the status of the medal program.

Excerpting from a CBC News: Politics report, the Monarchist League of Canada claimed the delay in the medal program was due to two coinciding issues. First, there was a disagreement between the King and his Canadian Cabinet over whether Queen Camilla's effigy should appear on the medal's obverse, with the Cabinet arguing against her inclusion due to her absence from the Canadian order of precedence and the Queen not having a constitutional role. Second, the resignation of the secretary to the governor general, whose office manages the medal program, contributed to the delay.

The medal was eventually unveiled on 6 May 2024, on the first anniversary of the coronation. Governor General Mary Simon hosted a virtual ceremony to present the inaugural medals to lieutenant governors and territorial commissioners across Canada. On the same day, some lieutenant governors and territorial commissioners also held presentations in their province or territory, which included the first military recipients of the medal.

== Precedence in each realm ==
Some orders of precedence are as follows:

Country	Preceding	Following
(Australia) Australia; Order of precedence	Queen Elizabeth II Platinum Jubilee Medal	80th Anniversary Armistice Remembrance Medal
(Canada) Canada; Order of precedence	Queen Elizabeth II Diamond Jubilee Medal	Royal Canadian Mounted Police Long Service Medal
New Zealand	Queen Elizabeth II Platinum Jubilee Medal	New Zealand 1990 Commemoration Medal
(United Kingdom) United Kingdom; Order of precedence	Queen Elizabeth II Platinum Jubilee Medal	Royal Household Long and Faithful Service Medal
