= Maryborough Military and Colonial Museum =

Coordinates: 25.53884°S 152.70545°E

Maryborough Military & Colonial Museum
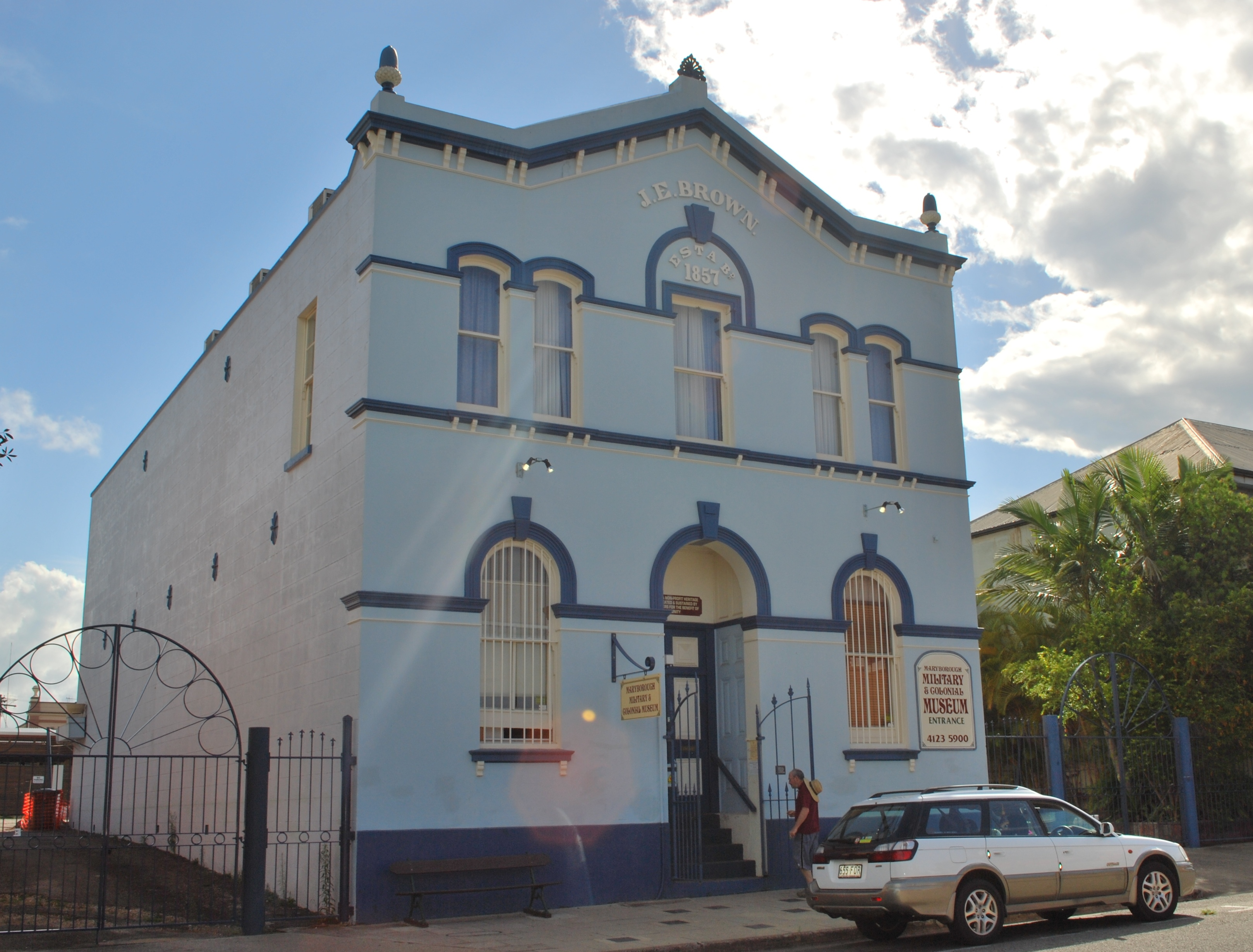
- Maryborough Military and Colonial Museum, 2008
- Founded: 2004
- Founder: John & Else Meyers
- Headquarters: Maryborough, Queensland Australia
- Website: http://www.maryboroughmuseum.org

The Maryborough Military & Colonial Museum is a non-profit museum located at 106 Wharf Street, Maryborough, Queensland, Australia. It was established and is operated by John and Else Meyers for the benefit of the Fraser Coast community.

== Displays ==
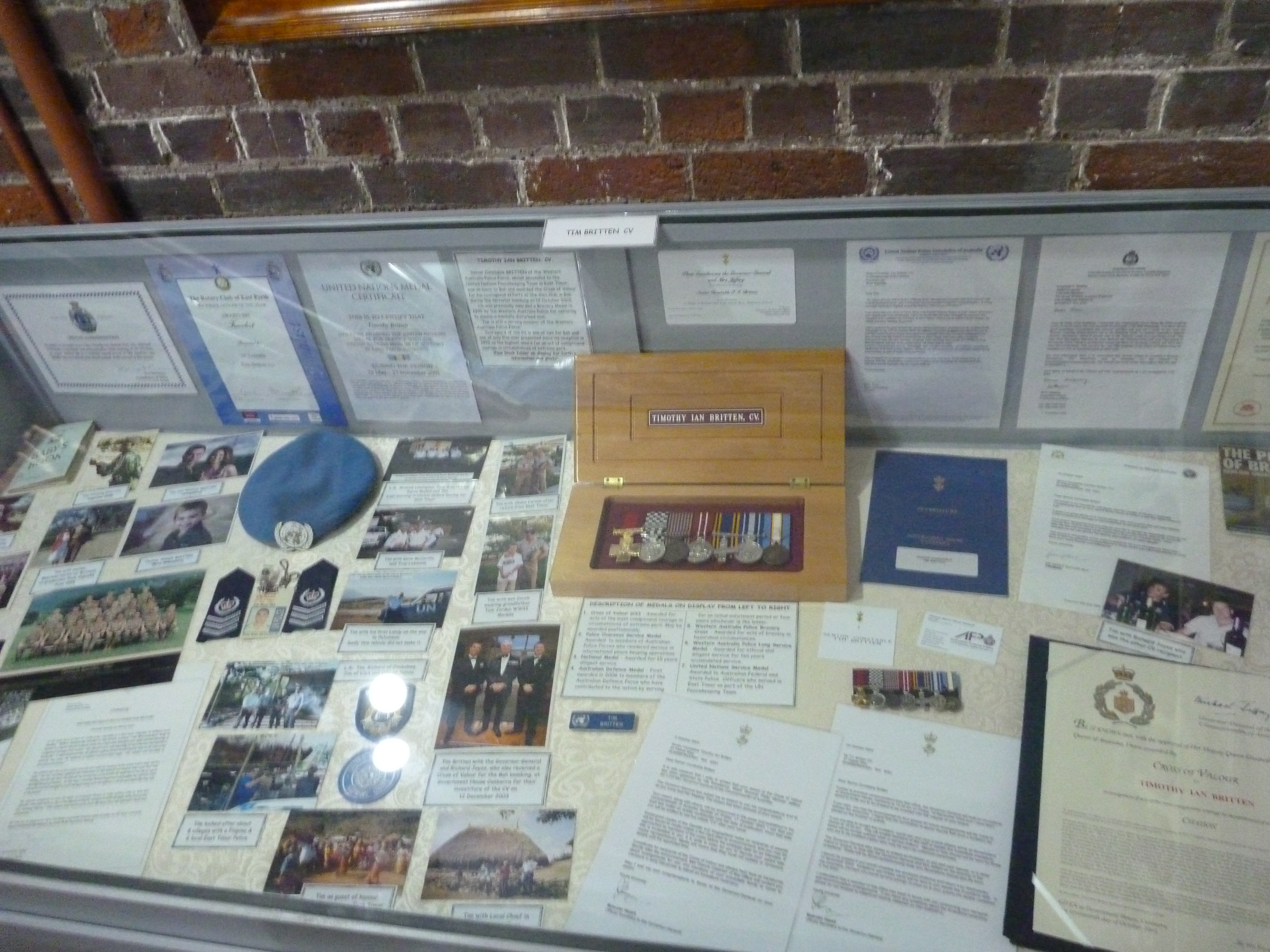
Timothy Britten display

The museum houses a number of displays of subject such as Keith Payne, VC OAM; Herbert James, VC MC; Timothy Britten, CV; John Cantwell, AO DSC; Harry Smith, SG MC; and James Runham, SC AFSM OAM.

The museum has the largest number of Victoria Crosses in a private museum collection in Australia. The museum also has the only Cross of Valour (Australia) medal on public display; the one awarded to Timothy Britten following the 2002 Bali bombings.

The museum houses a number of medals awarded to General William Birdwood.

== Heritage property ==
The museum occupies the former J. E. Brown warehouse, which is listed on the Queensland Heritage Register.
