= Cross of Valour Association of Australia =

Organization

- Location: Australia
- President: Allan Sparkes
- Website: www.crossofvalour.org.au

The Cross of Valour Association of Australia (CVAA) is made up of holders of the Cross of Valour, the highest Australian civilian award for bravery. The association was formed in 2013.

== Key people ==
=== President ===
- Allan Sparkes (2013 to present)

=== Vice President ===
- Timothy Britten (2017 to present)
- Darrel Tree 2016
- Timothy Britten (2013 to 2015)

=== Secretary ===
- Clive Johnson (2015 to present)
- John Meyers (2013 to 2014)

=== Official patrons ===
- The Honourable Quentin Bryce AD, CVO (present)
- Mr Michael Bryce AM, AW (present)
