= Timothy Britten =

Australian police officer

Timothy Ian Britten CV
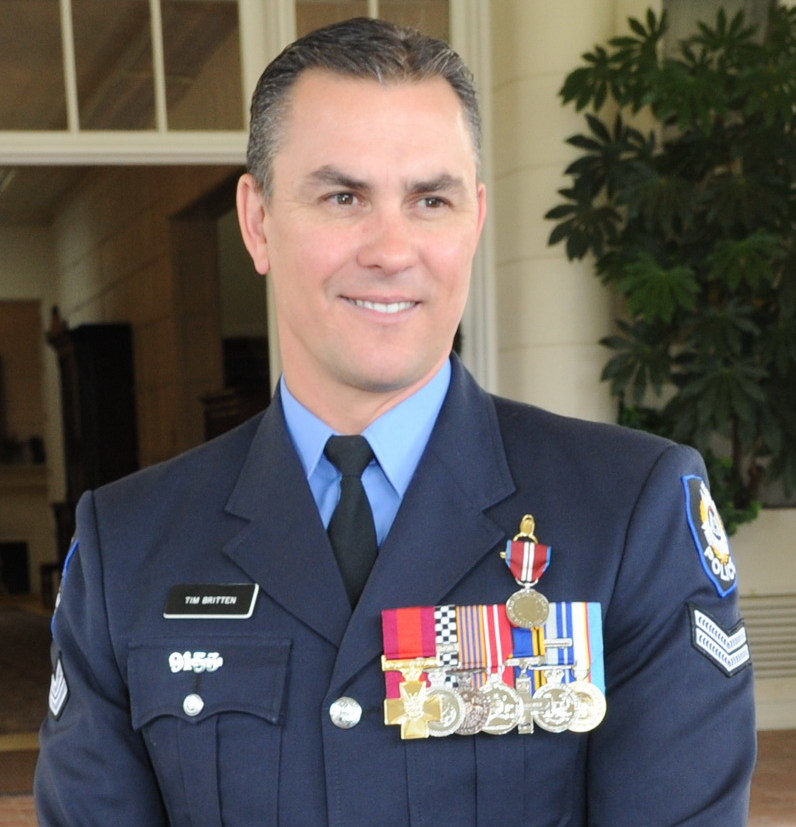
- Born: Perth, Western Australia
- Police career
- Country: Western Australia Police
- Allegiance: Australia
- Rank: Senior Sergeant
- Awards: Cross of Valour; Medal of the Order of Timor-Leste (Timor-Leste)

Timothy Ian Britten CV is a senior sergeant in the Western Australia Police. He is one of the five recipients of the Cross of Valour, Australia's highest civilian bravery decoration. He was awarded the Cross of Valour for his actions in the immediate aftermath of the 2002 Bali bombings.

This award makes him Australia’s highest-decorated police officer.

== 2002 Bali bombings ==
On 12 October 2002, Britten was in Bali on leave. As a Western Australia Police constable, he was serving with the United Nations Mission of Support in East Timor. While walking back to his hotel at approximately 11:00 pm, he heard an explosion that he believed had resulted from a bomb. Britten immediately responded, running approximately 800 metres to the Sari Club.

Upon arriving at the Sari Club, Britten found that the club had been destroyed, having been reduced to a burning shell. The victims of the bombing were lying all about the scene. It was reported to Britten that there was a woman trapped in the building. Without hesitation, he ran into the burning building, making his way through the debris as gas cylinders exploded around him. He located the severely injured woman, who was conscious but pinned underneath rubble and a piece of iron. Forced back by the intense heat and smoke from the fire, Britten left the burning remains of the building to seek help. Finding fellow Australian Richard Joyes out in the street searching for his own friends, Britten recruited Joyes to enter the building with him to attempt to rescue the trapped woman. Again, forced back by the heat of the fire, Britten and Joyes had to leave the building. Lacking any type of protective clothing, Britten and Joyes were doused in bottled water in an attempt to protect themselves from the fire, as they again re-entered the building. On this third attempt for Britten, he and Joyes were able to free the woman from the wreckage, carrying her out of the club, where she was transported to receive medical attention.

After freeing the woman, Britten continued to search the building for survivors until the intensity of the fire made it impossible to continue. Throughout his rescue attempts, Britten was aware of the danger of being severely injured or killed, yet persisted in his efforts until it was no longer possible. In summary, the citation for the Cross of Valour states: "Constable Britten remained at the site helping Indonesian police and security guards, and only when he felt assured that emergency workers had the Sari Club site secured did he return to his hotel. On that night, Constable Britten selflessly placed himself in constant danger, sustaining burns to his arm, deep cuts and abrasions to his feet from explosion debris, potential injury from gas cylinder explosions, and exposure to deadly infection from blood-borne diseases."

In 2016, Melbourne-based artist George Petrou painted Britten's portrait as his entry for the Archibald Prize. The portrait was a black-and-white painting of Britten in his police uniform, wearing his medals. All of the medals, except the Cross of Valour, are painted in black and white. The Cross of Valour was painted in its actual colours of red and gold.

== Cross of Valour ==
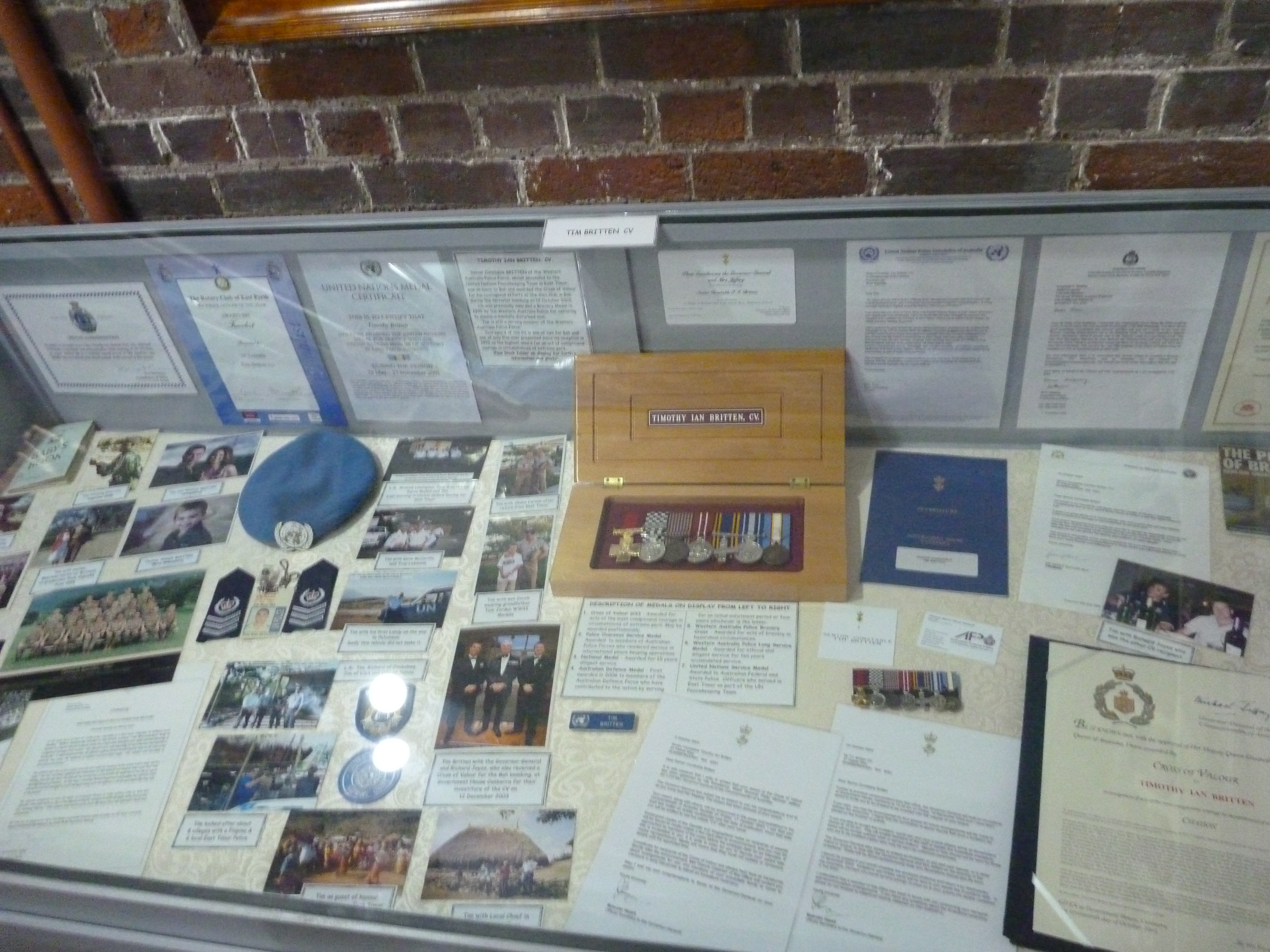
The Tim Britten exhibit at the Maryborough Military and Colonial Museum.

Britten was awarded the Cross of Valour on 17 October 2003, and was presented the medal by the then Governor-General of Australia, Major General Michael Jeffery.

The Cross of Valour, along with his other awards, his police uniform and a number of photographs and personal effects, are on display at the Maryborough Military and Colonial Museum.

== Cross of Valour Association of Australia ==
In 2013 Britten, along with Allan Sparkes and John Meyers who is the director of the Maryborough Military & Colonial Museum founded the Cross of Valour Association of Australia. Britten is the inaugural vice-president of the Association.

== Ambassador role ==
In December 2012, Britten was made a vice patron of the Australian Bravery Association.

In August 2014, Britten was made an ambassador for Soldier On, a charity that provides support and assistance to Australian soldiers who have been physically or psychologically wounded.

In June 2015, Britten was made an ambassador for Day for Daniel 2015 which is run by the Daniel Morcombe Foundation, an organisation founded by Bruce and Denise Morcombe, parents of murdered child Daniel Morcombe.

In November 2015, Britten was made an Australia Day ambassador.

In July 2016, Britten was appointed as a trustee of the ANZAC Day Trust in Western Australia.

In December 2016, it was announced that Britten was an ambassador for Blue Hope, an organisation dedicated to preventing and raising awareness of police suicide.

In September 2018, it was announced that Britten was an ambassador for the Immunisation Foundation of Australia. Britten is a strong advocate for vaccination after contracting pertussis, commonly known as whooping cough, in 2011.

== Honours and awards ==
Britten is also the holder of the Police Overseas Service Medal, with East Timor clasp, the National Medal, the Australian Defence Medal, the Western Australian Police Award for Bravery, the Western Australian Police Service Medal, the United Nations Medal for the United Nations Mission of Support to East Timor (UNMISET) and was one of ten Australians, including the four other Cross of Valour recipients, to be awarded the Queen's Diamond Jubilee Medal.

Britten is currently Australia's highest-decorated police officer.

National medals:

Ribbon	Description	Notes
Ribbon of the Cross of Valour	Cross of Valour (CV)	(10 October 2003) For acts of the most conspicuous courage in circumstances of extreme peril.
Ribbon of the Police Overseas Service Medal	Police Overseas Service Medal	With 'EAST TIMOR' clasp. Recognises those members of an Australian police force who undertake service with international peace-keeping organisations, or following a request from another government for assistance.
Ribbon of the National Police Service Medal	National Police Service Medal	Recognition for the unique contribution and significant commitment of those persons who have given ethical and diligent service as a sworn member of an Australian police service
Ribbon of the Queen Elizabeth II Diamond Jubilee Medal	Queen Elizabeth II Diamond Jubilee Medal	(2012)
Ribbon of the Queen Elizabeth II Platinum Jubilee Medal	Queen Elizabeth II Platinum Jubilee Medal	(2022)
Ribbon of the King Charles III Coronation Medal	King Charles III Coronation Medal	(2023)
Ribbon of the National Medal	National Medal	Operational members of specified organisations which serve or protect the community at hazard to themselves, including police, fire, ambulance, corrective services, emergency services and voluntary search and rescue services
Ribbon of the Australian Defence Medal	Australian Defence Medal	Recognises current and former Australian Defence Force personnel who completed an initial enlistment period, or four years' service
Ribbon of the UNAMET	United Nations Medal	For United Nations Mission of Support in East Timor (UNMISET)
Ribbon of the Order of Timor-Leste	Medal of the Order of Timor-Leste	(21 August 2026) "For his service to Timor-Leste"

WA Police medals:

Ribbon	Description	Notes
	Western Australia Police Cross for Bravery	(13 June 1996)
	Western Australia Police Medal	
