= 2024 Special Honours (Australia) =

The Special Honours Lists for Australia are announced by the Sovereign and Governor-General at any time.

Some honours are awarded by other countries where King Charles III is the Head of State, Australians receiving those honours are listed here with the relevant reference.

This list also incorporates the Mid Winters Day honours list and the Bravery honours lists.

== Victoria Cross for Australia (VC) ==
Ribbon bar of the Victoria Cross for Australia

- The late Private Richard Leslie Norden, DCM – 1 October 2024 – For most conspicuous acts of gallantry in action in the presence of the enemy in the ‘AO Surfers’ Area of Operations in the Bien Hoa province, Vietnam, on 14 May 1968 during the Battle of Fire Support Base Coral. The Victoria Cross for Australia replaced the Distinguished Conduct Medal which was cancelled in the same gazette notice.

== Knight Bachelor ==
Knight Bachelor ribbon

- Arthur Llewellyn Jones, OBE – 15 June 2024 – For services to Business and to the Community. Awarded as part of Papua New Guinea's 2024 Birthday Honours list.

== Order of Australia ==
Ribbon bar of the Order of Australia (General)

Ribbon bar of the Order of Australia (Military)

=== Companion of the Order of Australia (AC) ===
Honorary General

- John Gorman. California, United States of America – 19 April 2024 (authorised 19 July 2024) – For eminent service to medicine in co-discovering and pioneering a treatment for Rhesus disease for worldwide benefit to humanity.

=== Officer of the Order of Australia (AO) ===
Honorary Military

- General Mark Milley, Washington, United States of America – 4 January 2024 – For distinguished service and dedication to strengthening the military relationship between Australia and the United States through exceptional leadership and steadfast commitment to enhancing Alliance cooperation.
- General Thierry Burkhard, Paris, France – 8 May 2024 (authorised 19 April 2024) – For distinguished service as the Chief of Staff of the French Armed Forces.
- General Charles A. Flynn, Hawaii, United States of America – 18 June 2024 – For distinguished service in fostering and deepening the military relationship between Australia and the United States of America.
- General Yoshihide Yoshida, Tokyo, Japan – 18 June 2024 – For distinguished service in strengthening the defence relationship between Australia and Japan as the Chief of Staff, Joint Staff of the Japan Self-Defense Forces and Chief of Ground Staff, Japan Ground Self-Defense Force.
- Brigadier General Lord Fielakepa, Nuku’alofa, Tonga – 1 August 2024 – For distinguished leadership of His Majesty's Armed Forces of Tonga and fostering its relationship with the Australian Defence Force.

Honorary General

- Congressman Joe Courtney, Connecticut, United States of America – 22 May 2024 – For distinguished service to Australia's relationship with the United States of America.

=== Member of the Order of Australia (AM) ===
Honorary Military

- Major General Mubarak Ali Abdullah Al Neyadi, Abu Dhabi, United Arab Emirates – 15 April 2024 – For exceptional service in fostering the military relationship between Australia and the United Arab Emirates.

Honorary General

- Martin Indyk. Washington, United States of America – 9 January 2024 – For significant service to Australia-United States relations, particularly in the areas of foreign policy and leadership.

== Royal Victorian Order ==
Ribbon bar of the Royal Victorian Order

=== Commander of the Royal Victorian Order (CVO) ===
- His Excellency General The Honourable David John Hurley, AC, DSC, FTSE, lately Governor-General of the Commonwealth of Australia. Awarded as part of the 2024 Birthday Honours
- Lieutenant Paul Singer, MVO, RAN – 22 October 2024 – Upon relinquishment of the appointment of Official Secretary to the Governor-General of Australia.

=== Lieutenant of the Royal Victorian Order (LVO) ===
- Felicity Hugg – Director of Protocol, Department of the Prime Minister and Cabinet – 22 October 2024

=== Member of the Royal Victorian Order (MVO) ===
- Leanne Byrne – Director, Protocol, Community & Event, New South Wales Premier's Department – 22 October 2024
- Catherine Constanzo – Advisor, Department of the Prime Minister and Cabinet – 22 October 2024
- Lee Dawe – Property Manager, Admiralty House – 22 October 2024

== Most Excellent Order of the British Empire ==
Ribbon bar of the Order of the British Empire (Civil)

=== Officer of the Order of the British Empire (OBE) ===
- Professor Alan Jamieson – Director, Deep Sea Centre, University of Western Australia. For services to Marine Biology, Subsea Engineering and Exploration. Awarded as part of the 2024 New Year Honours

=== Member of the Order of the British Empire (MBE) ===
- Lynette Silver, AM – For services to British Families of World War II personnel. Awarded as part of the 2024 New Year Honours

== Distinguished Service Cross (DSC) ==
Ribbon bar of the Distinguished Service Cross

Australian Army

- Brigadier Patrick Francis McIntosh, AM (Retd) – 2 September 2024 – For distinguished command and leadership in warlike operations as the Commanding Officer of the Australian Medical Support Force, First Australian Contingent, to the United Nations Peacekeeping Mission Rwanda from August 1994 to March 1995.
- The late Brigadier Damian Stanley Roche – 2 September 2024 – For distinguished command and leadership in warlike operations as the Commanding Officer of the Australian Medical Support Force, Second Australian Contingent, to the United Nations Peacekeeping Mission in Rwanda from February to August 1995.
- Colonel Peter George Warfe (Retd) – 2 September 2024 – For distinguished command and leadership in warlike operations as the Commander, Australian Contingent to the United Nations Peacekeeping Mission in Rwanda from February to August 1995.

== Medal for Gallantry (MG) ==
Ribbon bar of the Medal for Gallantry

Royal Australian Navy

- Chief Petty Officer Gavin Ronald Stevens – 31 January 2024 (authorised 4 April 2024) – For acts of gallantry in action in hazardous circumstances as a commander, Tactical Explosive Ordnance Disposal patrol from Australian Clearance Diving Team Three on Operation FALCONER in Al Faw Peninsula, Iraq on 16 April 2003.

Australian Army

- Warrant Officer Class Two Ronald James Swanton – 2 September 2024 – For gallantry in action in hazardous circumstances on 13 November 1965 during a battle in the Tra Bong valley of Vietnam as an assistant advisor to the Army of the Republic of Vietnam.
- Warrant Officer Class Two Kevin Arthur Wheatley, VC – 2 September 2024 – For acts of gallantry in action in hazardous circumstances on 28 May and 18 August 1965 as an advisor and assistant advisor to the Army of the Republic of Vietnam.

Royal Australian Air Force

- Pilot Officer Warran Frank Cowan – 25 October 2023 (authorised 26 March 2024) – For acts of gallantry in action in hazardous circumstances on 22 July 1942 as the plane captain of Lockheed Hudson A16-201.
- Sergeant Russell Bradburn Pollack – 25 October 2023 (authorised 26 March 2024) – For acts of gallantry in action in hazardous circumstances on 22 July 1942 as the plane navigator of Lockheed Hudson A16-201.
- Sergeant Laurie Edwin Sheard – For acts of gallantry in action in hazardous circumstances on 22 July 1942 as the aircraft gunner of Lockheed Hudson A16-201.
- Pilot Officer David Reid Taylor – For acts of gallantry in action in hazardous circumstances on 22 July 1942 as the plane wireless operator of Lockheed Hudson A16-201.

== Bravery Medal (BM) ==
Ribbon bar of the Bravery Medal

- Mr P – The recipient displayed considerable bravery by their actions during a violent attack in Canberra, Australian Capital Territory in 2019.
- The late Mr R – The recipient displayed considerable bravery by their actions during a violent attack in Canberra, Australian Capital Territory in 2019.
- Kylie Fowler – Ms Kylie Fowler displayed considerable bravery by her actions during the attempted rescue of a driver in a crashed vehicle near Allansford, Victoria on 31 January 2020.
- John Edward McGann – Mr John McGann displayed considerable bravery by his actions rescuing people from a burning house in Highgate Hill, Queensland on 20 August 2022.
- Laines Nema – Mr Laines Nema displayed considerable bravery by his actions retrieving an unconscious man from rough seas in Port Kembla, New South Wales on 12 February 2021.
- Sergeant Nicholas Matthew Park, New South Wales Police Force – Sergeant Nicholas Park displayed considerable bravery by his actions rescuing a man from rough seas in Port Kembla, New South Wales on 12 February 2021.
- Jeferey Reid-Payne – Mr Jeferey Reid-Payne displayed considerable bravery for his actions during the restraint of an armed offender in Melbourne, Victoria on 9 November 2018.
- Lei Zhang – Mrs Lei Zhang displayed considerable bravery by her actions assisting a wounded man in the vicinity of an armed offender in Melbourne, Victoria on 9 November 2018.
- Erik Christian Fink – Mr Erik Fink displayed considerable bravery during the rescue of a teenager caught in a rip in Yamba, New South Wales on 23 February 2019.
- Robert Junior Kidd – Mr Robert Kidd displayed considerable bravery for his actions during a house fire in Pelican, New South Wales on 2 October 2016.
- Rodney Maxwell Patterson, AFSM – Mr Rodney Patterson displayed considerable bravery by his actions during the restraint of an armed offender in Melbourne, Victoria on 9 November 2018.
- The late Andrew Francis Powell – Mr Andrew Powell displayed considerable bravery by his actions during the attempted rescue of a man from rough seas in Port Campbell, Victoria on 21 April 2019.
- The late Ross William Powell – Mr Ross Powell displayed considerable bravery by his actions during the attempted rescue of a man from rough seas in Port Campbell, Victoria on 21 April 2019.
- Sergeant Luke Samuel Schroder, Victoria Police – Sergeant Luke Schroder displayed considerable bravery by his actions during the attempted rescue of a woman from a house fire in Monbulk, Victoria on 28 July 2020.

== Order of St John ==
Order of St John ribbon

=== Bailiff Grand Cross of the Order of St John ===
- Cameron John Oxley – 31 January 2024

== Commendation for Gallantry ==
Ribbon bar of the Commendation for Gallantry

Australian Army

- Warrant Officer John William Kinder – 2 September 2024 – For acts of gallantry in action while a prisoner of war in British North Borneo during World War Two.
- Private Samuel Solonsch – 14 November 2024 – For acts of gallantry in action following capture by the Imperial Japanese Army on 7 March 1942 until his execution as a result of an escape attempt and activities in support of the Dutch Resistance in Java on 11 April 1943.

Royal Australian Air Force

- Warrant Officer William Albert Kinloch – 25 October 2023 (authorised 26 March 2024) – For acts of gallantry in action over two tours of operational service with Number 464 Squadron.
- Pilot Officer Justin Reginald Mulligan – 25 October 2023 (authorised 26 March 2024) – For acts of gallantry in action over two tours of operational service with Number 464 Squadron.

== Commendation for Brave Conduct ==
Ribbon bar of the Commendation for Brave Conduct

- Mrs V – The recipient is commended for brave conduct for her actions during a violent attack in Canberra, Australian Capital Territory in 2019.
- Lachlan Mitchell Ashlin – Mr Lachlan Ashlin is commended for brave conduct for his actions following a house explosion in Cooroy, Queensland on 11 March 2021.
- Constable First Class Lachlan John Boal, Northern Territory Police Force – Constable First Class Lachlan Boal is commended for brave conduct for his actions rescuing an injured driver from a burning vehicle in Alice Springs, Northern Territory on 18 March 2022.
- Matthew James Brunton – Mr Matthew Brunton is commended for brave conduct for his actions during the attempted rescue of a driver trapped in a crashed vehicle on fire near Allansford, Victoria on 31 January 2020.
- Khan Arthur Bungate – Mr Khan Bungate is commended for brave conduct for his actions apprehending a violent offender in Caringbah, New South Wales on 4 October 2010.
- Denis Ross Byrne – Mr Denis Byrne is commended for brave conduct for his actions retrieving a man from the Murray River near Mildura, Victoria on 1 May 2015.
- The late Luke Johnathan Dorsett – The late Mr Luke Dorsett is commended for brave conduct for his actions after two rafts collided on a water ride at a theme park on the Gold Coast, Queensland on 25 October 2016.
- William James Farley – Mr William Farley is commended for brave conduct for his actions during a dingo attack on K'gari, Queensland on 3 April 2023.
- Shane William Fowler – Mr Shane Fowler is commended for brave conduct for his actions assisting a neighbour from a house fire in Burrum Heads, Queensland on 3 August 2021.
- John Mount Gee, – Mr John Gee is commended for brave conduct for his actions retrieving a young girl from the Brisbane River in Queensland on 17 April 2021.
- John Matthew Gordon – Mr John Gordon is commended for brave conduct for his actions rescuing a swimmer caught in rough seas at Dreamtime Beach in Fingal Head, New South Wales on 12 April 2023.
- Victor Antonio Guthrie – Mr Victor Guthrie is commended for brave conduct for his actions during the rescue of a man from a submerged vehicle in Menindee, New South Wales on 27 January 2006.
- Danny James Haber – Mr Danny Haber is commended for brave conduct for his actions after two rafts collided on a water ride at Dreamworld on the Gold Coast, Queensland on 25 October 2016.
- Samuel Haycroft – Mr Samuel Haycroft is commended for brave conduct for his actions rescuing a man from a capsized boat off Ventnor Beach on Phillip Island, Victoria on 29 July 2015.
- Senior Constable Kylie Anne Jones, Western Australia Police Force – Senior Constable Kylie Jones is commended for brave conduct for her actions during the rescue of two people from a car fire near Harvey, Western Australia on 12 March 2022.
- Constable Reece Michael Josemans, Western Australia Police Force – Constable Reece Josemans is commended for brave conduct for his actions during the rescue of two people from a car fire near Harvey, Western Australia on 12 March 2022.
- Dylan John Lazzaroni – Mr Dylan Lazzaroni is commended for brave conduct for his actions rescuing a person who had fallen from a waterfall in Mareeba, Queensland on 6 March 2021.
- Martin Ernest Long – Mr Martin Long is commended for brave conduct for his actions rescuing a trapped person from floodwaters in Wareek, Victoria on 13 October 2022.
- Katrina Lovelock – Ms Katrina Lovelock is commended for brave conduct for her actions apprehending two males who held her and her friends hostage in Bonython, Australian Capital Territory on 19 July 1999.
- Christopher John Lucas, – Mr Christopher Lucas is commended for brave conduct for his actions rescuing a person from flash flooding at a waterfall in Wooroonooran National Park, Queensland on 2 August 2019.
- Patrick George Mackey – Mr Patrick Mackey is commended for brave conduct for his actions during the rescue of a man from a submerged vehicle in Menindee, New South Wales on 27 January 2006.
- Brad McCosh – Mr Brad McCosh is commended for brave conduct for his actions rescuing a swimmer at Logans Beach in Warrnambool, Victoria on 4 March 2019.
- Mark Steven Milliken – Mr Mark Milliken is commended for brave conduct for his actions during the rescue of two people from a car fire near Harvey, Western Australia on 12 March 2022.
- Gary Nguyen – Mr Gary Nguyen is commended for brave conduct for his actions assisting two people struggling in the Parramatta River in Concord West, New South Wales on 14 August 2014.
- Donald Garry Ogden – Mr Donald Ogden is commended for brave conduct for his actions after a front-end loader caught fire in Queensland on 28 January 2018.
- Senior Constable Anthony William Poole, Queensland Police Service – Senior Constable Anthony Poole is commended for brave conduct for his actions rescuing a trapped driver from a burning vehicle in Mount Stuart, Queensland on 16 March 2021.
- Thomas Martin Robinson – Mr Thomas Robinson is commended for brave conduct for his actions during an armed arson attack in Coronet Bay, Victoria on 15 September 2019.
- Tenaia June Salesulu – Ms Tenaia Salesulu is commended for brave conduct for her actions rescuing a family from a house fire in Cranbourne, Victoria on 12 October 2020.
- Constable Adam Thomas See, Queensland Police Service – Constable Adam See is commended for brave conduct for his actions rescuing a trapped driver from a burning vehicle in Mount Stuart, Queensland on 16 March 2021.
- Steven Drew Shaw – Mr Steven Shaw is commended for brave conduct for his actions assisting an elderly neighbour from a burning residence in Langwarrin, Victoria on 4 October 2019.
- John Danial Stewart – Mr John Stewart is commended for brave conduct for his actions rescuing a trapped driver from floodwaters in St George, Queensland on 22 February 2020.
- Jamie Robert Stuart – Mr Jamie Stuart is commended for brave conduct for his actions rescuing a person from a burning car in Glenroy, Victoria on 26 December 2021.
- Levi John Symington, BM – Mr Levi Symington is commended for brave conduct for his actions following an incident with a driver in Canberra, Australian Capital Territory on 24 February 2021.
- Dylan Taylor – Mr Dylan Taylor is commended for brave conduct for his actions rescuing an unconscious person from a submerged vehicle in Dalby, Queensland on 4 April 2022.
- Timothy Richard Thorncraft – Mr Timothy Thorncraft is commended for brave conduct for his actions rescuing a man from a vehicle about to fall off a cliff in Kalang, New South Wales on 24 September 2021.
- Robert Tomecki – Mr Robert Tomecki is commended for brave conduct for his actions after a bank caught fire in Springvale, Victoria on 18 November 2016.
- Gregory Duncan Wiltshire – Mr Greg Wiltshire is commended for brave conduct for his actions assisting flood affected residents in Cudal, New South Wales on 13 November 2022.
- Daryl Christopher Wright – Mr Daryl Wright is commended for brave conduct for his actions assisting flood affected residents in Cudal, New South Wales on 13 November 2022.
- Nicholas Anthony Abussi – Mr Nicholas Abussi is commended for brave conduct for his actions treating a victim during the pursuit of an armed offender near Gatton, Queensland on 29 May 2017.
- Julie-Anne Allen – Mrs Julie-Anne Allen is commended for brave conduct for her actions during an assault at a youth justice centre in Malmsbury, Victoria on 3 October 2019.
- Steven John Apthorp – Mr Steven Apthorp is commended for brave conduct for his actions after two rafts collided on a water ride at Dreamworld on the Gold Coast, Queensland on 25 October 2016.
- Senior Constable Luke Edward Bevan, Northern Territory Police Force – Senior Constable Luke Bevan is commended for brave conduct for his actions apprehending a male armed with a kitchen knife in Alice Springs, Northern Territory on 17 July 2022.
- Petty Officer Jarryd Anthony Boyd, Royal Australian Navy – Mr Jarryd Boyd is commended for brave conduct for his actions taken during the rescue of a person from a house fire in Campsie, New South Wales on 13 April 2017.
- Peter John Buxton – Mr Peter Buxton is commended for brave conduct for his actions assisting passengers who were trapped on a burning bus in Moorooka, Queensland on 28 October 2016.
- Mariano Frank Catena – Mr Mariano Catena is commended for brave conduct for his actions during the rescue of a woman from a burning house in Northcote, Victoria on 16 September 2021.
- Mamadou Diallo – Mr Mamadou Diallo is commended for brave conduct for his actions during the attempted rescue of two males trapped in an ink vat at Auburn, New South Wales on 7 December 2017.
- Adam Ross Flory – Mr Adam Flory is commended for brave conduct for his actions treating a victim during the pursuit of an armed offender near Gatton, Queensland on 29 May 2017.
- Claudia Louise Hamilton, – Ms Claudia Hamilton is commended for brave conduct for her actions during the rescue of multiple people from the surf at Blueys Beach, Foster Tuncurry, New South Wales on 13 January 2023.
- David Wilfred Harrison – Mr David Harrison is commended for brave conduct for his actions during the rescue of two men from a burning house in Plenty, Victoria on 13 June 2020.
- Madeline Claire Hili – Mrs Madeline Hili is commended for brave conduct for her actions in rescuing two people from a river near Windsor, New South Wales on 25 January 2021.
- Shane David Hudson – Mr Shane Hudson is commended for brave conduct for his actions during the attempted rescue of three people from rough seas in Bushrangers Bay, Victoria on 13 January 2021.
- Joshua Craig Humphris – Mr Joshua Humphris is commended for brave conduct for his actions during the rescue of students from a partially submerged bus during flooding at Batchelor, Northern Territory on 7 March 2023.
- Sergeant Christopher Stuart Jacob, Western Australia Police Force – Sergeant Christopher Jacob is commended for brave conduct for his actions recovering a child's body from a river near Walpole, Western Australia on 17 October 2021.
- Ebony Helen Jones – Miss Ebony Jones is commended for brave conduct for her actions during an incident at Hilbert, Western Australia on 5 January 2023.
- Lachlan John Marks – Mr Lachlan Marks is commended for brave conduct for his actions during the rescue of an unconscious surfer at Fingal Head, New South Wales on 9 September 2019.
- Crispin McCorry – Mr Crispin McCorry is commended for brave conduct for his actions assisting passengers who were trapped on a burning bus in Moorooka, Queensland on 28 October 2016.
- Douglas McKenzie – Mr Douglas McKenzie is commended for brave conduct for his actions treating a victim during the pursuit of an armed offender near Gatton, Queensland on 29 May 2017.
- Yatin Mehta – Mr Yatin Mehta is commended for brave conduct for his actions during the attempted rescue of a man trapped in an ink vat at Auburn, New South Wales on 7 December 2017.
- Senior Sergeant Michael John Milde, Northern Territory Police Force – Senior Sergeant Michael Milde is commended for brave conduct for his actions apprehending a male armed with a kitchen knife in Alice Springs, Northern Territory on 17 July 2022.
- Michael Ettie Misi – Mr Michael Misi is commended for brave conduct for his actions during the rescue of a young girl from flood waters near Woree, Queensland on 17 February 2023.
- Maria Frances Mourilyan – Ms Maria Mourilyan is commended for brave conduct for her actions treating a victim during the pursuit of an armed offender near Gatton, Queensland on 29 May 2017.
- Aguek Nyok – Mr Ayuek Nyok is commended for brave conduct for his actions assisting passengers who were trapped on a burning bus in Moorooka, Queensland on 28 October 2016.
- Lay Jane Ong – Mrs Lay Ong is commended for brave conduct for her actions treating a victim during the pursuit of an armed offender near Gatton, Queensland on 29 May 2017.
- Christopher David Perrott, – Mr Christopher Perrott is commended for brave conduct for his actions during the attempted rescue of three people from rough seas in Bushrangers Bay, Victoria on 13 January 2021.
- Craig Scott Reynolds – Mr Craig Reynolds is commended for brave conduct for his actions assisting a woman in Wellard, Western Australia on 7 June 2021.
- Anthony William Roach – Mr Anthony Roach is commended for brave conduct for his actions during the rescue of person from a house fire in Baan Baa, New South Wales on 10 July 2021.
- Barney Robson – Mr Barney Robson is commended for brave conduct for his actions rescuing a person from a vehicle fire in Cowra, New South Wales on 30 May 2021.
- Alexander David Stewart – Mr Alexander Stewart is commended for brave conduct for his actions during the rescue of two people from a car fire near Harvey, Western Australia on 12 March 2022.
- Dean Tustin – Mr Dean Tustin is commended for brave conduct for his actions during the rescue of two men from a burning house in Plenty, Victoria on 13 June 2020.
- Lisa Mary Whitbourn – Mrs Lisa Whitbourn is commended for brave conduct for her actions during the rescue of a man in Merewether, New South Wales on 25 December 2022.
- Mr Jamieson Woods is commended for brave conduct for his actions treating a victim during the pursuit of an armed offender near Gatton, Queensland on 29 May 2017.

== Commendation for Distinguished Service ==
Ribbon bar of the Commendation for Distinguished Service

Australian Army

- Lieutenant Colonel Conrad Hayden Walsh – 26 October 2023 (authorised 25 March 2024) – For outstanding achievement in the performance of duty as the Public Affairs and Information Operations Advisor to the Kabul Garrison Command on warlike operations from 11 October 2016 to 15 June 2017.
- Captain John Edward Nerney, CSC (Retd) – 2 September 2024 – For distinguished performance of duties in warlike operations as the Health Advisor to the Australian military mission during the United Nations Peacekeeping Operation in Rwanda February to August 1995.

== Group Bravery Citation ==
Group Bravery Citation

The recipients are recognised with the award of the Group Bravery Citation for their actions after two rafts collided on a water ride at a theme park on the Gold Coast, Queensland on 25 October 2016.

- Danny James Haber
- Thomas William Hanson
- Joedy Charles Vincent

The recipients are recognised with the award of the Group Bravery Citation for their actions during a hostage siege at a cafe in Sydney, New South Wales on 15–16 December 2014.

- 28 members of the Tactical Operations Unit, Negotiation Unit, Rescue and Bomb Disposal, Dog Unit and Highway Patrol, New South Wales Police Force
- Oliver Raymond Aleman, New South Wales Ambulance
- Oliver Ellis, New South Wales Ambulance
- Christopher David Ennis, New South Wales Ambulance
- Daniel Trincado, New South Wales Ambulance

The recipients are recognised with the award of the Group Bravery Citation for their actions intercepting an armed attacker in Garran, Australian Capital Territory on 23 March 2019.

- Michael Anthony Swan

The recipients are recognised with the award of the Group Bravery Citation for their actions after a front-end loader caught fire in Queensland on 28 January 2018.

- Michael Beusch
- Brenden Thomas Halloran
- Ivan Laurence Horne
- Ashley Jensen
- Wayne Marxson
- Darren Morris
- Donald Garry Ogden
- Lance Philips
- Steve Rizzini

The recipients are recognised with the award of the Group Bravery Citation for their actions during a hostage siege at a cafe in Sydney, New South Wales on 15–16 December 2014.

- One member added, to total 29 members of the Tactical Operations Unit, Negotiation Unit, Rescue and Bomb Disposal, Dog Unit and Highway Patrol, New South Wales Police Force

The recipients are recognised with the award of the Group Bravery Citation for their actions rescuing people from rough seas near St Helens, Tasmania on 29 December 2014.

- Pieter Johannes De Bruyn
- Steven James De Bruyn
- Jak Christopher Oxford

The recipients are recognised with the award of the Group Bravery Citation for their actions after two rafts collided on a water ride at a theme park on the Gold Coast, Queensland on 25 October 2016.

- Steven John Apthorp

The recipients are recognised with the award of the Group Bravery Citation for their actions rescuing seven people in dangerous surf conditions near Wollongong, New South Wales on 18 January 2021.

- Adrian Kors
- William Gerard Kors
- Adam Turner

== King Charles III Coronation Medal ==
Ribbon bar of the King Charles III Coronation Medal

- Keith Payne, VC, AM – 2 May 2024
- Daniel Keighran, VC – 2 May 2024
- Victor Boscoe, CV – 2 May 2024
- Mark Donaldson, VC – 21 May 2024
- Allan Sparkes, CV, OAM – 12 June 2024
- Ben Roberts-Smith, VC, MG – 28 June 2024
- Australia's Federation Guard – 7 November 2024
