= Allan Sparkes =

Detective senior constable (born 1958)

- Born: 1958 (age 67–68); Molong, New South Wales
- Police career
- Country: New South Wales Police
- Allegiance: Australia
- Service years: 1977–1998
- Status: Retired
- Rank: Senior Constable
- Awards: Cross of Valour; Medal of the Order of Australia; Commendation for Brave Conduct

Allan John Sparkes, CV, OAM (born 1958) Former Deputy Commissioner of the Mental Health Commission of NSW. He is also a retired Detective senior constable of the New South Wales Police, serving from 1977 to 1998. He is one of the five recipients of the Cross of Valour, Australia's highest bravery decoration, which was awarded for his actions in the rescue of a child from a flooded storm water drain in 1996.

== Cross of Valour events ==
About mid morning on 3 May 1996, Sparkes, a detective senior constable with the New South Wales Police, rescued a boy trapped in a flooded underground storm water drain following record rainfalls at Coffs Harbour.

Sparkes and Detective Senior Constable Gavin Dengate responded to an urgent call for assistance to rescue a boy trapped in a flooded storm water drain. From the entrance of the drain, an object, believed to be the missing child, could be seen about 80–100 metres away. Tied to a rope, Sparkes entered the drain and was rapidly washed 20 metres along the pipe by the ferocity of the current before realising the rope was inadequate. With a more substantial line, he re-entered the drain even though breathing space in the pipe had been reduced by the rising flood waters and his own bulk displacement. Flood waters washed him some 80 metres downstream before he could establish that the object was only debris. The drain was now almost totally engulfed in flood water, leaving only a small air space, and Sparkes was in danger of drowning as frantic attempts were made by his colleague and others to haul him against the flow to the surface.

Although believing the child had little or no chance of survival, screams were heard further downstream in a pipe under a section of the Pacific Highway at the junction of six drains. Believing that the child was drowning and had to be rescued by the fastest means possible, Sparkes and Dengate descended into the flooded pipe in total darkness without a life line, torch or emergency air supply. As it was impossible to call to the child above the roar of the flood water, the rescuers separately searched the maze of water pipes. After progressing deeper into the drainage system, Sparkes could hear the desperate screams more clearly and believed he had located the boy's position.

It was agreed that Dengate would search at ground level for another manhole closer to the child to facilitate a faster rescue. An ambulance officer, Michael Marr, then descended into the drains and remained in the flooded junction area to assist Sparkes. Sparkes secured a rope to himself and, with the aid of a torch, crawled back up the flooded drain.

Exhausted from his ordeal, Sparkes dragged himself against the flow, finally, making contact with the child and managing to calm him. At this stage Sparkes was 30 metres from the pipe opening and 3 metres underground. Sparkes managed to coax the boy into letting go of debris, and allow himself to be washed down the drain to where Sparkes could grab and secure him. Sparkes then placed the boy in front of himself and they were both washed down the pipe to the waiting ambulance officer.

Sparkes suffered lacerations and abrasions to his back and shoulder and cuts to his fingers and feet from forcing his way against the flow. Throughout the rescue Sparkes was aware that he was in grave danger of losing his life as he believed that the whole of the storm water system was only minutes away from again being totally engulfed with flood water.

== Later career ==
Sparkes has been active in various community and social programs since the early 2000s. Among others, he has been an ambassador for Beyondblue (since 2013) and formerly an Ambassador for the wounded service person charity Soldier On (since 2014), and has also worked with suicide prevention initiatives, the Heart Foundation, he is currently an Ambassador for Kookaburra Kids and has been an Australia Day Ambassador since 2017. He is also the Foundation Patron of the Stay Kind Foundation, Chair of the National Police Bravery Award Committee and an advisor for various NSW Police Mental Health Programs and other charitable organisations. Sparkes is also Vice Patron of the Australian Bravery Association and President of the Cross of Valour Association of Australia.

Sparkes's story features as chapter three of the book Brave: Ordinary Australians and Their Extraordinary Acts of Courage, by Mark Whittaker. In 2013, Sparkes penned his autobiography, The Cost of Bravery, with help from Whittaker.

In August 2016 Sparkes was awarded Australia's fourth highest bravery decoration, the Commendation for Brave Conduct, for saving the life of an Aboriginal man who had fallen onto the path of an oncoming train at Redfern railway station in April 2014. The Commendation was followed by the award, in January 2017, of a Medal of the Order of Australia for Sparkes' service to mental health support organisations and to the community.
