= Cross of Valour (Australia) =

Australian bravery decoration

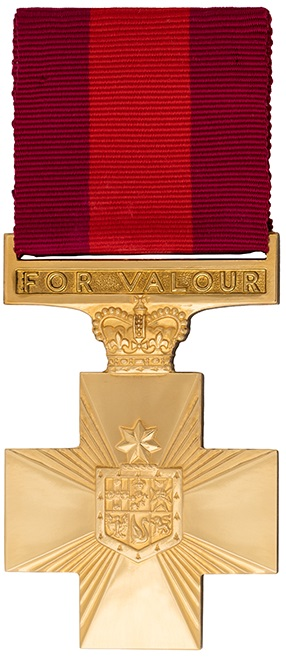
- Type: Medal
- Awarded for: "acts of the most conspicuous courage in circumstances of extreme peril"
- Presented by: Governor-General of Australia
- Eligibility: Australian citizen
- Post-nominals: CV
- Status: Currently awarded
- Established: 14 February 1975
- First award: 1989
- Final award: 2003

Highlights
- Total: 5

Order of wear
- Next (higher): George Cross (GC)(If awarded on or before 5 October 1992)
- Next (lower): Knight/Lady of the Garter (KG/LG)
- Related: Star of Courage; Bravery Medal; Commendation for Brave Conduct; Group Bravery Citation

The Cross of Valour was established in 1975 as part of the institution of the Australian Honours System, and is Australia's highest decoration for courage. The Cross of Valour has been awarded to five Australian civilians and, although there has been no military recipient, they would be eligible in situations where normal military honours do not apply.

The Cross of Valour is awarded "only for acts of the most conspicuous courage in circumstances of extreme peril". It is awarded by the governor-general of Australia, on the recommendation of the Australian Bravery Decorations Council. The award carries the post-nominal initials CV; awards may be made posthumously.

== Description ==
- The Cross of Valour is a gold, straight-armed cross pattée with diminishing rays between the arms. It is ensigned with the Crown of St Edward.
- The obverse has the shield and crest of the Commonwealth Coat of Arms surmounted by a Federation Star. A suspender bar is engraved with the words 'For Valour'.
- The ribbon is 38 mm wide, magenta with a central 16 mm blood-red band. The two reds in the ribbon represent the colours of venous and arterial blood.

== List of recipients ==
To date, the Cross of Valour has been awarded to five recipients.

1989

- Mr Darrell Tree, Captain of Mount Damper Fire Brigade, SA – Rescued a 3-year-old child from electrocution.

1995

- Mr Victor Boscoe, Qld – Pursued and apprehended armed robbers at Strathpine.

1998

- Senior Constable Allan Sparkes, NSW – Rescued a boy from flooded underground storm water drains.

2003

- Senior Constable Timothy Britten, WA – Entered the Sari Club, destroyed in the 2002 Bali bombings, to rescue a badly injured woman, and then searched for other potential survivors despite personal injury and ongoing explosions.
- Mr Richard Joyes, WA – Entered the bombed Sari Club alongside Senior Constable Timothy Britten to rescue a badly injured woman and search for other potential survivors despite personal injury and ongoing explosions. He represented recipients at the 2023 Coronation.

== Decoration allowance ==
The Australian Department of Veterans' Affairs may grant an allowance, called decoration allowance, to a veteran who has been awarded the Cross of Valour if the veteran is in receipt of a pension under Part II of the Veterans' Entitlements Act 1986 (VE Act) and the award was for gallantry during a war to which the VE Act applies or during warlike operations. So far there have been no awards of the Cross of Valour during wars or warlike operations as required by the VE Act. The allowance has been A$2.10 per fortnight since the Goods and Services Tax in Australia commenced on 1 July 2000.

== See also ==
- Orders, decorations, and medals of Australia
- British and Commonwealth orders and decorations
- Cross of Valour – Canada's counterpart
- George Cross – United Kingdom's counterpart
- New Zealand Cross – New Zealand's counterpart
