= Star of Courage (Australia) =

Australian bravery decoration

- Medal and ribbon
- Type: Medal
- Awarded for: "acts of conspicuous courage in circumstances of great peril"
- Presented by: Governor-General of Australia
- Eligibility: Australian Citizen or a Foreign Citizen acting on behalf of Australia or an Australian
- Post-nominals: SC
- Status: Currently awarded
- Established: 14 February 1975
- First award: 1976
- Final award: 24 July 2018

Highlights
- Total: 182

Order of Wear
- Next (higher): Star of Gallantry
- Next (lower): Distinguished Service Cross
- Related: Cross of Valour; Bravery Medal; Commendation for Brave Conduct; Group Bravery Citation

The Star of Courage (SC) is a bravery decoration awarded by Australia. It is awarded for acts of conspicuous courage in circumstances of great peril. The SC was created on 14 February 1975. It is approved by the governor-general of Australia, on the recommendation of the Australian Bravery Decorations Council. The decoration recognises acts of bravery by members of the community. They selflessly put themselves in jeopardy to protect the lives or property of others. It is ranked second in the Australian civil bravery decorations in the Australian Honours System. Recipients of the Star of Courage are entitled to use the post-nominal letters "SC".

== Description ==
=== Medal ===
The Star of Courage is a silver, ribbed star with seven points ensigned with the Crown of Saint Edward. The obverse has the shield and crest of the Commonwealth Coat of Arms surmounted by a Federation Star.

=== Ribbon and bar ===
A suspender bar is engraved with the words "For Courage". The 32mm medal ribbon is dark red with a central magenta band of 14mm width, representing the colours of venous and arterial blood.

== Decoration allowance ==
Section 102 of the Veterans’ Entitlements Act 1986 (VEA) provides for the payment of an allowance called “decoration allowance” to a veteran who is in receipt of a disability pension under the VEA and who was awarded the Star of Courage for gallantry during a war or warlike operations covered by the VEA. At March 2008, this tax free allowance was A$2.10 per fortnight.

== See also ==
- Australian Honours Order of Wear
- List of recipients of the Star of Courage
