= Group Bravery Citation =

- Insignia
- Type: Citation
- Awarded for: a collective act of bravery by a group of people in extraordinary circumstances that is considered worthy of recognition
- Presented by: Governor-General of Australia
- Eligibility: Australian Citizen
- Clasps: None
- Status: Currently awarded
- Established: 5 March 1990
- First award: 3 May 1990
- Final award: 2024 Special Honours

Highlights
- Total: 1,100
- Related: Cross of Valour; Star of Courage; Bravery Medal; Commendation for Brave Conduct

The Group Bravery Citation is a decoration created in 1990 that is awarded to Australians for a collective act of bravery by a group of people in extraordinary circumstances that are considered worthy of recognition. It is awarded by the governor-general of Australia, with the approval of the sovereign, on the recommendation of the Australian Bravery Decorations Council. The decorations recognise acts of bravery by members of the community who selflessly put themselves in jeopardy to protect the lives or property of others.

It is ranked 5th in the list of Australian bravery decoration in the Australian honours system.

== Description ==
- The Group Bravery Citation is a bronze gilt sprig of wattle, Australia's floral emblem, positioned in the centre of a silver rectangle.
- The multi-leaf sprig of wattle represents the nature of group participation - the coming together of the many to create a single entity.

== Recipients ==
The Australian Government "It's an Honour" database contains 695 entries of people who have been awarded the medal.

== See also ==
- Australian Honours Order of Precedence
