= Commendation for Brave Conduct =

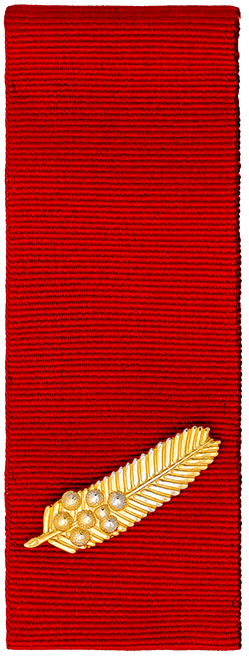
- Medal
- Awarded for: "an act of bravery that is worthy of recognition"
- Presented by: Governor-General of Australia
- Eligibility: Australian Citizen
- Status: Currently awarded
- Established: 1975
- Final award: 2024 Special Honours

Highlights
- Total: 2,309
- Ribbon

Order of Wear
- Next (higher): Commendation for Gallantry
- Next (lower): Commendation for Distinguished Service
- Related: Cross of Valour; Star of Courage; Bravery Medal; Group Bravery Citation

The Commendation for Brave Conduct is a bravery decoration awarded to Australians. It is awarded for an act of bravery that is worthy of recognition. The Commendation for Brave Conduct was created in February 1975. It is awarded by the governor-general of Australia, on the recommendation of the Australian Bravery Decorations Council. The decorations recognise acts of bravery by members of the community who selflessly put themselves in jeopardy to protect the lives or property of others. It is ranked fourth in the Australian bravery decoration in the Australian Honours System.

== Description ==
The Commendation for Brave Conduct is a silver gilt sprig of mimosa mounted on a blood-red backing ribbon.

== See also ==
- Australian Honours Order of Precedence
