= Bravery Medal (Australia) =

Bravery decoration awarded to Australians

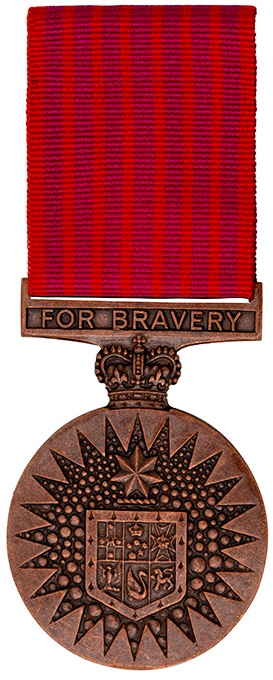
- Obverse of medal
- Type: Medal
- Awarded for: Acts of bravery in hazardous circumstances
- Presented by: Governor-General of Australia
- Eligibility: Australian citizen & citizens of another countries when the act of bravery is considered worthy of recognition by Australia
- Post-nominals: BM
- Status: Currently awarded
- Established: 14 February 1975
- First award: 1976
- Final award: 2024 Special Honours

Highlights
- Total: 1,521
- Total recipients: 1,519
- Ribbon of the medal

Order of Wear
- Next (higher): Medal for Gallantry (MG)
- Next (lower): Distinguished Service Medal (DSM)
- Related: Cross of Valour; Star of Courage; Commendation for Brave Conduct; Group Bravery Citation

The Bravery Medal (BM) is a bravery decoration awarded to Australians. It is awarded for acts of bravery in hazardous circumstances. The BM was created in February 1975. It is awarded by the governor-general of Australia, with the approval of the Sovereign, on the recommendation of the Australian Bravery Decorations Council. The decorations recognise acts of bravery by members of the community. They selflessly put themselves in jeopardy to protect the lives or property of others. It is ranked third of the Australian bravery decorations in the Australian Honours System. Recipients of the Bravery Medal are entitled to use the post-nominal letters "BM".

== Design ==
=== Medal ===
The Bravery Medal is a circular bronze medal ensigned with the Crown of Saint Edward. It is surmounted with the shield and crest of the Commonwealth Coat of Arms. The Federation Star is above the shield, which is contained in a circular zig-zag border.

=== Bar and ribbon ===
The medal is suspended from a ribbon by a bar inscribed "For Bravery". The ribbon is 32 mm wide and has 15 alternating stripes of blood-red and magenta representing the colours of venous and arterial blood.

== Recipients ==
As of November 2016, the Australian Government "It's an Honour" database contains 1,240 entries of people who have been awarded the medal.

== See also ==
- Australian Honours Order of Precedence
