= Australian Sports Medal =

Australian commemorative medal

- Obverse of medal and ribbon
- Type: Medal
- Awarded for: Sporting achievements
- Description: Introduced to recognise Australian sporting achievements.
- Presented by: Australia
- Eligibility: Australian Citizen
- Status: Currently issued
- Established: 23 December 1999
- First award: 8 February 2000
- Final award: 2022 Special Honours

Highlights
- Total: 20,232
- Website: https://www.pmc.gov.au/government/its-honour/australian-sports-medal

Order of Wear
- Next (higher): 80th Anniversary Armistice Remembrance Medal
- Next (lower): Centenary Medal

The Australian Sports Medal is an award given to recognise achievements in Australian sport to commemorate Australian participation in major sporting events. Original recipients of the award included competitors, coaches, sports scientists, office holders, and people who maintained sporting facilities and services. During the original period of its award in 2000–2001, over 18,000 medals were awarded. The award was permanently reactivated in 2020 to commemorate Australian contributions and participation in major multi-sport events.

== Description ==
- The medal is circular and made of nickel-silver with a highly polished finish. The obverse design symbolises Australian sport featuring the stars of the Southern Cross, and lines depicting the athletics track at the Australian Sports Stadium.
- The reverse features the same lines as the obverse symbolising the athletics track, with the words ‘to commemorate Australian sporting achievement’ appearing in the raised rim of the medal. The reverse is also marked with the year ‘2000’.
- The medal is suspended from a 32 mm ribbon by a connector piece and ring. The ribbon’s colours are Australia’s national sporting colours green and yellow.

== History ==
The Prime Minister announced the creation of the Australian Sports Medal on 31 December 1998 and was formally established on 23 December 1999 by Letters Patent. The medals were first awarded during the year 2000 and were discontinued in 2001.

On 4 December 2020, the Queen of Australia assented to amendments to the regulations for the Australian Sports Medal, which reactivated awards to commemorate Australian sporting participation in major multi-sports events, including:

- Invictus Games (from 2018)
- International Sports Federation for Persons with Intellectual Disability (INAS) Global Games (from 2019)
- Special Olympics World Summer Games (from 2019)
- Special Olympics World Winter Games (from 2021)
- Summer Olympic Games (from 2020)
- Winter Olympic Games (from 2022)
- Summer Paralympic Games (from 2020)
- Winter Paralympic Games (from 2022)
- Commonwealth Games (from 2022)

=== Recipients ===
The year is listed as such in the table due to the award numbers being made public based on the financial year in the Governor Generals Annual Report.

Year	Number awarded	Notes
1999-2000	18,012	Initially awarded during the awards first inception.
2021-22	982	Awards following reactivation of the medal.
2022-23	933	
2023-24	218	
2024-25	51	
2024-25	43	

== How it is awarded ==
The Australian Sports Medal is awarded by the Governor-General. This commemorative medal was introduced to recognise Australian sporting achievements. The medal acknowledges a range of Australians who, in different ways, contributed to the nation’s sporting success. Recipients included former competitors, coaches, sports scientists, office holders, and people who maintain sporting facilities and services. Most of the medals were presented to people following their nomination by the sports community. Peak sports bodies recognised or funded by the Australian Sports Commission were given quotas according to a formula based on the number of their registered competitors. All Australian parliamentarians could make nominations. The Australian Sports Medal does not carry a post-nominal entitlement.

With the reactivation of the award in 2020, details regarding the eligibility criteria, administration and application process have yet to be released, and new applications are not yet accepted for the award. On announcing the reactivation of the medal on 18 December 2020, Prime Minister Scott Morrison announced that the medal "will enable official members of Australian teams who participate in eligible international multi-sport events to be awarded the medal [...] The Australian Sports Medal will be awarded to eligible Australian team members and officials in recognition of their participation at international multi-sport events, and a number of international events for people with a disability."

== See also ==
- Australian Honours Order of Precedence
- Recipients of the Australian Sports Medal
