= 6th Battalion, Royal Australian Regiment =

Australian Army mechanised infantry battalion

- Badge of the 6th Battalion, RAR
- Active: 6 June 1965 – present
- Country: Australia
- Branch: Australian Army
- Type: Motorised infantry
- Part of: 7th Brigade
- Garrison/HQ: Enoggera Barracks
- Nickname: Bluedog
- Motto: "Duty First"
- March: Spirit of Youth (Band) The Crusaders (Pipes and Drums)
- Mascot: Australian Blue Cattle Dog
- Anniversaries: 18 August – Long Tan Day
- Engagements: Vietnam War: Battle of Long Tan; Operation Bribie; East Timor: Battle of Same; Iraq War; War in Afghanistan: Battle of Derapet
- Decorations: Unit Citation for Gallantry; Presidential Unit Citation (United States); Gallantry Cross Unit Citation (South Vietnam)

Commanders
- Current commander: LTCOL Emlyn Mordike
- Regimental Sergeant Major: WO1 Des McCoy
- Notable commanders: Lieutenant Colonel C.M. Townsend; Lieutenant Colonel David Butler

Insignia
- Unit colour patch

6th Battalion, Royal Australian Regiment (6 RAR) is a motorised infantry battalion of the Australian Army. It was originally raised in Brisbane, Queensland, on 6 June 1965 and has since then served in a number of overseas deployments and conflicts including South Vietnam, East Timor, Iraq and Afghanistan. During the Vietnam War, the battalion earned a US Presidential Unit Citation from the United States when members from 'D' Company participated in the Battle of Long Tan on 18–19 August 1966. The battalion is currently based at Gallipoli Barracks in Brisbane and forms part of the 7th Brigade.

== History ==
=== Formation ===
6 RAR was raised on 6 June 1965 at Alamein Barracks at Enoggera in Brisbane, Queensland, when a cadre of officers and non-commissioned officers (NCOs) and two rifle companies were transferred from 2 RAR to form the nucleus of the new battalion. The battalion was then brought up to full strength when an intake of 250 national servicemen marched-in in September 1965. The battalion's complement of platoon commanders was rounded out shortly after this with the arrival of six Scheyville graduates.

The battalion's first commanding officer was Lieutenant Colonel Colin Townsend, DSO, while Warrant Officer 1 George Chinn, DCM, came from the Special Air Service Regiment (SASR) based at Campbell Barracks in Perth as its first regimental sergeant major. It was initially assigned to the 6th Task Force (which was later to become 6th Brigade). In early 1966, 6 RAR received orders to deploy to Vietnam as part of the expansion of Australia's forces there. In order to prepare for this, the battalion undertook lead-up training at the Jungle Training Centre at Canungra and then at the Shoalwater Bay Training Area before the advance party flew out for Saigon on 31 May 1966.

=== Vietnam War ===
==== First tour ====
6 RAR served two tours in South Vietnam as part of Australia's commitment to the Vietnam War. The first tour was between June 1966 and June 1967 and the second tour was between May 1969 and May 1970. 6 RAR departed for its first tour of Vietnam in May 1966 on HMAS Sydney, arriving at Vũng Tàu in time to celebrate the battalion's first birthday before moving to Nui Dat, in Phuoc Tuy province, where they joined 5 RAR as part of the 1st Australian Task Force (1 ATF).

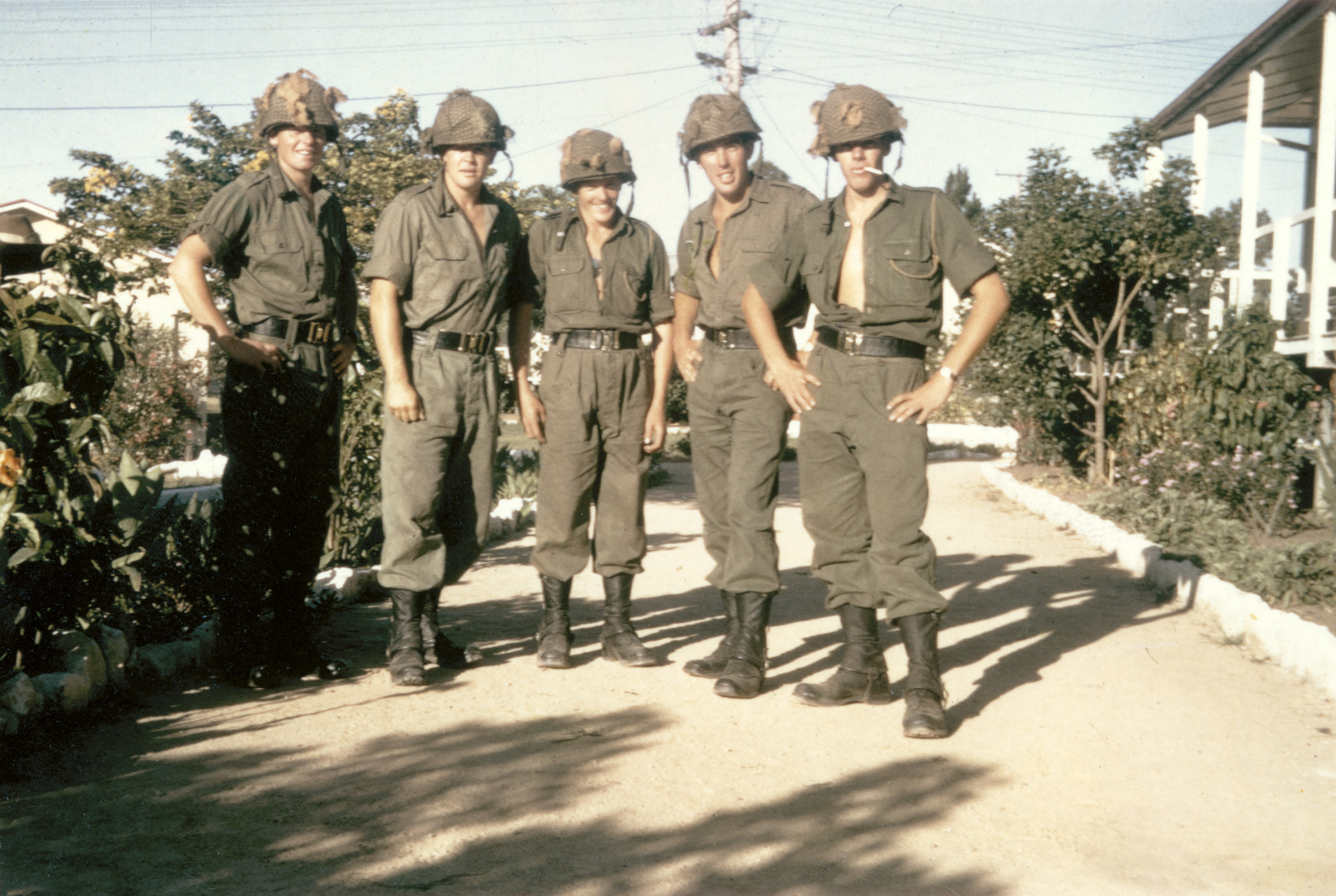
Five national servicemen assigned to 6 RAR photographed shortly before they and the battalion were deployed to South Vietnam in 1966

Initial operations focused upon securing the task force base. After this was achieved 1 ATF began patrolling operations throughout the province in an effort to undermine the operations of the Viet Cong (VC) and North Vietnamese People's Army of Vietnam (PAVN) units that were operating in Phuoc Tuy. Using tactics that the Australians had developed during the Malayan Emergency 1 ATF focused upon reducing the enemy's contact with the local population to deny them of their main source of sustainment and reinforcement; this was completed by carrying out cordon and search, and search and destroy operations. During this time 6 RAR carried out two major operations. The first operation was codenamed "Enoggera" and was focused upon clearing the village of Long Phuoc, while the second operation, "Hobart", was a search and destroy mission carried out over the course of five days. Several VC camps were destroyed in these operations and numerous caches of weapons and supplies uncovered, while 36 enemy casualties were inflicted.

Between 16 and 18 August 1966, 6 RAR undertook Operation Smithfield, which was later to become known as the Battle of Long Tan. The battle began on the evening of 16 August when Nui Dat was attacked by a VC force using mortars and recoilless rifles. The next day 'B' Company was sent out to clear the area to the east of the base, before they were replaced by 'D' Company on the morning of 18 August. While performing a sweep through a rubber plantation, 'D' Company was contacted by a regimental-sized VC force and they were soon under attack from three sides. Under a torrential downpour and a thick mist that blanketed the plantation, the battle raged for over three hours as the 108 men from 'D' Company fought for their lives against a force estimated to be up to 2,500 men.

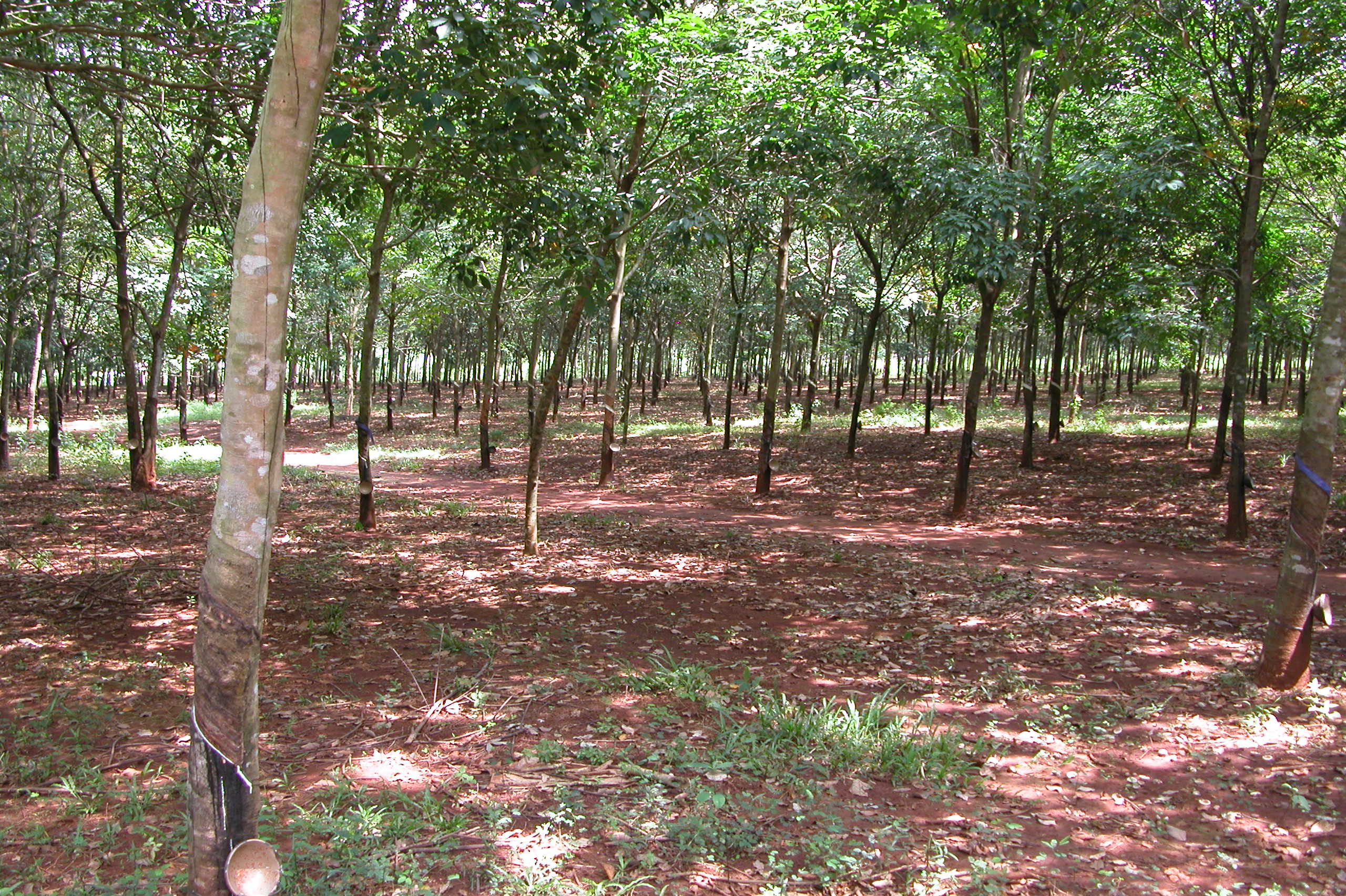
Part of the site of the Battle of Long Tan in 2005

As the rest of the battalion mobilised to relieve the beleaguered 'D' Company, a patrol from 'B' Company were the first reinforcements to arrive. As the battle continued, a relief force from 'A' Company arrived at a critical moment, on board seven M113 armoured personnel carriers from 3 Troop, 1st Armoured Personnel Carrier Squadron and launched an attack on a VC battalion that had been forming up to launch an attack aimed at 'D' Company's rear. Enemy casualties as a result of this attack were heavy, having come at their flank, and as a result the VC units were forced to retire, leaving the Australians in command of the battlefield. The extent of the Australian victory was not known until the following day, however, when 245 bodies of dead enemy soldiers were counted in the plantation and the surrounding areas. It is believed that many more were also removed during the battle.

Seventeen men from 6 RAR were killed, along with one from the 1st Armoured Personnel Carrier Squadron, during the fighting around Long Tan and later 'D' Company was awarded a US Presidential Unit Citation by the then President Lyndon B. Johnson. While the men of 'D' Company received this honour, the role of the other 6 RAR men in this battle should not be understated, nor should the contributions of the various Australian, New Zealand and American artillery units, as well as the bravery of the RAAF helicopter crews that flew through weather that would normally have grounded them to resupply the infantry on the ground.

Following this 6 RAR continued to conduct patrolling and security operations throughout Phuoc Tuy as 1 ATF took on a larger role in the province. 6 RAR undertook a further seventeen operations, before being relieved by 2 RAR in May 1967. Having celebrated the battalion's second birthday on the voyage back to Australia aboard HMAS Sydney, 6 RAR arrived back in Brisbane on 14 June.

==== Second tour ====
The battalion returned to South Vietnam for its second tour of duty on 19 May 1969, under the command of Lieutenant Colonel David Butler. Relieving 4 RAR, the battalion was re-designated as 6 RAR/NZ (ANZAC) due to the fact that there were two New Zealand rifle companies attached to them at this time, along with two mortar sections and two sections of assault pioneers. The main focus of 6 RAR's second tour was pacification operations, which essentially involved conducting operations designed to help create a situation of internal stability in order to allow the South Vietnamese government to take more control of the situation in the country. 6 RAR/NZ (ANZAC) carried out its first operation in this program between 30 May and 1 July 1969 when it launched Operation Lavarack. This operation involved the establishment of a number of fire support and patrol bases to the north of Nui Dat, from where company sized patrols commenced large-scale reconnaissance-in-force missions. Lavarack proved to be very successful and the battalion was involved in some 85 contacts with the VC during this time, resulting in over 102 VC killed and at least 22 wounded.

Over the course of the rest of the tour, 6 RAR conducted a further fourteen operations, and as they began to dominate their area of operations they were increasingly called upon to provide support to a number civil community reconstruction projects and assist in the training of local South Vietnamese forces. As a result of the battalion's efforts, by the end of their tour the enemy presence in their area of operations had been so badly weakened that they were forced to operate in small groups only, engaging the Australians in combat only when it was necessary to survive. On 18 August 1969, the battalion conducted a ceremony on the site of the Battle of Long Tan to dedicate a memorial (known as the Long Tan Cross) to the engagement.

6 RAR's last operation of the war was Operation Townsville, which was conducted between 23 March and 24 April 1970. A search and destroy mission that was carried out in the north-eastern regions of Phuoc Tuy province, the operation resulted in a huge coup for the Australians when they captured the operational signals codes and one-time cipher pads used by the VC headquarters in charge of the Ba Long province. In May 1970, 6 RAR was relieved by 2 RAR and returned to Australia shortly afterwards.

Australia's commitment to the Vietnam War came to an end before the battalion was called upon to deploy for a third tour. Total 6 RAR casualties for both tours were 61 killed and at least 148 wounded. Balanced against this, in its second tour the battalion was credited with having killed 60 VC, wounded at least another 64 and captured a further 51. Members from the battalion received the following decorations: two Distinguished Service Orders, seven Military Crosses, four Distinguished Conduct Medals, six Military Medals, three British Empire Medals, one Queen's Commendation, and 23 Mentions in Despatches.

=== 1972–1999 ===
The battalion was based in Singapore between July 1971 and December 1973 as part of the airportable 28th ANZUK Brigade, which was a mixed British/Australian/New Zealand infantry force that succeeded the "28th Commonwealth Infantry Brigade Group" in providing a presence in defence of neutral Malaysia and Singapore from external attack. Within this formation, 6 RAR served as a rapid reaction force to meet Australia's Southeast Asia Treaty Organization obligations and was involved in defending ANZUK Brigade assets in Singapore. Initially, the battalion's personnel consisted of a mixture of National Servicemen and Regular Army personnel, many of whom had seen combat service in Vietnam, although national service was abolished in December 1972. During its deployment, it participated in a number of tri-national exercises in Johore; it also rotated its rifle companies through Butterworth Air Base, situated in north-western Malaysia as a ready reaction force known as Rifle Company Butterworth, a commitment made by Australia under the Five Power Defence Arrangements (FPDA), to support Malaysia which was fighting against a communist insurgency. During its deployment, the battalion was based first at Selarang Barracks and then later at Kangaw Barracks and Nee Soon, and it had two commanding officers during this time: Lieutenant Colonel David Drabsch and then Lieutenant Colonel John Healy.

In April 1974, the battalion having returned to Enoggera from Singapore, received a new commanding officer Lieutenant Colonel Tony Hammett who established an unofficial parachute role. Hammett encouraged soldiers throughout the battalion to undertake parachute training, and in the short-lived role, in September formed an airborne company group for Exercise Strikemaster held at Shoalwater Bay training area. That same year, the battalion also provided assistance to the civil community in response to Cyclone Tracy, undertaking clean up tasks in Darwin. In early 1980, 'D' Company was reorganised as a parachute company group and in April 1981 conducted its first full scale deployment in Exercise Distant Bridge to Ross in Tasmania. D Company continued in this role until December 1983 relinquishing it to 3 RAR. As a result of shortcomings in the capability of the Australian Defence Force were highlighted in the wake of the 1987 Fijian coups d'état, the battalion was trained in the amphibious role. In April 1989, under the command of Lieutenant Colonel David Mead, the battalion took part in the combined arms Exercise Caltrop Force in California, during which it undertook amphibious operations in US Marine AAVP7s. Later, in February 1992, 6 RAR began conversion to a motorised organisation and added a Ready Reserve company later the same year. It reverted to an integrated-regular/reserve battalion in February 1997 and trialed the experimental Army 21 organisation.

=== East Timor 2000 ===
On Anzac Day 2000 6 RAR relieved 5/7 RAR at Balibo in East Timor, commencing a six-month tour of duty on the western border as part of Operation Tanager. Heavy rain in March had resulted in widespread flooding throughout the border region which had continued into May, however, by June the rivers had subsided and reports of incursions across the border from West Timor by pro-Indonesian militias were received, prompting 6 RAR to conduct extensive patrol operations throughout their tactical area of operations. Through a program of intensive active patrolling and tracking, surveillance, blocking and other security operations the battalion came to dominate the western border regions. However, during May and June there were a number of attacks on 6 RAR's positions.

Over the course of the deployment the battalion was involved in nine separate contacts, with a number of 6 RAR personnel being wounded. In one of these incidents, Sergeant David Hawkings was awarded the Distinguished Service Medal following an attack on 'B' Company's base at Aidabasalala on 21 June 2000.

As a result of these and attacks on other UN personnel including the attack that resulted in the death of a New Zealand soldier on 24 July, on 6 August RAR began a number of high-tempo operations to counter the activities of the militia in their area of operations. On 2 August, following intelligence reports that indicated that the militia were once again tracking the Australians, trackers found signs of further militia infiltration near Maliana. A platoon from 'A' Company, along with a number of troopers from the SASR were sent out to investigate, conducting a patrol about six kilometres from Maliana.

Further signs of infiltration were found by the lead section and as the scouts tracked the footprints of the militiamen through a dried creek bed they discovered some empty food packets and old cigarette butts, confirming the presence of militia in the area. As the platoon harboured up for a short halt, a sentry on one of the machine guns that had been sited for all round defence spotted a group of three militiamen patrolling along the creek bed and interpreting this as an act of aggression under the ROE governing the deployment he opened fire, hitting the lead militiaman with about twenty rounds from the LSW, killing him.

As the sentry began to engage a second target, a large of volume of fire began to pour in on the Australian position as a previously unseen group of militia joined in the engagement, returning fire while the first group began to withdraw. In an effort to cut off their withdrawal, the Australian platoon launched a quick attack on the militia positions, however, they were unable to prevent the militia from escaping. After the engagement, a second dead militiaman was discovered.

Four days later, on 6 August 2000, 6 RAR was involved in two more contacts, the first near Batugade and the second once again near Maliana. As a result of these contacts three militiamen were wounded, one of whom was captured. After this the militia turned their focus to other areas of operations, focusing mainly on the New Zealand area, where on 10 August, four Nepalese soldiers were wounded in two separate incidents, one of whom eventually died of his wounds.

Contacts with the militia continued throughout the deployment, however, as a result of the offensive carried out by 6 RAR, the battalion was able to maintain the tactical initiative and prevented the militia from achieving their stated aims of forcing the UN to withdraw from the country. Before they were relieved by 1 RAR in October 2000, the battalion also assisted in helping with the evacuation of UN and other personnel from Atambua in West Timor, as well as undertaking a host of CIMIC operations.

=== East Timor, 2003–2007 ===
6 RAR returned to East Timor in November 2003 as part of Operation Citadel, taking over as AUSBATT IX from 1 RAR. The task force consisted of just two rifle companies plus an armoured personnel carrier troop from the 2nd/14th Light Horse Regiment, a troop of Blackhawk helicopters from the 5th Aviation Regiment, an engineering troop from the 2nd Combat Engineer Regiment, a CIMIC team from the 1st Field Regiment and a surgical team from the 2nd Health Support Battalion.

The threat level in the country at the time was considerably less than the last time that 6 RAR units had deployed there, however, due to a decrease in the number of troops deployed and an expansion of the area in which they were required to operate, meant that the companies had to maintain a very high operational tempo throughout the seven-month tour. During this time they were largely deployed in AO Matilda, in the Bobonaro district, although they also had to cover the Liquica, Ermera, Ainaro, Cova Lima and Oecussi districts. This area had a population of over 400,000 people and had previously been covered by three full battalions.

This rotation was the last deployment under Operation Citadel. It was also the longest, a factor which led to the rotation of the force three months in. Advanced elements from 'D' Company deployed first, arriving ahead of the take over time in October. They were then followed by 'C' Company and then finally 'A' Company. Later in the deployment, as the other national forces that were deployed in Timor were drawn down, the battalion task force incorporated a Fijian company, leading to the battalion being renamed the WESTBATT. The force was commanded initially by Lieutenant Colonel Glen Babington and then later, in 2004, by Lieutenant Colonel Shane Caughey.

Due to the size of the area in which they were operating, a system of forward operating bases was established at Moleana, Aidabaleten and Gleno. From these bases the task force undertook a range of tasks including a mixture of highly visible peacekeeping operations, as well as less visible, clandestine surveillance tasks along the border. In June 2004 the AUSBATT/WESTBATT was withdrawn from East Timor and 6 RAR returned to Australia.

In November 2006, elements of 6 RAR were deployed to Timor Leste (as East Timor had become) as part of Operation Astute. This time they deployed alongside a platoon from 4 RAR, a company from 1 RAR, and 'G' Company which was a battery from the 16th Air Defence Regiment that had been re-roled as an infantry company.

=== Iraq, 2004–2008 ===
Elements of 6 RAR have deployed to Iraq three times as part of the SECDET based in Baghdad. The first deployment was from 'A' Company as part of SECDET 6 in 2004, followed by elements from 'C' Company which deployed on SECDET 7 in 2004–05. The last rotation was SECDET 12, which was based around elements from 'D' Company and deployed from September 2007 to March 2008.

A motorised combat team from 6 RAR was also deployed to Southern Iraq in support of Overwatch Battle Group West 4, OBG(W)4 from 4 November 2007 to June 2008. The deployment was led by the 2nd/14th Light Horse Regiment and operated in two different provinces.

=== Afghanistan, 2010 ===
Resupply convoy from MTF-1 in Afghanistan in 2010.

The battalion deployed to Afghanistan as part of Operation Slipper in 2010, with 6 RAR forming the basis of a 750-strong combined arms battle group consisting of infantry, engineers, cavalry, artillery and logistic elements drawn from the Brisbane-based 7th Brigade, known as the 1st Mentoring Task Force (MTF-1). Based at Forward Operation Base Ripley outside of Tarin Kowt, it was involved in counter-insurgency operations in Uruzgan province in conjunction United States, Dutch and other coalition forces, operating from a number of patrol bases in the Mirabad, Baluchi and Chora valleys.

Initially commanded by Lieutenant Colonel Jason Blain, the task force arrived in late January 2010 and was tasked with partnering the 4th Brigade, 205th Corps of the Afghan National Army. Blain subsequently handed over command to Lieutenant Colonel Mark Jennings on 21 June. MTF-1 operated throughout the province, with their area of operations extended west into the Tangi Valley following the Dutch withdrawal in August. Elements of the task force were later involved in heavy fighting at Derapet in Deh Rahwod on 24 August 2010.

During an eight-month deployment, the task force conducted over 1,700 patrols involving more than 560 small-arms fire incidents, and located over 100 improvised explosive devices (IEDs) and more than 250 weapons and explosives caches. Involved in sustained operations, MTF-1 suffered nearly 40 battle casualties, including six killed in action, the majority from IEDs. Returning to Australia in October and November 2010, it was later awarded a Meritorious Unit Citation (MUC) in 2011 Queen's Birthday Honours. On 20 November 2010, MTF-1 marched through Brisbane's central business district along with other deployed units from the 7th Brigade, as the returning soldiers were officially welcomed home in the biggest such parade since the end of the Vietnam War.

On 1 November 2012 Corporal Daniel Keighran from 6 RAR received the Victoria Cross for Australia for his actions in Afghanistan during the Battle of Derapet on 24 August 2010. His award was the first to a member of the Royal Australian Regiment.

== Current role and structure ==
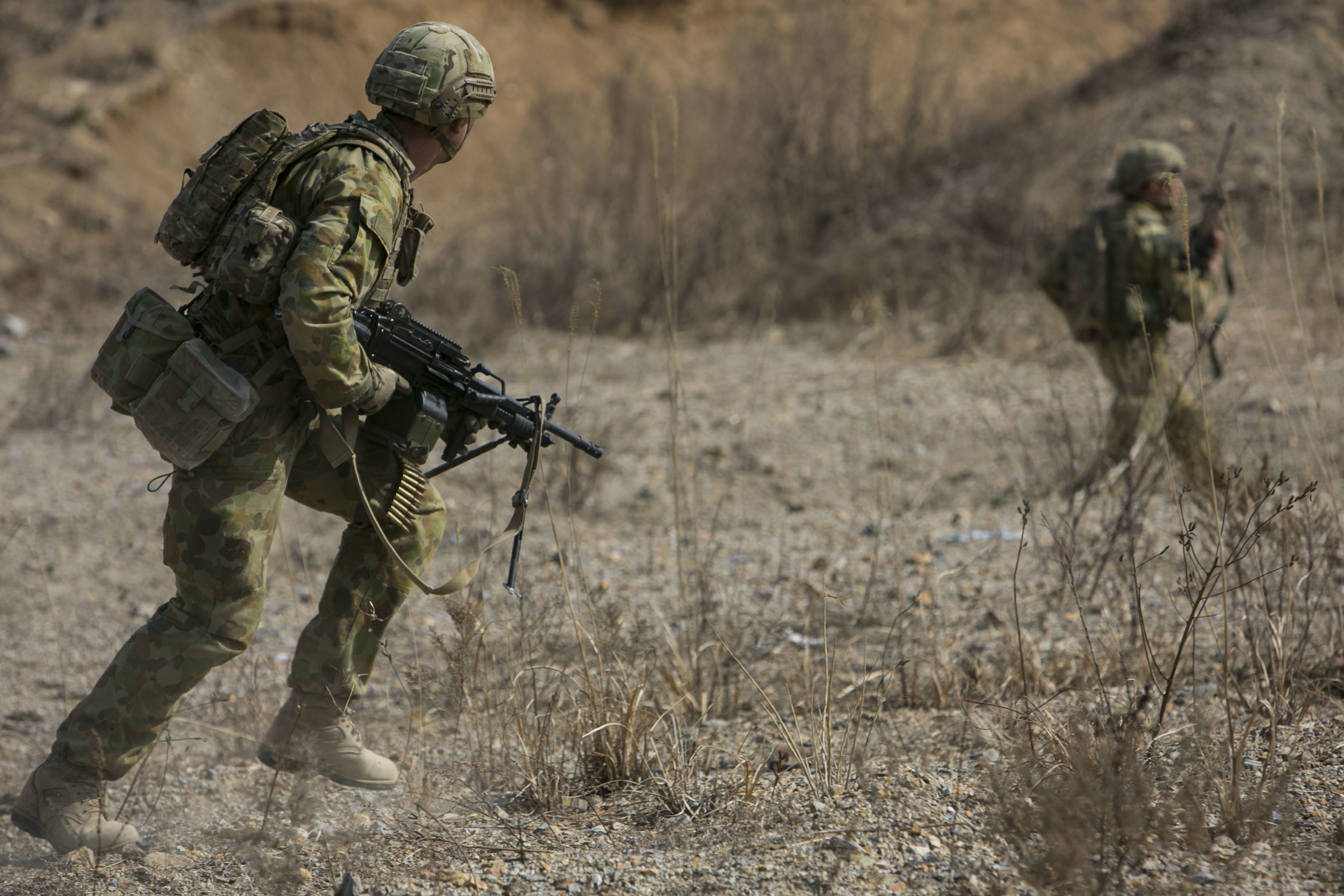
Soldiers from 'B' Company during an exercise in South Korea in 2016

In 2017 the battalion commenced the transition to the mechanised role with the adoption of the M113AS4 Armoured Personnel Carrier.

As of 14 November 2024, all M113AS4s were replaced with Bushmaster Protected Mobility Vehicle and its role changed to Motorised infantry

The battalion currently consists of:

- Battalion Headquarters
- 3 Rifle Companies – 'A', 'B', and 'D'
- Support Company
- Logistics Support Company

== Battle honours ==
- Vietnam: Vietnam 1965–66, Long Tan, Binh Ba, Vietnam 1969–70.

== Commanding officers ==
The following officers have served as commanding officer of 6RAR. Rank and honours are as at the individual's time in command.

Date commenced	Date ended	Commanding Officer
6 June 1965	7 January 1968	Lieutenant Colonel Colin Townsend, DSO
8 January 1968	31 May 1970	Lieutenant Colonel David Butler
1 June 1970	December 1972	Lieutenant Colonel David Drabsch, MBE
December 1972	March 1974	Lieutenant Colonel John Healy
April 1974	July 1975	Lieutenant Colonel Anthony Hammett
July 1975	January 1978	Lieutenant Colonel Peter Stokes
January 1978	December 1979	Lieutenant Colonel Michael Harris, MC
December 1979	January 1982	Lieutenant Colonel Andrew Mattay
January 1982	December 1983	Lieutenant Colonel Peter Langford
January 1984	December 1985	Lieutenant Colonel Adrian d'Hagé, MC
January 1986	December 1987	Lieutenant Colonel Leonard Studley
December 1987	December 1989	Lieutenant Colonel David Mead
January 1990	December 1991	Lieutenant Colonel Jim Molan
January 1992	December 1993	Lieutenant Colonel Mark Evans
January 1994	December 1995	Lieutenant Colonel Gregory Baker
December 1995	December 1997	Lieutenant Colonel Stephen Dunn
December 1997	December 1999	Lieutenant Colonel John Edwards
December 1999	December 2001	Lieutenant Colonel Michael Moon, DSC
January 2002	January 2004	Lieutenant Colonel Glen Babington
January 2004	January 2006	Lieutenant Colonel Shane Caughey, CSC
January 2006	December 2007	Lieutenant Colonel S. C. Goddard
December 2007	January 2010	Lieutenant Colonel Jason Blain, CSC
January 2010	December 2013	Lieutenant Colonel Mark Jennings, CSC
December 2013	December 2015	Lieutenant Colonel Justin Elwin
December 2015	December 2017	Lieutenant Colonel James Hunter
December 2017	December 2019	Lieutenant Colonel Justin Bywater
December 2019	December 2020	Lieutenant Colonel Simon Croft
December 2020	December 2023	Lieutenant Colonel Richard Niessl
December 2023	December 2025	Lieutenant Colonel Edouard Cousins
December 2025	Current	Lieutenant Colonel Emlyn Mordike

== Regimental Sergeant Majors ==
The following table lists the Regimental Sergeant Majors of 6 RAR. Rank and honours are as at the individual's time in command.

Date commenced	Date ended	Regimental Sergeants Major
June 1965	September 1967	WO1 G. Chinn, DCM
September 1967	June 1970	WO1 J.A. Cruickshank, MBE
June 1970	January 1974	WO1 K.F. Davidson
January 1974	June 1975	WO1 K.D. Stockley
June 1975	March 1977	WO1 J Husband, BEM, OAM
March 1977	February 1980	WO1 N.R. Eiby, OAM
February 1980	August 1981	WO1 L.B. O'Sullivan
August 1981	December 1983	WO1 M.J. Poole
December 1983	December 1984	WO1 G.E. Bland
December 1984	December 1986	WO1 J.W. Burns OAM
December 1986	November 1988	WO1 R.J. Brittain
November 1988	November 1990	WO1 P.G. Stammers, CSM
November 1990	December 1992	WO1 G.C. Dyer, OAM
December 1992	December 1993	WO1 C.N. Goodwin
December 1993	December 1995	WO1 S. Purdie OAM
December 1995	December 1997	WO1 M.R. Bishop, OAM
December 1997	December 1999	WO1 M.G. Maunder
December 1999	January 2002	WO1 D. Ashley OAM
January 2002	January 2004	WO1 K.P. O'Brien, OAM
January 2004	January 2006	WO1 W.J. Giddings
January 2006	December 2007	WO1 B.N. Walker, OAM
December 2007	January 2010	WO1 S. Colman OAM
January 2010	December 2011	WO1 B. Brown OAM
December 2011	December 2014	WO1 D. Bromwich CSM
December 2014	December 2016	WO1 C. Batty OAM
December 2016	December 2018	WO1 M. Groves
January 2019	January 2021	WO1 S. Logan
January 2021	January 2023	WO1 J. M. Lines MG
January 2023	December 2024	WO1 M. Keefe
December 2024	Current	WO1 D. McCoy CSM

== See also ==
- Military history of Australia
- Royal Australian Regiment
