= Albert Cleary =

Australian Army soldier

Albert Neil Cleary
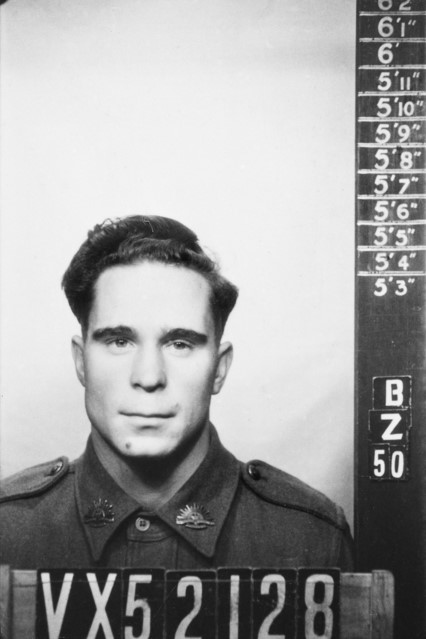
- Cleary upon enlistment
- Born: 16 June 1919; Geelong, Victoria
- Died: 20 March 1945 (aged 25); Sandakan, Borneo
- Burial place: Labuan War Cemetery
- Military career
- Allegiance: Australia
- Branch: Second Australian Imperial Force
- Service years: 1941–1945
- Rank: Gunner
- Service number: VX52128
- Unit: 2/15th Field Regiment
- Conflicts: World War II; South West Pacific theatre; Battle of Singapore (POW)
- Awards: Commendation for Gallantry

Albert Neil Cleary (16 June 1919 – 20 March 1945) was an Australian soldier during World War II. Part of the 2/15th Field Regiment, Royal Australian Artillery, he became a prisoner of war to the Japanese following the Battle of Singapore. He died following an escape attempt in 1945. In 2001, the Australian Labor Party introduced a bill to have Cleary and two others awarded the Victoria Cross for Australia, however this was defeated by the Federal Liberal Government. In 2011, Cleary was awarded a posthumous Commendation for Gallantry. Cleary's death was revealed by historian Lynette Silver to have been caused by dysentery, calling into doubt his elevation as a war hero.
