= Mentoring Task Force One =

Australian Army task force during the War in Afghanistan

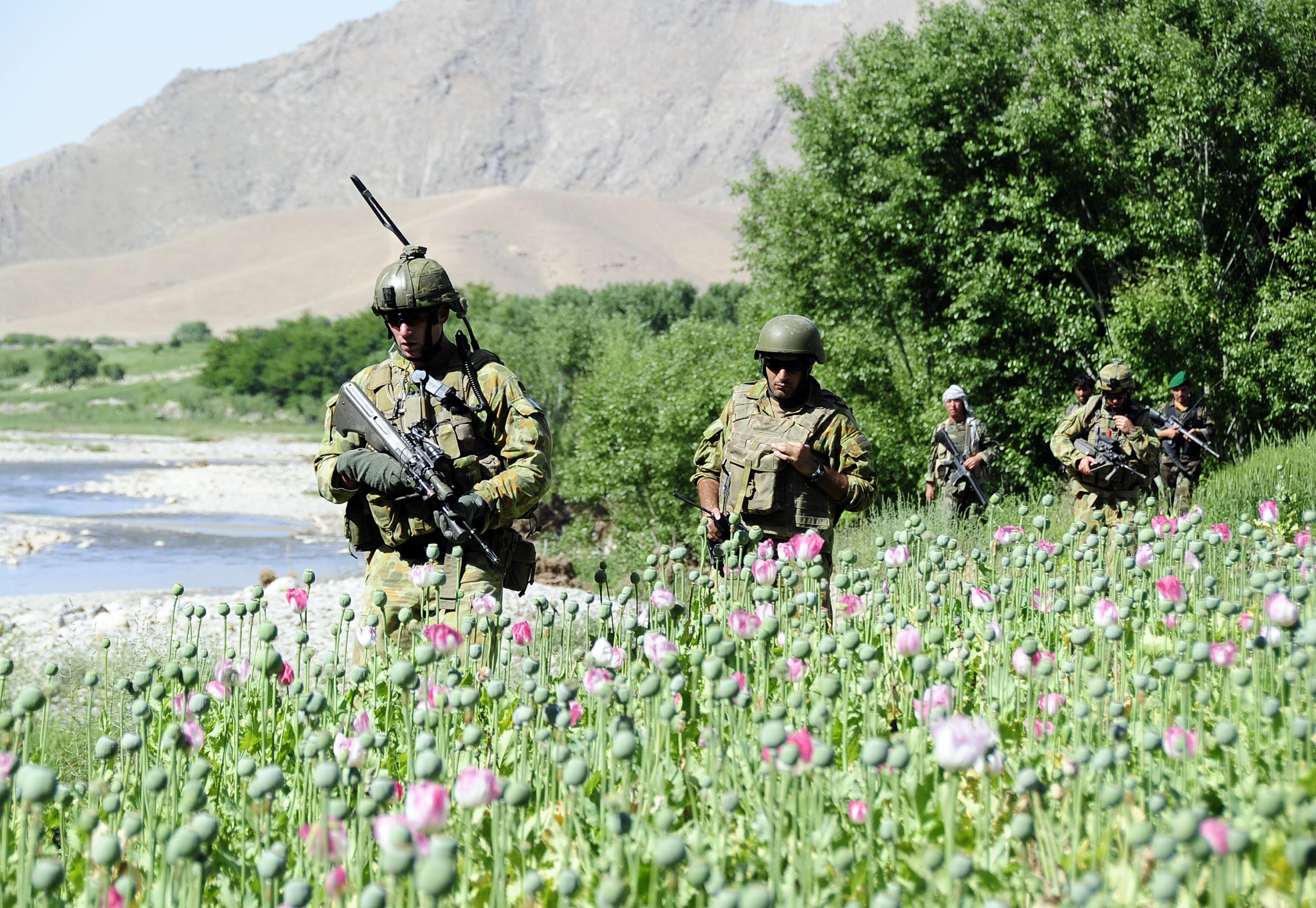
- MTF-1 and Afghan soldiers patrol through a poppy field in April 2010
- Active: 2009–2010
- Country: Australia
- Branch: Army
- Type: Combined arms battle group
- Size: 750 personnel
- Part of: Combined Team Uruzgan
- Garrison/HQ: Forward Operating Base Ripley, Tarin Kowt
- Engagements: War in Afghanistan: Battle of Derapet
- Decorations: Meritorious Unit Citation

Mentoring Task Force One (MTF-1) was a combined arms battle group formed by the Australian Army for deployment as part of Operation Slipper during the War in Afghanistan. Formed in 2009 from the 7th Brigade, the unit consisted of infantry, engineers, cavalry, artillery and logistic elements from 55 different units, but was predominately based on the 6th Battalion, Royal Australian Regiment (6 RAR). Based at Forward Operating Base Ripley outside of Tarin Kowt in Uruzgan Province as part of a multinational brigade known as Combined Team Uruzgan, MTF-1 was tasked with counter-insurgency operations in conjunction with United States, Dutch and other coalition forces, operating from a number of patrol bases in the Mirabad, Baluchi and Chora valleys. MTF-1 served in Afghanistan from January to October 2010.

== History ==
Formed in 2009 for deployment as part of Operation Slipper during the War in Afghanistan, Mentoring Task Force One (MTF-1) was raised from the Brisbane-based 7th Brigade. The 750-strong combined arms battle group consisted of infantry, engineers, cavalry, artillery and logistic elements from 55 different units, but was primarily based on the 6th Battalion, Royal Australian Regiment (6 RAR). Based at Forward Operating Base Ripley outside of Tarin Kowt in Uruzgan Province as part of a multinational brigade known as Combined Team Uruzgan, MTF-1 was tasked with counter-insurgency operations in conjunction United States, Dutch and other coalition forces, operating from a number of patrol bases in the Mirabad, Baluchi and Chora valleys.

After completing mission-specific training in Australia, MTF-1 arrived in Afghanistan in January 2010. Initially commanded by Lieutenant Colonel Jason Blain, MTF-1 formally took over responsibility for the area of operations (AO) from Mentoring and Reconstruction Task Force Two in February. Partnered with the 4th Brigade, 205th Corps of the Afghan National Army (ANA), MTF-1 operated throughout Uruzgan Province, with their AO extended west into the Tangi Valley following the Dutch withdrawal in August, while it also provided convoy escort and force protection in support of ANA resupply convoys into neighboring Kandahar Province. After the Dutch withdrawal, MTF-1 assumed responsibility for the Operational Coordination Centre - Provincial (OCCP) which reported to OCCR South to coordinate whole of government delivery of security, development and governance in partnership with the Governor. The Australian led OCCP managed Provincial planning and execution of all activities and elections, the coalition alignment (US/ANP, AUS/ANA, AFP, NDS etc), Provincial Governor development activities in the districts and coordination of UNDP/NGOs aligned to local aspirations. Meanwhile, following a change in command Blain subsequently handed over to Lieutenant Colonel Mark Jennings on 21 June 2010.

Resupply convoy from MTF-1 in Afghanistan in 2010.

During its eight-month deployment MTF-1 conducted over 1,700 patrols involving more than 560 small-arms fire incidents, locating over 100 improvised explosive devices (IEDs) and more than 250 weapons and explosives caches. Involved in sustained operations, MTF-1 suffered nearly 40 battle casualties, including six killed in action, the majority from IEDs. While attached to MTF-1, soldiers from Combat Team Delta (based on D Company, 6 RAR) took part in heavy fighting during the Battle of Derapet in Deh Rahwod on 24 August 2010, sustaining one killed. Corporal Daniel Keighran was later awarded the Victoria Cross for Australia for his role in the battle, the first member of the Royal Australian Regiment to receive such an award.

MTF-1 handed over authority to Mentoring Task Force Two and returned to Australia in October and November 2010. On 20 November, the task force marched through Brisbane's central business district along with other deployed units from the 7th Brigade, as the returning soldiers were officially welcomed home in the biggest such parade since the end of the Vietnam War. MTF-1 was subsequently awarded the Meritorious Unit Citation in the 2011 Queen's Birthday Honours for "sustained outstanding service in warlike operations on Operation Slipper in Uruzgan Province, Afghanistan, between 20 January and 30 October 2010". A number of other members of the task force were also decorated for their service with MTF-1, including both Blain and Jennings, who were each awarded the Distinguished Service Cross.
