= Daniel Keighran =

Australian soldier VC (b.1983)

Daniel Keighran VC
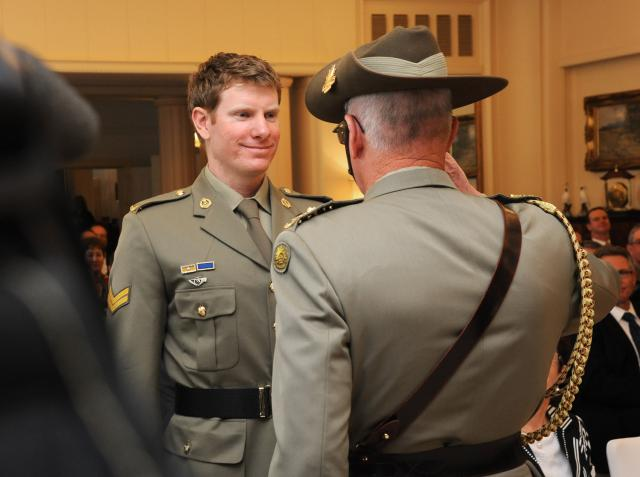
- Keighran being saluted by General David Hurley after receiving the Victoria Cross for Australia in 2012.
- Born: 18 June 1983 (age 43); Nambour, Queensland
- Military career
- Allegiance: Australia
- Branch: Australian Army (2000–2011); Australian Army Reserve (2011–present)
- Service years: 2000–present
- Rank: Corporal
- Units: 6th Battalion, Royal Australian Regiment (2001–2011); 11th/28th Battalion, Royal Western Australia Regiment (2011–2014); Army Headquarters (2018–present)
- Conflicts: East Timor (UNMISET); Iraq War; War in Afghanistan; Battle of Derapet
- Awards: Victoria Cross for Australia

Daniel Alan Keighran, VC (born 18 June 1983) is an Australian soldier and a recipient of the Victoria Cross for Australia, the highest award in the Australian honours system. Keighran was awarded the Victoria Cross for Australia for his actions in the Battle of Derapet on 24 August 2010, during the War in Afghanistan. He was presented with the medal by the Governor-General of Australia, Quentin Bryce, at a ceremony in Canberra on 1 November 2012. Keighran is the third soldier to be awarded the Victoria Cross for Australia, (Note: Prior to 1991, Australians were awarded the "Imperial" Victoria Cross, the last recipient being Keith Payne in 1969. The Victoria Cross for Australia was created in 1991 as a national replacement to the original medal, and was first awarded in 2009 to Mark Donaldson, the second in 2011 to Ben Roberts-Smith and the fourth posthumously in 2014 to Cameron Baird.) and the first member of the Royal Australian Regiment so awarded.

== Early life ==
Keighran (pronounced: KEAR-ran) was born in Nambour, in the Sunshine Coast hinterland region of Queensland, on 18 June 1983. When Keighran was in Year 5, he moved with his family to Lowmead, approximately 80 kilometres (50 mi) north west of the Queensland regional city of Bundaberg. His family lived on a "forty-acre block" where his parents bred paint horses. His mother also taught dressage, and his father occasionally organised rodeo events. Keighran attended school in nearby Rosedale and graduated from high school in 2000. That year Keighran was a torchbearer for the 2000 Summer Olympics torch parade and received a Pierre de Coubertin Award in recognition of his "Olympic spirit".

== Military career ==
Keighran joined the Australian Army in 2000. Prior to Afghanistan, he had served in East Timor and Iraq. He was promoted to lance corporal in 2005 while within Mortar Platoon of the Support Company, 6th Battalion, Royal Australian Regiment (6 RAR). In 2006 he deployed to Iraq as a Bushmaster Protected Mobility Vehicle driver, and in 2007 to Afghanistan with the Special Operations Task Group in the same role. He was promoted to corporal in 2009, and was posted to D Company, 6 RAR.

=== Victoria Cross for Australia ===
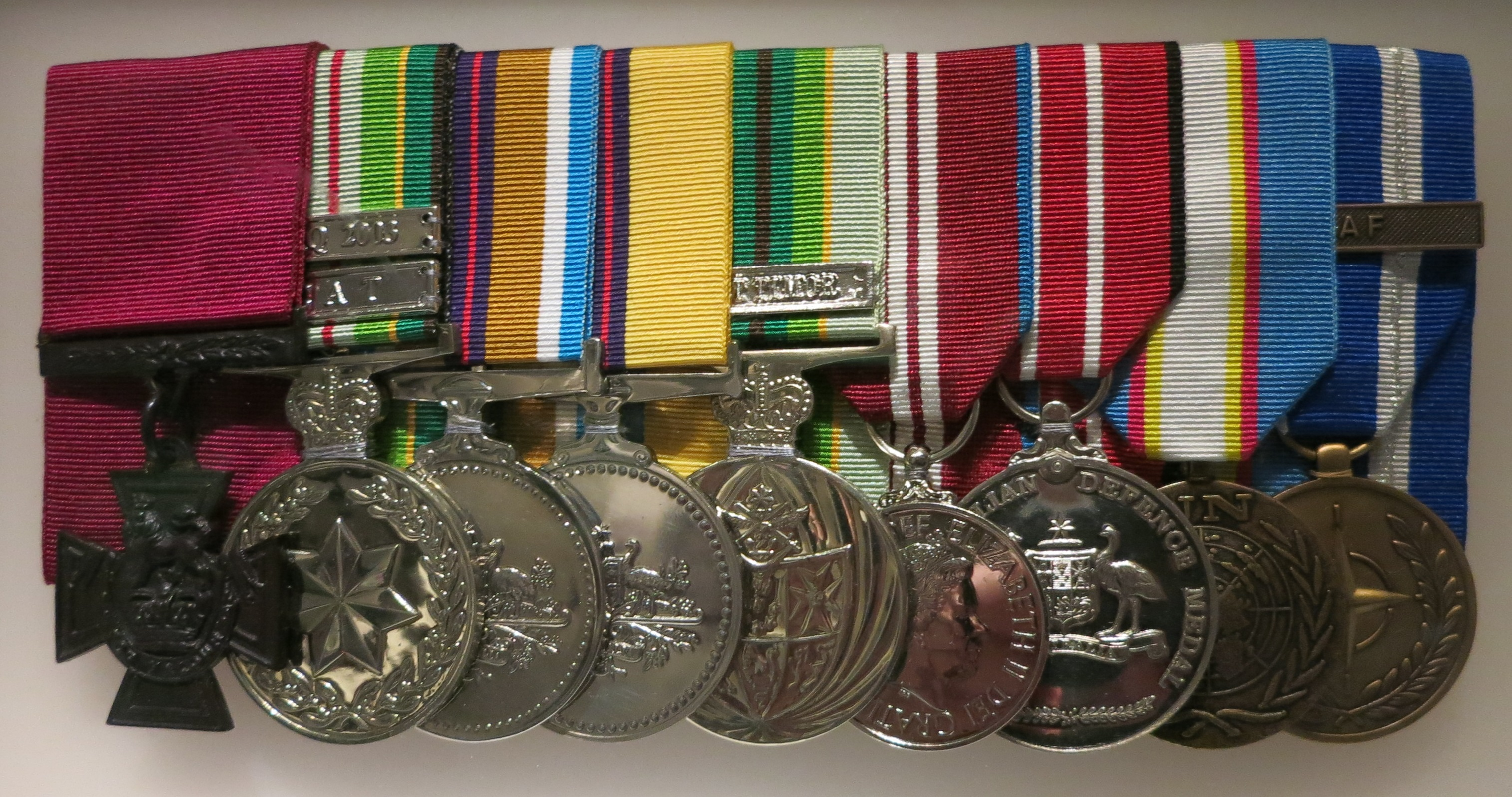
Some of Keighran's medals on display at the Australian War Memorial

Keighran was awarded the Victoria Cross for his actions while serving with the 6th Battalion, Royal Australian Regiment, in a fire fight with insurgents during the Battle of Derapet on 24 August 2010, an action of Operation Slipper.

During the battle, Keighran "with complete disregard for his own safety" repeatedly exposed himself to enemy fire to draw fire away from a team treating a battle casualty (Keighran's friend Lance Corporal Jared MacKinney). Keighran's actions were key in allowing the Coalition forces to withdraw without further casualties.

He represented recipients at the 2023 Coronation.

== Post-military career ==
As of 2012, Keighran served in the Australian Army Reserve posted to Army Headquarters. His civilian career was in the mining industry in Kalgoorlie, Western Australia, where he worked in the Frog's Leg Gold Mine until early 2015.

After receiving the Victoria Cross for Australia, Keighran completed an MBA. As of 2024, he and his family were living in Brisbane and Keighran was employed in a senior role in a multinational defence company.

== Honours and awards ==
Keighran's Victoria Cross for Australia and accompanying medal group are on loan to the Australian War Memorial for display in the Hall of Valour. Keighran from 2001 until 2011 wore the Presidential Unit Citation awarded by the United States. (Note: The Presidential Unit Citation (PUC) awarded by the United States can be seen worn by Daniel Keighran in photos from his Victoria Cross for Australia award ceremony. The PUC was awarded the D Company, 6th Battalion, Royal Australian Regiment, during the Vietnam War. As a result members of D Company can wear the decoration on their uniform whilst a member of that unit. Only members of D Company during the time of the award are permitted to continue wearing the PUC after leaving the unit. Now that Daniel Keighran is a member of Army Headquarters he has ceased to wear the decoration.)

In 2024 Keighran decided to sell his medals, including the Victoria Cross for Australia, to pay for a new house and help cover his family's living expenses.

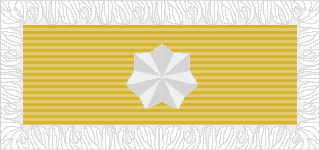
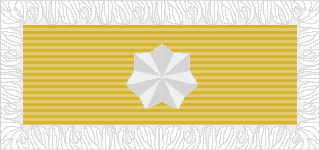

Ribbon	Description	Notes
Ribbon of the Victoria Cross for Australia	Victoria Cross for Australia (VC)	"For the most conspicuous acts of gallantry and extreme devotion to duty in action in circumstances of great peril at Derapet, Uruzgan province, Afghanistan, as part of the Mentoring Task Force One on Operation SLIPPER" on 24 August 2010."
Ribbon of the AASM	Australian Active Service Medal	with clasps for ICAT and IRAQ 2003
Ribbon of the Afghanistan Medal for Australia	Afghanistan Medal	Operation Slipper
Ribbon of the Iraq Medal for Australia	Iraq Medal	Operation Catalyst
Ribbon of the Australian Service Medal	Australian Service Medal	with East Timor clasp (UNMISET)
Ribbon of the Queen Elizabeth II Diamond Jubilee Medal	Queen Elizabeth II Diamond Jubilee Medal	1 December 2012
Ribbon of the Queen Elizabeth II Platinum Jubilee Medal	Queen Elizabeth II Platinum Jubilee Medal	29 November 2022
Ribbon of the King Charles III Coronation Medal	King Charles III Coronation Medal	2 May 2024
Ribbon of the Defence Long Service Medal	Defence Long Service Medal with one clasp	for 20 years service
Ribbon of the Australian Defence Medal	Australian Defence Medal	
Ribbon of the United Nations Medal (UNMISET)	United Nations Medal	with ribbon for active service with Operation Citadel in Timor Leste (UNMISET)
Ribbon of the NATO Medal for ISAF	NATO Medal for the Non-Article 5 ISAF Operation in Afghanistan	with ISAF clasp
Meritorious Unit Citation	Meritorious Unit Citation with Federation Star	Awarded to Mentoring Task Force One in the 2011 Queen's Birthday Honours
Meritorious Unit Citation	Meritorious Unit Citation with Federation Star	Awarded to Task Force 66 in the 2015 Australia Day Honours
	Infantry Combat Badge	
