= 2022 Special Honours (Australia) =

The Special Honours Lists for Australia are announced by the Sovereign and Governor-General at any time.

Some honours are awarded by other countries where Queen Elizabeth II (until 8 September 2022) and King Charles III (from 8 September 2022) is the Head of State and Australians receiving those honours are listed here with the relevant reference.

This list also incorporates the Mid Winters Day honours list and the Bravery honours lists.

== Life Peer ==
- Sir Michael Hintze, AM – to be Baron Hintze – 3 November 2022

== Knight Bachelor ==
Knight Bachelor ribbon

- Pascal Claude Roland Soriot – 1 June 2022 – chief executive officer, AstraZeneca plc. For services to UK Life Sciences and the Response to COVID-19. Awarded as part of the United Kingdom's 2022 Birthday Honours list.

== Order of Australia ==
Ribbon bar of the Order of Australia (General)

Ribbon bar of the Order of Australia (Military)

=== Companion (AC) ===
Honorary General

- Sir Barry Gibb CBE – 27 January 2022 – For eminent service to the performing arts as a musician, songwriter and record producer, to the advancement of Australian music artists, and to philanthropy.
- Charles Francis Feeney – 10 August 2022 – For eminent service and contributions to philanthropy, particularly to Australia's health, research and higher education sectors.
- Maestro Zubin Mehta – 16 August 2022 – For eminent service to the Australia-India bilateral relationship and humanity-at-large, particularly in the fields of classical music and philanthropy.
- The Late Shinzo Abe – 31 August 2022 – For eminent service to the Australia-Japan bilateral relationship.

=== Officer (AO) ===
Honorary Military

- Admiral General Teodoro Esteban López Calderón – 3 May 2022 – For distinguished service in strengthening the defence relationship between Australia and Spain through personal commitment, engagement and support to Australia.
- General Kōji Yamazaki – 18 May 2022 – For distinguished service to strengthening the defence relationship between Australia and Japan through commitment, leadership and strategic foresight as Chief of Ground Staff, and Chief of Staff, Joint Staff of the Japan Self-Defense Forces.
- Air Marshal Kevin Short – 6 July 2022 – For distinguished service in fostering the military relationship between Australia and New Zealand through exceptional leadership, unwavering commitment, strategic foresight and uncompromising professionalism.
- General Andika Perkasa – 22 November 2022 – For distinguished service as the Chief of Staff of the Indonesian Army in enhancing the relationship and interoperability between the Australian Army and the Indonesian Army.

Honorary General

- Haruhisa Handa – 26 May 2022 – For distinguished service to the arts, education and sport through philanthropic contributions.
- Toshiaki Kitamura – 26 May 2022 – For significant service to the trade and investment relationship between Australia and Japan.

=== Member (AM) ===
Honorary Military

- Admiral Yudo Margono – 3 May 2022 – For exceptional service in strengthening the Australian and Indonesian ties through promotion and enhancement of the bilateral relationship between the Royal Australian Navy and the Indonesian Navy.

Honorary General

- Veronica Nicole Comyn – 26 May 2022 – For significant service to Australia's bilateral relationship with France, particularly through the enhancement of trade and business links.
- Amit Dasgupta – 10 August 2022 – For service to the Australia-India bilateral relationship.
- Dr Patricia Moira Moore – 24 August 2022 – For significant service to women's reproductive health in Australia.
- Alexander Johannes Hug – 31 August 2022 – For significant service to Australian authorities following the crash of Malaysia Airlines Flight MH17 in eastern Ukraine.
- Josephine Linden – 28 September 2022 – For significant service to the Australia-United States of America bilateral relationship, the international banking and financial sector, and to the professional development of Australians abroad.
- Professor Paul Kane – 28 October 2022 – For significant service to literature, particularly through the promotion of Australian arts, poetry, and emerging talent.
- Debra Sue Scholl – 28 October 2022 – For significant contributions to advancing and promoting Indigenous Australian art, culture and knowledge in the United States of America.
- Dennis Scholl – 28 October 2022 – For significant contributions to advancing and promoting Indigenous Australian art, culture and knowledge in the United States of America.

=== Medal (OAM) ===
Honorary General

- Barry Barnes – 27 January 2022 – For service to commemorating the service of Australian Flying Corps in Tetbury, England, and surrounding areas, during World War One.
- Gilbert Brogden – 27 January 2022 – For service to the community, particularly through volunteering and fundraising for local and national charity organisations.
- Shirley Connolly – 27 January 2022 – For service to netball, particularly in the Macarthur region of NSW.
- Christine Forsyth – 27 January 2022 – For service to the Wollombi Valley region, particularly through sporting, arts and community organisations.
- Wayne Lindsay – 27 January 2022 – For service to the Australian and New Zealand veterans community.
- Yoshiko Kuwazawa – 8 May 2022 – For service to the Australian Government at the Embassy of Australia in Tokyo, Japan.
- Dato Lim Kian Hock – 8 July 2022 – For service to Australia-Malaysia relations, particularly to commemorating the role played by Australians in Sarawak, Malaysia, during World War II.
- Lionel Léonard Lamotte – 5 October 2022 – For service to Australian-French relations, particularly in commemorating the role played by Australians in the defence of France during World War I.

== Order of the British Empire ==
Ribbon bar of the Order of the British Empire (civil)

=== Officer (OBE) ===
- John Dauth, AO, LVO – 1 June 2022 – Vice Chair, Board of Trustees, British Red Cross. For voluntary service to the British Red Cross. Awarded as part of the United Kingdom's 2022 Birthday Honours list.

=== Member (MBE) ===
- Adam Hills – 31 December 2021 – for services to Paralympic sport and disability awareness. Awarded as part of the United Kingdom's 2022 New Year Honours list.

== Royal Victorian Order ==
Main: Royal Victorian Order

Ribbon bar of the Royal Victorian Order

=== Member (MVO) ===
- Mark Joseph Evans, Estate Manager, Government House, Perth, Australia. Awarded as part of the United Kingdom's 2022 New Year Honours list.
- Group Captain David Scott Glasson, Honorary Military Secretary to the Governor of New South Wales, Australia. Awarded as part of the United Kingdom's 2022 New Year Honours list.

== Order of St John ==
Order of St John ribbon

=== Dame of the Order of St John ===
- The Hon. Jeannette Young, AC, PSM – 21 October 2022

== Distinguished Service Cross (DSC) ==
Ribbon bar of the Distinguished Service Cross

- Colonel John Howard Kemp, AM – 6 July 2022 – For distinguished command and leadership in warlike operations of 1st Field Squadron Group Vietnam between 1 November 1967 and 12 November 1968.

== Bar to the Bravery Medal (BM and Bar) ==
- Timothy James Brown, BM

== Bravery Medal (BM) ==
Ribbon bar of the Bravery Medal

- Petty Officer Arthur Amies, Royal Australian Navy – Petty Officer Arthur Amies displayed considerable bravery during the attempted rescue of a person from a burning house at Greenwell Point, New South Wales on 3 June 2017.
- Andrew James Black - Mr Andrew Black displayed considerable bravery during the rescue of people from a burning vehicle near Invergordon, Victoria on 26 October 2015.
- Renzo Bruschi - Mr Renzo Bruschi displayed considerable bravery during the rescue of people following a petrol tanker accident in Melbourne, Victoria on 24 May 2016.
- Chief Petty Officer Liam Carruthers, Royal Australian Navy - Chief Petty Officer Liam Carruthers displayed considerable bravery during the attempted rescue of a person from a burning house at Greenwell Point, New South Wales on 3 June 2017.
- Detective Senior Constable Samuel Joseph Clarkson, Victoria Police - Detective Senior Constable Samuel Clarkson displayed considerable bravery during the rescue of a person from a burning house in Bellfield, Victoria on 10 February 2018.
- Gyles Bray Deacon - Mr Gyles Deacon displayed considerable bravery during the rescue of a fisherman from rocks at Wombarra, New South Wales on 24 June 2020.
- Allan Lyndon Drechsler - Mr Allan Drechsler displayed considerable bravery during the apprehension of an armed offender at Neds Corner, Victoria on 19 October 2017.
- David Michael Farcich - Mr David Farcich displayed considerable bravery during the rescue of people from burning vehicles in Breton Bay, Western Australia on 27 August 2019.
- Russell Irwin - Mr Russell Irwin displayed considerable bravery during an armed home invasion in Cranbourne North, Victoria on 1 February 2021.
- Craig Jeffrey O'Brien - Mr Craig O'Brien displayed considerable bravery during the rescue of a woman from a house fire at Park Avenue, Queensland on 3 February 2020.
- Alex Oliver - Mr Alex Oliver displayed considerable bravery during the rescue of a surfer following a shark attack at Bunker Bay, Western Australia on 31 July 2020.
- Father Liam Ryan - Father Liam Ryan displayed considerable bravery during the rescue of a surfer following a shark attack at Bunker Bay, Western Australia on 31 July 2020.
- Clayton James Schilg - Mr Clayton Schilg displayed considerable bravery during the rescue of people from a rip at Wooyung Beach near Pottsville, New South Wales on 9 January 2020.
- Tyler James White - Mr Tyler White displayed considerable bravery during the rescue of a man from the Canning River in Perth, Western Australia on 25 January 2020.
- Jess Woolhouse - Mr Jess Woolhouse displayed considerable bravery during the rescue of a surfer following a shark attack at Bunker Bay, Western Australia on 31 July 2020.
- The late Ellen Francis Cartwright
- Te Reo Potaka Kenneth Haronga
- Georgina Cris Mills
- Calan James Moss
- Shane Paul Williams
- William Eric Yabsley

== Royal Victorian Medal (RVM) ==
Ribbon bar of the Royal Victorian Medal

Silver

- Trevor John Pope, Gardener, Government House, Perth, Western Australia. Awarded as part of the United Kingdom's 2022 New Year Honours list.
- Ross Frederick Wheatley, Ranger, Government House, Perth, Western Australia. Awarded as part of the United Kingdom's 2022 Birthday Honours list.

== Commendation for Gallantry ==
Ribbon bar of the Commendation for Gallantry

- Major Alan Mull – 6 July 2022 – For acts of gallantry in action following capture by the Imperial Japanese Army on 15 February 1942 until his execution as a result of an escape attempt on 10 March 1943.

== Commendation for Brave Conduct ==
Ribbon bar of the Commendation for Brave Conduct

- Kerrod Alan Andrews - Mr Kerrod Andrews is commended for brave conduct for his actions during an altercation outside a supermarket in Cooktown, Queensland on 15 May 2018.
- Senior Constable Ryan Nicholas Badger, Queensland Police - Senior Constable Ryan Badger is commended for brave conduct for his actions during the rescue of a man from dangerous surf at Surfers Paradise, Queensland on 12 February 2015.
- Fabio Contu - Mr Fabio Contu is commended for brave conduct for his actions during an incident on an aircraft near Melbourne, Victoria on 31 May 2017.
- Christian Cullen - Mr Christian Cullen is commended for brave conduct for his actions after a boy fell down a ravine on Tamborine Mountain in Queensland on 14 March 2020.
- Richard Davies - Mr Richard Davies is commended for brave conduct for his actions during the rescue of man caught in a rip at Lilli Pilli, New South Wales on 21 February 2021.
- Peter Murray Edwards - Mr Peter Edwards is commended for brave conduct for his actions during an incident on a ferry on the Yarra River at Southbank, Victoria on 19 August 2014.
- Dean Charles Engwirda - Mr Dean Engwirda is commended for brave conduct for his actions during an altercation outside a supermarket in Cooktown, Queensland on 15 May 2018.
- Paul Maxwell Ewert - Mr Paul Ewert is commended for brave conduct for his actions during the rescue of a person from a burning vehicle near Invergordon, Victoria on 26 October 2015.
- Senior Constable Jessica Kate Forcey, Victoria Police - Senior Constable Jessica Forcey is commended for brave conduct for her actions during the rescue of a man from rough seas in Frankston, Victoria on 30 June 2019.
- Steven David Harwood - Mr Steven Harwood is commended for brave conduct for his actions during the rescue of an elderly woman from a house fire in Yangebup, Western Australia on 15 February 2018.
- Troy Raymond Joyner - Mr Troy Joyner is commended for brave conduct for his actions during an incident on an aircraft near Melbourne, Victoria on 31 May 2017.
- Constance McAllister - Mrs Constance McAllister is commended for brave conduct for her actions during the rescue of an elderly man from a burning house in Mundubbera, Queensland on 22 July 2020.
- Sergeant Julie Susan Morris, Victoria Police - Sergeant Julie Morris is commended for brave conduct for her actions during the rescueof a man from rough seas in Frankston, Victoria on 21 November 2019.
- Mathew James O'Brien - Mr Mathew O'Brien is commended for brave conduct for his actions during the rescue of a woman from a house fire at Park Avenue, Queensland on 3 February 2020.
- Mathew Reeves - Mr Mathew Reeves is commended for brave conduct for his actions during the rescue of a man from dangerous surf at Surfers Paradise, Queensland on 12 February 2015.
- Navonkar Singh - Mr Navonkar Singh is commended for brave conduct for his actions after his semi-trailer caught fire at a service station in McDougalls Hill, New South Wales on 6 December 2019.
- Holli Thersey Spence - Miss Holli Spence is commended for brave conduct for her actions during the rescue of a young woman in Hervey Bay, Queensland.
- Finley William Taylor - Mr Finley Taylor is commended for brave conduct for his actions during the rescue of a man from dangerous surf at Surfers Paradise beach in Queensland on 12 February 2015.
- Shane Paul Wilkins - Mr Shane Wilkins is commended for brave conduct for his actions during the rescue of an elderly woman from a house fire in Yangebup, Western Australia on 15 February 2018.
- Christopher James Wilton - Mr Christopher Wilton is commended for brave conduct for his actions during the rescue of a woman from a burning vehicle in Dandenong, Victoria on 3 September 2015.
- Dean Richard Barrett
- Jesse Carter
- Cameron Lee Denman
- Dean Douglass Gollan
- Corporal Hayden Guilfoyle, Australian Army
- Paul Trevor Kinnear
- Mark Alan Lush
- Andrew Ormsby
- Harley Maris Schmith
- Sukhbir Singh Seehra
- Sandra Solty
- Emmanuel Vassallo
- Steven John Willdern

== Group Bravery Citation ==
The recipients are recognised with the award of the Group Bravery Citation for their actions during the rescue of people from burning vehicles in Breton Bay, Western Australia on 27 August 2019.

- Paul Redmond Connolly
- Senior Constable Reece Colin Easther, Western Australia Police
- David Michael Farcich
- Senior Constable Bevan Troy Rankin, Western Australia Police
- Robin Michelle Turner

The recipients are recognised with the award of the Group Bravery Citation for their actions during an incident on an aircraft near Melbourne, Victoria on 31 May 2017.

- Fabio Contu
- Troy Raymond Joyner

The recipients are recognised with the award of the Group Bravery Citation for their actions during the rescue of people during a flash flood at Wilsons Promontory National Park, Victoria on 22 March 2011.

- David Andrew Bone
- Stephen Gary Burns
- Darren Hill
- Daniel Hudson
- Melissa Moon
- Jack Schulz
- Baden Williams

The following recipients are recognised with the award of the Group Bravery Citation for their actions during a rescue of a woman being assaulted in Brunswick, Victoria on 24 April 2016.

- Jeremy McLeod
- Andrew Melville Pappas
- Ben Jonathan Russell

The following recipients are recognised with the award of the Group Bravery Citation for their actions taken during a flood rescue in Milperra, New South Wales on 9 February 2020.

- Matthew David Elliott
- Daniel Groom
- Adrian Phu

== Queen Elizabeth II Platinum Jubilee Medal ==
Platinum Jubilee medal ribbon

The award certificates are dated with 6 February 2022. The dates listed below are the dates the medals were physically received by the recipient.

Victoria Cross

- Keith Payne, VC, AM - 29 November 2022

Victoria Cross for Australia

- Mark Donaldson, VC - 2 November 2022
- Ben Roberts-Smith, VC, MG - 29 November 2022
- Daniel Keighran, VC - 29 November 2022

George Cross

- Michael Pratt, GC - 20 November 2022

Cross of Valour

- Allan Sparkes, CV, OAM - 2 November 2022
- Victor Boscoe, CV - 29 November 2022

== Australian Sports Medal ==
Australian Sports Medal ribbon

On 4 December 2020, the Queen of Australia assented to amendments to the regulations for the Australian Sports Medal, which reactivated awards to commemorate Australian sporting participation in major multi-sports events, including:

- Invictus Games (from 2018)
- International Sports Federation for Persons with Intellectual Disability (INAS) Global Games (from 2019)
- Special Olympics World Summer Games (from 2019)
- Special Olympics World Winter Games (from 2021)
- Summer Olympic Games (from 2020)
- Winter Olympic Games (from 2022)
- Summer Paralympic Games (from 2020)
- Winter Paralympic Games (from 2022)
- Commonwealth Games (from 2022)

The backlog of medals are now being awarded with some 4,500 medals expected to be awarded over October-December alone.
