= Commendation for Gallantry =

Australian military decoration

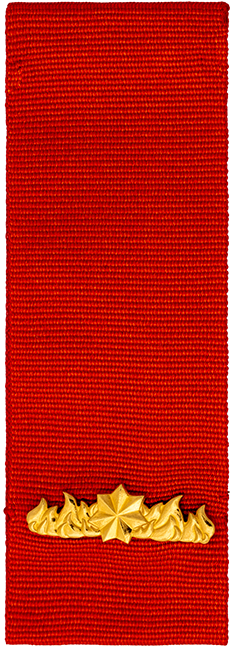
- Type: Medal
- Awarded for: "Acts of great heroism or conspicuous gallantry in action in circumstances of great peril"
- Presented by: Governor-General of Australia
- Eligibility: Members of the Australian Defence Force
- Status: Currently awarded
- Established: 15 January 1991
- First award: 1998
- Final award: 2025 Special Honours

Highlights
- Total: 118
- Ribbon bar of the Medal

Order of Wear
- Next (higher): Royal Victorian Medal
- Next (lower): Commendation for Brave Conduct

The Commendation for Gallantry is a military decoration awarded to personnel of the Australian Defence Force, it recognises acts of gallantry in action considered worthy of recognition. The award was introduced on 15 January 1991, replacing the Imperial equivalent of the Mentioned in Despatches. It is ranked fourth in the Gallantry Decorations in the Australian Honours System.

== Description ==
- The insignia of the Commendation for Gallantry is a Federation Star superimposed centrally on a gold-plated silver row of flames.
- The insignia is attached to a plain orange ribbon. The centre of the Federation Star is 19 mm from the bottom of the ribbon and 16 mm from either edge.

== Recipients ==
| Name | Rank | Date awarded | Citation | Notes |
|---|---|---|---|---|
| Anonymous | | 14 June 2010 | For acts of gallantry in warlike operations in Afghanistan in 2009. | |
| A | Corporal | 14 June 2010 | For acts of gallantry in action in Afghanistan in 2008. | |
| A | Private | 26 January 2011 | For acts of gallantry in action while a machine-gunner under enemy fire in Afghanistan in January 2010. | |
| B | Sergeant | 26 January 2010 | For acts of gallantry in action as the commander of an explosive ordnance detachment in Afghanistan in 2008. | |
| B | Corporal | 10 June 2013 | For acts of gallantry in action as a team commander, Special Operations Task Group on Operation SLIPPER in Afghanistan. | |
| B | Private | 26 January 2015 | For acts of gallantry in action during Operation SLIPPER. | |
| Nathan David Bendle | Private | 26 January 2013 | For acts of gallantry in action on 7 September 2011 while deployed on Operation SLIPPER as a member of Mentoring Task Force 3 in Afghanistan. | |
| Phillip Mowbray Bessell | Private | 5 February 2019 | For acts of gallantry in action following capture by the Imperial Japanese Army in March 1942 until his execution as a result of an escape attempt in about April 1942. | |
| Neil Raymond Bextrum | Private | 2 November 2016 | For acts of gallantry in action as a member of 7 Section, 12 Platoon, D Company of the 6th Battalion, the Royal Australian Regiment, during the Battle of Long Tan, Phuoc Tuy Province, Vietnam on 18 August 1966. | |
| Marley Clifton Bird | Private | 26 January 2011 | For acts of gallantry in action while a rifleman and Acting Section Second-in-Command, 6 Section, Combat Team Bravo, Mentoring and Reconstruction Task Force 2 during Operation SLIPPER in Afghanistan from July 2009 to February 2010. | |
| Stephen Geoffrey Bloomfield | Corporal | 31 May 2019 | For acts of gallantry in action as a Special Air Service Regiment medical assistant left alone for three days in enemy territory to tend to a severely wounded fellow soldier who had been gored by an elephant in Kalimantan during the Indonesian-Malaysian Confrontation in June 1965. | |
| Ronald Howard Brett | Private | 2 November 2016 | For acts of gallantry in action as a member of 2 Platoon, A Company, 6th Battalion, the Royal Australian Regiment, during the Battle of Long Tan, Phuoc Tuy Province, Vietnam on 18 August 1966. | |
| Forrest Jack Bridges | Private | 3 June 1998 | n/a | |
| Justin James Brown | Able Seaman | 25 March 2000 | For gallantry during a reconnaissance of an amphibious landing site in East Timor on the night of 21 October 1999. | |
| Brook Burgess | Trooper | 25 March 2000 | For gallantry in providing medical support to two wounded fellow soldiers while under fire with the International Force East Timor on 6 October 1999. | |
| C | Corporal | 26 January 2012 | For acts of gallantry in action while a team commander. | |
| Ian Martin Campbell | Private | 2 November 2016 | For acts of gallantry in action as a member of 10 Platoon, D Company, 6th Battalion, the Royal Australian Regiment, during the Battle of Long Tan, Phuoc Tuy Province, Vietnam on 18 August 1966. | |
| Harold Bertie Chatfield | Flying Officer | 19 September 2017 | For acts of gallantry in action as a member of Number 615 Squadron, Royal Air Force, during the air war in Burma from December 1943 to June 1944. | |
| Anthony Patrick Clarke | Corporal | 26 January 2014 | For acts of gallantry in action while commanding a high risk search team in the 3rd Battalion, the Royal Australian Regiment Task Group, in Khas Uruzgan, Afghanistan, on 2 September 2012. | |
| D | Private | 14 June 2010 | For acts of gallantry in action in Afghanistan in 2009. | |
| D | Corporal | 26 January 2012 | For acts of gallantry in action while a team commander. | |
| D | Sergeant | 11 June 2012 | For acts of gallantry in action while deployed as a troop sergeant on Operation SLIPPER in Afghanistan. | |
| D | Private | 26 January 2013 | For acts of gallantry in action. | |
| Clifford Edmond Danaher | Sergeant | 12 February 2015 | For acts of gallantry in action while a prisoner of war. | |
| John Edward Durkin | Private | 5 February 2019 | For acts of gallantry in action following capture by the Imperial Japanese Army in early March 1942 until his execution as a result of an escape attempt on 14 August 1945. | |
| James Frederick Elmore | Private | 5 February 2019 | For acts of gallantry in action following capture by the Imperial Japanese Army on 3 February 1942 until his death on 22 May 1945, as a result of an escape attempt in March 1945. | |
| Wilkins Fitzallen | Lieutenant | 5 February 2019 | For acts of gallantry in action while held in captivity, during his escape and subsequent recapture by the Imperial Japanese Army on Dutch Timor during the period 23 February 1942 until his execution on, or before, 23 October 1942. | |
| Arthur Edward Ford | Private | 5 February 2019 | For acts of gallantry in action following capture by the Imperial Japanese Army on 15 February 1942 until his execution as a result of an escape attempt on 17 March 1942. | |
| Noel John Grimes | Private | 2 November 2016 | For acts of gallantry in action as a member of 12 Platoon, D Company, 6th Battalion, the Royal Australian Regiment, during the Battle of Long Tan, Phuoc Tuy Province, Vietnam on 18 August 1966. | |
| William Michael Hall | Lance Corporal | 3 June 1998 | n/a | |
| Adam John Heemskerk | Corporal | 26 January 2012 | For acts of gallantry in action on 20 August 2010 while a section commander with Mentoring Team Alpha, the 1st Mentoring Task Force at Musazai, Mirabad Valley, Afghanistan. | |
| Mitchell Jon Howden | Corporal | 14 June 2021 | For acts of gallantry in action while a Section Commander in the Quick Reaction Force Platoon, Task Group Taji X, Iraq on 11 March 2020. | |
| J | Private | 26 January 2011 | For acts of gallantry in action as a team member during heavy and sustained enemy fire on Operation SLIPPER in Afghanistan in 2009. | |
| J | Private | 26 January 2011 | For acts of gallantry in action while a patrol signaller and joint terminal air controller Afghanistan in 2009. | |
| Jack Victor Jones | Private | 5 February 2019 | For acts of gallantry in action following capture by the Imperial Japanese Army in March 1942 until his execution as a result of an escape attempt in about April 1942. | |
| K | Sergeant | 26 January 2013 | For acts of gallantry in action. | |
| William Albert Kinloch | Warrant Officer | 26 March 2024 | For acts of gallantry in action over two tours of operational service with Number 464 Squadron. | |
| Shaun Miller Kober | Lance Corporal | 26 January 2012 | For acts of gallantry in action during October 2010 and January 2011 while a sniper team second-in-command in Mentoring Team Four Three Bravo, Combat Team Delta, the 2nd Mentoring Task Force in Chora, Baluchi Valley, Afghanistan. | |
| L | Corporal | 13 June 2011 | For acts of gallantry in action while on Operation SLIPPER in Afghanistan. | |
| L | Private | 26 January 2014 | For acts of gallantry in action while on operations with the Special Operations Task Group on Operation SLIPPER. | |
| M | Private | 13 June 2011 | For acts of gallantry in action while on Operation SLIPPER in Afghanistan. | |
| Howard Thomas Manning | Sergeant | 5 February 2019 | For acts of gallantry in action following capture by the Imperial Japanese Army in March 1942 until his execution as a result of an escape attempt in about April 1942. | |
| Norman Heather McArtney | Private | 5 February 2019 | For acts of gallantry in action following capture by the Imperial Japanese Army on 15 February 1942, until his execution as a result of as escape attempt on 12 July 1943. | |
| Alan Mull | Major | 6 July 2022 | For acts of gallantry in action following capture by the Imperial Japanese Army on 15 February 1942 until his execution as a result of an escape attempt on 10 March 1943. | |
| Justin Reginald Mulligan | Pilot Officer | 26 March 2024 | For acts of gallantry in action over two tours of operational service with Number 464 Squadron. | |
| Richard Murray | Private | 13 October 2023 | For an act of gallantry in action while a Far East Prisoner of war at Ranau which resulted in his execution on 20 May 1945. | |
| O | Trooper | 13 October 2023 | For acts of gallantry in action while deployed as a patrol medic on Operation SLIPPER in Afghanistan. | |
| Trent Ollis | Private | 9 June 2008 | For gallantry in action in hazardous circumstances while acting as Lead Scout of 12 Platoon, Security Task Group, 2nd Reconstruction Task Force under enemy fire at Musazai on the 8th August 2007. | |
| Shaun Patrick Parker | Private | 26 January 2012 | For acts of gallantry in action on 24 August 2010 while a machine gunner with Mentoring Team Delta, the 1st Mentoring Task Force at Derapet, Tangi Valley, Afghanistan. | |
| Kevin Richard Paulsen | Warrant Officer Class Two | 3 June 1998 | n/a | |
| Geoffrey Michael Peters | Private | 2 November 2016 | For acts of gallantry in action as a member and later acting section commander of 1 Section, 10 Platoon, D Company, 6th Battalion, the Royal Australian Regiment, during the Battle of Long Tan, Phuoc Tuy Province, Vietnam on 18 August 1966. | |
| R | Sergeant | 11 June 2012 | For acts of gallantry in action while a platoon sergeant on Operation SLIPPER in Afghanistan. | |
| R | Sapper | 10 June 2013 | For acts of gallantry in action as a special operations engineer, Special Operations Task Group on Operation SLIPPER in Afghanistan. | |
| William Alfred Roche | Private | 2 November 2016 | For acts of gallantry in action as a section second in command and section commander in 10 Platoon, D Company, 6th Battalion, the Royal Australian Regiment, during the Battle of Long Tan, Phuoc Tuy Province, Vietnam on 18 August 1966. | |
| Bernard Ronald Ryan | Private | 26 January 2010 | For gallantry in action while an advanced medical technician in the Operational Mentoring and Liaison Team at Kwajeh Ahmed, Afghanistan on 24 March 2009. | |
| S | Private | 26 January 2010 | For acts of gallantry in action. | |
| S | Lance Corporal | 11 June 2012 | For acts of gallantry in action while a team second-in-command on Operation Slipper in Afghanistan. | |
| Gordon Cameron Sharp | Second Lieutenant | 2 November 2016 | For acts of gallantry in action as the platoon commander of 11 Platoon, D Company, 6th Battalion, the Royal Australian Regiment, during the Battle of Long Tan, Phuoc Tuy Province, Vietnam on 18 August 1966. | |
| Scott James Smith | Corporal | 26 January 2013 | For acts of gallantry in action on 21 October 2012 while an Explosive Ordnance Reconnaissance Technician in Special Operations Task Group Rotation XVIII in Afghanistan. | |
| Samuel Solonsch | Private | 14 November 2024 | For acts of gallantry in action following capture by the Imperial Japanese Army on 7 March 1942 until his execution as a result of an escape attempt and activities in support of the Dutch Resistance in Java on 11 April 1943. | |
| Daryl Maxwell Sproule, DFC | Squadron Leader | 5 February 2019 | For acts of gallantry in action following his capture by the Imperial Japanese Navy and until his execution as a result of an escape attempt around the middle of August 1943. | |
| Scott Philip Tampalini | Corporal | 26 January 2010 | For gallantry in action while an Operational Mentoring and Liaison Team member in Afghanistan at Chora 19 December 2008, Kakarak 16 March 2009 and Sorkh Morgarb 18 March 2009. | |
| W | Corporal | 9 June 2014 | For acts of gallantry in action on Operation SLIPPER. | |
| Nathen Fane Webb | Corporal | 26 January 2010 | For gallantry in action while a section commander in 2 Platoon, Combat Team TUSK, Mentoring and Reconstruction Task Force 1, in the Chora Valley, Afghanistan on 29 December 2008. | |
| Sidney Arthur Webber | Private | 5 February 2019 | For acts of gallantry in action following capture by the Imperial Japanese Army on 15 February 1942 until his death as a result of escaping on 18 June 1945. | |
| Bertram John West | Sergeant | 5 February 2019 | For acts of gallantry in action while held in captivity, during his escape and subsequent recapture by the Imperial Japanese Army on Dutch Timor during the period 23 February 1942 until his execution on, or before, 23 October 1942. | |
| Henry Whitton | Sergeant | 5 February 2019 | For acts of gallantry in action following capture by the Imperial Japanese Army in March 1942 until his execution as a result of an escape attempt in about April 1942. | |
| Kyle Anthony Wilson | Private | 26 January 2013 | For acts of gallantry in action on 7 September 2011 while deployed on Operation SLIPPER as a member of Mentoring Task Force 3 in Afghanistan. | |
| Barry Leon Young | Captain | 4 September 1998 | n/a | |

== See also ==
- Australian Honours Order of Precedence
