= 2025 Special Honours (Australia) =

Honours awarded by the sovereign

The Special Honours Lists for Australia are announced by the Sovereign and Governor-General at any time.

Some honours are awarded by other countries where King Charles III is the Head of State, Australians receiving those honours are listed here with the relevant reference.

This list also incorporates the Mid Winters Day honours list and the Bravery honours lists.

== Order of Australia ==
Ribbon bar of the Order of Australia (General)

Ribbon bar of the Order of Australia (Military)

=== Companion of the Order of Australia (AC) ===
Honorary General

- The Honourable Lee Hsien Loong, Senior Minister of Singapore – 6 August 2025 – For eminent service to the bilateral relationship.

=== Officer of the Order of Australia (AO) ===
Honorary General

- Ng Eng Hen, Singapore – 10 December 2025 (authorised 9 February 2026) – For distinguished service to the Australia-Singapore bilateral relationship, particularly to the field of defence cooperation.

=== Member of the Order of Australia (AM) ===
Honorary Military

- General Mohd Asghar Khan Goriman Khan, Kuala Lumpur, Malaysia – 2 May 2025 – For exceptional service in fostering the military relationship between Malaysia and Australia through outstanding personal commitment, strategic vision and leadership.
- Lieutenant General Gaël Diaz de Tuesta, Paris, France – 20 November 2025 (authorised 9 February 2026) – For exceptional service as the International Development Director at the Directorate General of Armaments.
- General Morishita Yasunori (Retd), Japan – 20 November 2025 (authorised 25 April 2026) – For exceptional service as Chief of Staff of the Japan Ground Self-Defense Force, for his strong contribution to regional security, and for enhancing the relationship between the Australian Army and Japan Ground Self-Defense Force.
- Lieutenant General Roy Mabagos Galido, Muntinlupa City, Philippines – 20 November 2025 (authorised 10 May 2026) – For exceptional service as Commanding General of the Philippine Army in advancing the relationship between the Australian Army and the Philippine Army.
- Admiral Muhammad Ali, East Jakarta, Indonesia – 20 November 2025 (authorised 1 July 2026) – For exceptional service in the promotion and enhancement of the relationship between the Republic of Indonesia and Australia.

== Royal Victorian Order ==
Ribbon bar of the Royal Victorian Order

=== Lieutenant of the Royal Victorian Order (LVO) ===
- Bronwyn Kay Jolly. Aide to the Governor of South Australia. Awarded as part of the 2025 Birthday Honours
- David Donald Owen. lately Official Secretary to the Governor of Tasmania. Awarded as part of the 2025 Birthday Honours
- Dominic Charles David Richards, OAM. Chairman, The King's Foundation Australia. Awarded as part of the 2025 Birthday Honours
- Peter George Kaye, AM, ESM – 4 December 2025 – National Chief Executive Officer, The Duke of Edinburgh’s Award – Australia.

=== Member of the Royal Victorian Order (MVO) ===
- Katherine Jane Hastings – lately Official Secretary to the Governor of Queensland. Awarded as part of the 2025 New Year Honours

== Most Excellent Order of the British Empire ==
Ribbon bar of the Order of the British Empire (Civil)

=== Dame Commander of the Order of the British Empire (DBE) ===
- The Right Honourable Patricia Hewitt – chair, NHS Norfolk and Waveney Integrated Care Board. For services to Healthcare Transformation. Awarded as part of the 2025 New Year Honours

=== Officer of the Order of the British Empire (OBE) ===
- Professor Mary Patricia Steen. Professor of Midwifery, Curtin University and King Edward Memorial Hospital, Perth, Australia. For services to Midwifery and Maternal and Familial Health research. Awarded as part of the 2025 Birthday Honours

== Star of Gallantry (SG) ==
Ribbon bar of the Star of Gallantry

Australian Army

- The late Lance Corporal Kerry Michael Rooney – 28 October 2025 – For conspicuous gallantry in action in circumstances of great peril as a Section Commander 5 Platoon, Bravo Company, 6th Battalion, The Royal Australian Regiment during Operation BRIBIE, South Vietnam on 17 February 1967.

== Medal for Gallantry (MG) ==
Ribbon bar of the Medal for Gallantry

Australian Army

- Second Lieutenant John Patrick O’Halloran – 8 August 2025 – For acts of gallantry in action in hazardous circumstances as the Platoon Commander, 5 Platoon, Bravo Company, 6th Battalion, the Royal Australian Regiment during Operation BRIBIE, South Vietnam on 17 February 1967. The Medal for Gallantry replaced the award of the mention in despatches, which was cancelled in the same gazette notice.

== Bravery Medal (BM) ==
Ribbon bar of the Bravery Medal

- Jordan Heath Anderson – Mr Jordan Anderson displayed considerable bravery during the rescue of four people from a submerged vehicle in Swan Hill, Victoria on 8 March 2015.
- Stephen Shane Edwards – Mr Stephen Edwards displayed considerable bravery by his actions during the rescue of a woman on railway tracks in Kingston, Queensland on 31 August 2000.
- The late Senior Constable Kelly Ann Foster, New South Wales Police Force – The late Ms Kelly Ann Foster displayed considerable bravery by her actions during a canyoning accident in Mount Wilson, New South Wales on 2 January 2021.
- Luke Aidan Giudicatti – Mr Luke Giudicatti displayed considerable bravery by his actions during the rescue of a woman in Cairns, Queensland on 23 November 2019.
- Gabrielle Rebecca Kelly – Ms Gabrielle Kelly displayed considerable bravery by her actions during a violent attack in Ipswich, Queensland on 10 November 2018.
- Senior Constable Karyn Hart, Queensland Police Service – Senior Constable Karyn Hart displayed considerable bravery by her actions protecting a woman during a violent attack in Dakabin, Queensland on 27 August 2020.
- Aaliah Paige Johnson – Miss Aaliah Johnson displayed considerable bravery by her actions after an incident in Albanvale, Victoria on 14 March 2022.
- Tyra Johnson – Miss Tyra Johnson displayed considerable bravery by her actions after an incident in Albanvale, Victoria on 14 March 2022.
- The late Lisa Mandeltort – The late Ms Lisa Mandeltort displayed considerable bravery by her actions attempting to rescue a child from a rip at Venus Bay, Victoria on 13 January 2021.
- Chantelle Sims – Miss Chantelle Sims displayed considerable bravery by her actions after an incident in Albanvale, Victoria on 14 March 2022.
- Joshua Smith – Mr Joshua Smith displayed considerable bravery by his actions rescuing two children who were being stabbed in Wingfield, South Australia on 15 August 2022.

== Distinguished Service Medal (DSM) ==
Ribbon bar of the Distinguished Service Medal

- Colonel Ian Francis Ahearn, OAM – 16 May 2025 – For distinguished leadership in warlike operations as the Gun Position Officer with 102nd Field Battery during the Battle of Fire Support Patrol Base Coral from 12 to 16 May 1968.
- Lieutenant Colonel Graeme Kingsley Chapman – 28 October 2025 – For distinguished leadership in warlike operations as the Officer Commanding C Company, 7th Battalion, the Royal Australian Regiment in South Vietnam in February 1968.
- Colonel John Richard James – 28 October 2025 – For distinguished leadership in warlike operations as platoon commander A company (Minus) The 5th Battalion, The Royal Australian Regiment during the Battle of Hat Dich on 21 August 1969.

== Order of St John ==
Order of St John ribbon

=== Knight of the Order of St John ===
- Noel Gillard, OAM – 10 November 2025

=== Dame of the Order of St John ===
- Her Excellency the Honourable Samantha Joy Mostyn, AC – 23 January 2025
- Sally Carbon, OAM – 10 November 2025

=== Commander of the Order of St John ===
- Martin Dutch – 10 November 2025
- Robert Devere – 10 November 2025
- Matthew Glozier – 10 November 2025
- Scott McCarthy – 10 November 2025
- Elizabeth Ellis – 10 November 2025
- Mandy Paradise – 10 November 2025
- Kylie Seidel – 10 November 2025

=== Officer of the Order of St John ===
- Bradley Carle – 10 November 2025
- Michael Cheng – 10 November 2025
- Andrew Craig – 10 November 2025
- Robbie Dinich – 10 November 2025
- Lachlan Liao – 10 November 2025
- Alison Ford – 10 November 2025
- Ruth Jones – 10 November 2025
- Lynne Schreurs – 10 November 2025

=== Member of the Order of St John ===
- Geoff Bates – 10 November 2025
- Geoffery Chen – 10 November 2025
- Alan Churchill – 10 November 2025
- Philip Cohen – 10 November 2025
- Alexander Crass – 10 November 2025
- Aidan D'Agostino – 10 November 2025
- Jason Degenhardt – 10 November 2025
- Dale Eather – 10 November 2025
- Lee Easton – 10 November 2025
- Gregory Edmonds – 10 November 2025
- James Eracelous – 10 November 2025
- James French – 10 November 2025
- Paul Hondrovasilopoulos – 10 November 2025
- Iain Hunt – 10 November 2025
- Ross Hunter – 10 November 2025
- Michael Kosonen – 10 November 2025
- Kemuel Lam Paktsun – 10 November 2025
- Terry Lamey – 10 November 2025
- Jake Lindemann – 10 November 2025
- Robert Llewellyn – 10 November 2025
- Robyn Lloyd – 10 November 2025
- Benjamin Lynch – 10 November 2025
- Thomas Marcus – 10 November 2025
- Harold Marwick – 10 November 2025
- Scott McDonald – 10 November 2025
- Peter Quinn – 10 November 2025
- Brodie Taylor – 10 November 2025
- Fredrik Tronnberg – 10 November 2025
- Simon Turnbull – 10 November 2025
- Philip Winter – 10 November 2025
- Elizabeth Armstrong – 10 November 2025
- Kathryn Berry – 10 November 2025
- Tanetta Cameron – 10 November 2025
- Elizabeth Cannizzaro – 10 November 2025
- Maddison Carrier – 10 November 2025
- Emma Compton – 10 November 2025
- Caitlin Fabish-Wood – 10 November 2025
- Penny Farries – 10 November 2025
- Lilian Gara – 10 November 2025
- Meghan Grove – 10 November 2025
- Helen Harris – 10 November 2025
- Sabine Hickling – 10 November 2025
- Christine Hunter – 10 November 2025
- Clarissa Luo – 10 November 2025
- Lou Perez – 10 November 2025
- Aileen Prout – 10 November 2025
- Thelma Tiley – 10 November 2025
- Sally-Ann Williams – 10 November 2025
- Tamara Willcox – 10 November 2025
- Danielle Wisewould – 10 November 2025
- Linda Xu – 10 November 2025

== Australian Antarctic Medal ==
Ribbon bar of the Australian Antarctic Medal

- Dr Christopher Johnson Carson – 21 June 2025 – For outstanding contributions to Australia’s Antarctic Program, particularly through geoscientific research and fostering international scientific collaboration.
- Dr Jan Marie Wallace – 21 June 2025 – For outstanding contribution to Australia’s Antarctic Program, particularly through remote medicine practices.

== Royal Victorian Medal (RVM) ==
Royal Victorian Medal ribbon

Silver

- Stephen William Canning. Lately Senior Patrol Officer, Government House, Queensland. Awarded as part of the 2025 Birthday Honours
- Evahn Joel Derkley. IT Manager, Government House, Canberra. Awarded as part of the 2025 Birthday Honours
- Lisa Ann Mills. Under-Butler, Government House, Adelaide. Awarded as part of the 2025 Birthday Honours

== Commendation for Gallantry ==
Ribbon bar of the Commendation for Gallantry

Australian Army

- The late Private Angelo Basil Natoli – 10 January 2025 – For acts of gallantry in action on 8 December 1943 while operating on the Huon Peninsula, New Guinea as part of 8 Section, 15 Platoon of the 29th/46th Australian Infantry Battalion.
- Colonel Geoffrey Charles Skardon – 10 January 2025 – For acts of gallantry in action in August 1964.

== Commendation for Brave Conduct ==
Ribbon bar of the Commendation for Brave Conduct

- Liam Connor Brian – Mr Liam Connor Brian is commended for brave conduct for his actions during the rescue of two men from water in Catherine Hill Bay, New South Wales on 20 December 2018.
- Jason Andrew Gibbs – Mr Jason Gibbs is commended for brave conduct for his actions following a shark attack in Greenmount, Queensland on 8 September 2020.
- Luke Alex Gorecki – Mr Luke Gorecki is commended for brave conduct for his actions during the rescue of occupants from a burning garage in Sanctuary Point, NSW on 16 September 2022.
- Clifford George Hagart – Mr Clifford Hagart is commended for brave conduct for his actions during a stabbing incident in South Hedland, Western Australia on 1 May 2020.
- Cameron Jack O'Neill – Mr Cameron O'Neill is commended for brave conduct for his actions during a stabbing in Coomera, Queensland on 28 May 2022.
- Detective Senior Constable Travis Mark Petersen, Western Australia Police Force – Detective Senior Constable Travis Petersen is commended for brave conduct for his actions during the rescue of a person from an offender with an axe in Bicton, Western Australia on 4 December 2007.
- Peter Zmuda, Northcote – Mr Peter Zmuda is commended for brave conduct for his actions during the rescue of a woman from a burning house in Northcote, Victoria on 16 September 2021.
- Brevet Sergeant Gregory Blieden, South Australia Police – Brevet Sergeant Gregory Blieden is commended for brave conduct for his actions during the rescue of a child from a burning building in Paralowie, South Australia on 18 May 2019.
- Detective Sergeant Bradley Galpin, South Australia Police – Detective Sergeant Bradley Galpin is commended for brave conduct for his actions during the rescue of a child from a burning building in Paralowie, South Australia on 18 May 2019.
- Connor Herwig – Mr Connor Herwig is commended for brave conduct for his actions during a stabbing incident in South Hedland, Western Australia on 1 May 2020.
- John Kenny – Mr John Kenny is commended for brave conduct for his actions standing up to an aggressive male threatening students on a bus in North Sydney, New South Wales on 20 November 2019.
- Martin Lloyd – Mr Martin Lloyd is commended for brave conduct for his actions rescuing a woman from floodwater in MP Creek, Queensland on 6 March 2022.
- David Francis Lopez – Mr David Lopez is commended for brave conduct for his actions intercepting a person from oncoming vehicles on a motorway near Jamisontown, New South Wales on 23 March 2020.
- Kirrilly Petah Lopez – Mrs Kirrilly Lopez is commended for brave conduct for her actions intercepting a person from oncoming vehicles on a motorway near Jamisontown, New South Wales on 23 March 2020.
- Rydell Murray – Mr Rydell Murray is commended for brave conduct for his actions during a house fire in Acacia Ridge, Queensland on 4 June 2020.
- Michael Napper – Mr Michael Napper is commended for brave conduct for his actions during the retrieval of a father and daughter from rough seas at Grange Beach, South Australia on 20 January 2022.
- Stephen Parker – Mr Stephen Parker is commended for brave conduct for his actions in rescuing a man from a burning electric vehicle in Barramunga, Victoria on 13 June 2022.
- William Reissenweber – Mr William Reissenweber is commended for brave conduct for his actions entering a burning car to attempt to free a trapped driver in Gawler Belt, South Australia on 15 August 2019.
- Dean Rossit – Mr Dean Rossit is commended for brave conduct for his actions rescuing two swimmers in Austinmer, New South Wales on 11 April 2023.
- Michael Schmidt – Mr Michael Schmidt is commended for brave conduct for his actions during a house fire in Acacia Ridge, Queensland on 4 June 2020.
- Gethyn Singleton – Mr Gethyn Singleton is commended for brave conduct for his actions rescuing a man from dangerous waters at Waitpinga Beach, South Australia on 15 January 2019.

== Commendation for Distinguished Service ==
Ribbon bar of the Commendation for Distinguished Service

- Dennis Wayne Townsend – 28 October 2025 – For distinguished performance of duty as the Number Two Machine Gunner with 9 Section, 6 Platoon, B Company, 2nd Battalion, Royal Australian Regiment during a platoon ambush in South Vietnam on 15 December 1970.

== King Charles III Coronation Medal ==
Ribbon bar of the King Charles III Coronation Medal

- Richard Joyes, CV – 15 February 2025
- The Right Honourable Simon Abney-Hastings, 15th Earl of Loudoun – 25 November 2025 – For services as a bearer of the Golden Spurs during the Coronation of Charles III and Camilla

== Group Bravery Citation ==
Group Bravery Citation

The recipients are recognised with the award of the Group Bravery Citation for their actions in intervening and apprehending a man armed with a knife in Sydney, NSW on 13 August 2019.

- Mr Mitchell John Bennetts
- Mr Bennett Lea Gardiner
- Mr Gonzalo Alejandro Herrera
- Mr Jamie Ingram
- Mr Jase Shore

The recipients are recognised with the award of the Group Bravery citation for their actions during a prison riot at Long Bay Gaol in New South Wales.

- Mr Robert Gordon Menzies

The recipients are recognised with the award of the Group Bravery Citation for their actions in intervening and apprehending a man armed with a knife in Sydney, NSW on 13 August 2019.

- Mr Luke O’Shaughnessy
- Mr Paul O’Shaughnessy

The recipients are recognised with the award of the Group Bravery Citation for their actions rescuing a woman from a burning house in Bayview Heights, Queensland on 20 September 2022.

- Mr Wayne Maconachie
- Mr Robert Petersen
- Mr Mark Porton
- Mr Barry Uhr
- Mr Teokatai Umaki

The recipients are recognised with the award of the Group Bravery Citation for their actions restraining an armed offender at a hospital in Toowong, Queensland on 28 August 2016.

- Mr Martin Patrick Collins
- Dr Trevor Hollingsworth
- Ms Anne Josephine Jones
- Ms Kim Leanne Shepherd

The recipients are recognised with the award of the Group Bravery Citation for their actions retrieving people from dangerous surf at Newcastle Beach, New South Wales on 20 May 2023.

- Mr Anthony Gerard Kelly
- Mr Christopher Kelly

The recipients are recognised with the award of the Group Bravery Citation for their actions retrieving victims of a plane crash in Mudgee, New South Wales on 14 September 2014.

- Mr Donald Anthony Coombes
- Mr David Robert Ribaux
- Mr Ashley William Walker
