= Victoria Cross for Australia =

Australian medal for gallantry

- Obverse of the medal and ribbon. Ribbon: 32 mm, crimson
- Type: Military decoration
- Awarded for: "[T]he most conspicuous bravery, or some daring or pre-eminent act of valour or self-sacrifice, or extreme devotion to duty in the presence of the enemy."
- Description: Bronze cross pattée with crown and lion superimposed, and motto: 'For Valour'
- Presented by: Governor-General of Australia
- Eligibility: Australian military personnel and other persons approved by the minister of Defence
- Post-nominals: VC
- Status: Currently awarded
- Established: 15 January 1991
- First award: 16 January 2009
- Founder: Elizabeth II on the advice of Bob Hawke, Prime Minister

Highlights
- Total: 6
- Total awarded posthumously: 3

Order of Wear
- Next (higher): none
- Equivalent: Victoria Cross
- Next (lower): George Cross, Cross of Valour

The Victoria Cross for Australia is the highest award in the Australian honours system, superseding the British Victoria Cross for issue to Australians. The Victoria Cross for Australia is the "decoration for according recognition to persons who in the presence of the enemy, perform acts of the most conspicuous gallantry, or daring or pre-eminent acts of valour or self-sacrifice or display extreme devotion to duty".

The Victoria Cross for Australia was created by letters patent signed by Elizabeth II, Queen of Australia, on 15 January 1991 on the advice of Prime Minister Bob Hawke. It is listed equal first with the British Victoria Cross on the Australian Order of Wear with precedence in Australia over all orders, decorations and medals. The decoration may be awarded to members of the Australian Defence Force and to other persons determined by the Australian Minister for Defence. A person to whom the Victoria Cross for Australia has been awarded is entitled to the post nominals VC placed after the person's name.

The Governor-General of Australia awards the Victoria Cross for Australia, with the approval of the Sovereign, on the recommendation of the Minister for Defence, subject to review by the Defence Honours and Awards Appeal Tribunal. As at October 2024, six Victoria Cross for Australia had been awarded, three posthumously. The first was awarded on 16 January 2009 to Trooper Mark Donaldson, who had rescued an International Security Assistance Force interpreter under heavy fire in Uruzgan Province in Afghanistan. Donaldson's award came almost 40 years after Warrant Officer Keith Payne became the last Australian to be awarded the (original) Victoria Cross for gallantry on 24 May 1969 during the Vietnam War. Unlike the original Victoria Cross where the announcement of the award may be followed some time later by the presentation of the award, the announcement of all awards of the Australian VC have occurred on the same occasion as the presentation by the Governor-General in the presence of the Prime Minister. Both VC for Australia and original Victoria Cross recipients are entitled to the Victoria Cross allowance under the Veterans' Entitlements Act 1986.

== History ==
=== Original Victoria Cross ===
The original Victoria Cross was instituted on 29 January 1856 by Queen Victoria by royal warrant and backdated to 1854 to recognise acts of valour committed during the Crimean War. It was originally intended that the Victoria Crosses would be cast from the bronze cascabels of two cannons that were captured from the Russians at the siege of Sevastopol. However, historian John Glanfield has proven, through the use of X-rays of older Victoria Crosses, that the metal used for the Victoria Crosses is in fact made from antique Chinese guns, and not of Russian origin.

The barrels of the cannon used to cast the medals are stationed outside the Officers' Mess, at the Royal Artillery Barracks at Woolwich. The remaining portion of the only remaining cascabel, weighing 10 kilograms (358 oz), is stored in a vault maintained by 15 Regiment, Royal Logistic Corps at MoD Donnington, and can be removed only under armed guard. It is estimated that 80 to 85 more Victoria Crosses could be cast from this source. A single company of jewellers, Hancocks of London, established in 1849, has been responsible for the production of every medal since its inception. Both the Australian and New Zealand Victoria Crosses are made from the same gunmetal as the originals.

The original medal was awarded to 96 Australians; 91 of these were received while serving as members of Australian forces; five were received by former members of the Australian forces who were serving with South African or British forces. Sixty-four awards were for action in the First World War, nine of them for action during the Gallipoli Campaign. Twenty medals were awarded for action in the Second World War, and the other medals were for action in the Second Boer War, Russian Civil War and in the Vietnam War. The last recipient was Warrant Officer Keith Payne, for gallantry on 24 May 1969 during the Vietnam War. Payne was awarded the medal for instigating a rescue of more than 40 men.

=== Separate Commonwealth awards ===
Since the end of the Second World War most but not all Commonwealth countries have introduced their own honours systems, separate from the British honours system. Commonwealth countries, when replacing the British Victoria Cross, George Cross and lesser decorations, created their own decorations for gallantry and bravery. The highest awards for Australia, Canada and New Zealand were named in honour of the British Victoria Cross but are unique awards of each country's honours system. Commonwealth countries have their own Order of Wear which is published in each country's gazette or other publication.

With the issuing of letters patent by the Queen of Australia on 15 January 1991, Australia became the first Commonwealth realm to institute a separate Victoria Cross award in its own honours system. Although it is a separate award, the Victoria Cross for Australia's appearance is identical to its British counterpart. Canada followed suit when in 1993, Queen Elizabeth II as Queen of Canada signed letters patent creating the Canadian Victoria Cross. The Canadian version has a different inscription, as well as being cast from three groupings of metals. The legend has been changed from FOR VALOUR to the Latin PRO VALORE. Although one Canadian VC has been cast, none have been awarded. In 1999, New Zealand created the Victoria Cross for New Zealand, identical to the Australian and British Victoria Crosses, and this has been awarded once, on 2 July 2007 to Corporal Willie Apiata.

== Appearance ==
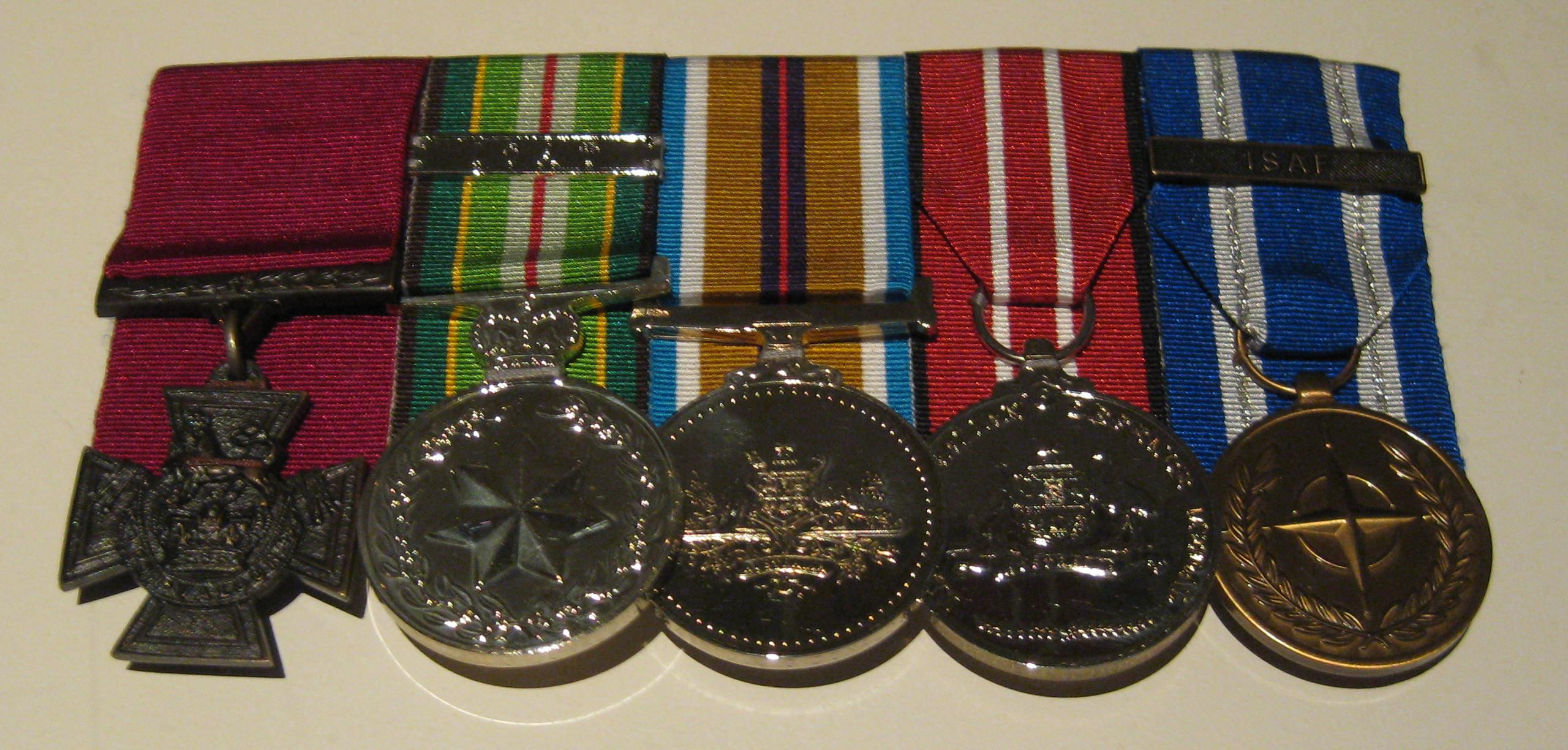
Trooper Donaldson's medals on display at the Australian War Memorial. His Victoria Cross for Australia is at left.

The Victoria Cross for Australia is identical to the original design. It is a "cross pattée 41 millimetres high, 36 millimetres wide. The arms of the Cross have raised edges. The obverse bears a Crowned Lion standing on the Royal Crown with the words 'FOR VALOUR' inscribed on a semi-circular scroll below the Crown. The reverse bears raised edges on the arms of the cross and the date of the act for which the Cross is awarded is engraved within the circle in the centre. The inscription was originally to have been FOR BRAVERY, until it was changed on the recommendation of Queen Victoria, who thought some might erroneously consider that only the recipients of the Victoria Cross were brave in battle. The decoration, suspension bar, and link weigh about 27 grams (0.87 troy ounces).

The cross is suspended by a ring from a seriffed "V" to a bar ornamented with laurel leaves, through which the ribbon passes. The reverse of the suspension bar is engraved with the recipient's name, rank, number and unit. On the reverse of the medal is a circular panel, on which the date of the act for which it was awarded is engraved in the centre. The ribbon is crimson, and is 38 millimetres (1.5 inches) wide. Although the warrants state the colour as red, it is defined by most commentators as "crimson" or "wine-red".

== Conferment ==
The Victoria Cross for Australia is awarded for

... most conspicuous gallantry, or some daring or pre-eminent act of valour or self-sacrifice, or extreme devotion to duty in the presence of the enemy or belligerents.

Awards are granted by the Governor-General with the approval of the Sovereign. The warrant for the Victoria Cross for Australia differs markedly from the Imperial warrant. The new warrant does not specify any particular process for recommendations, though it is expected that any recommendation will pass through the military hierarchy to the Minister for Defence. The new warrant also allows for "other persons determined by the Minister [for Defence] for the purposes of this regulation." Author Robert Macklin has speculated that this has opened up the field of eligibility to policemen and women or civilians during a terrorist act. He goes on to say that by "separating the VC from its traditional roots the Hawke government can be accused, with some justice, of devaluing the honour ..." Subsequent awards of the Victoria Cross for Australia to the same individual shall be made in the form of a bar to the Cross. Where a person has been awarded a second or three or more awards, the post nominals "VC and Bar" or "VC and Bars" may be used.

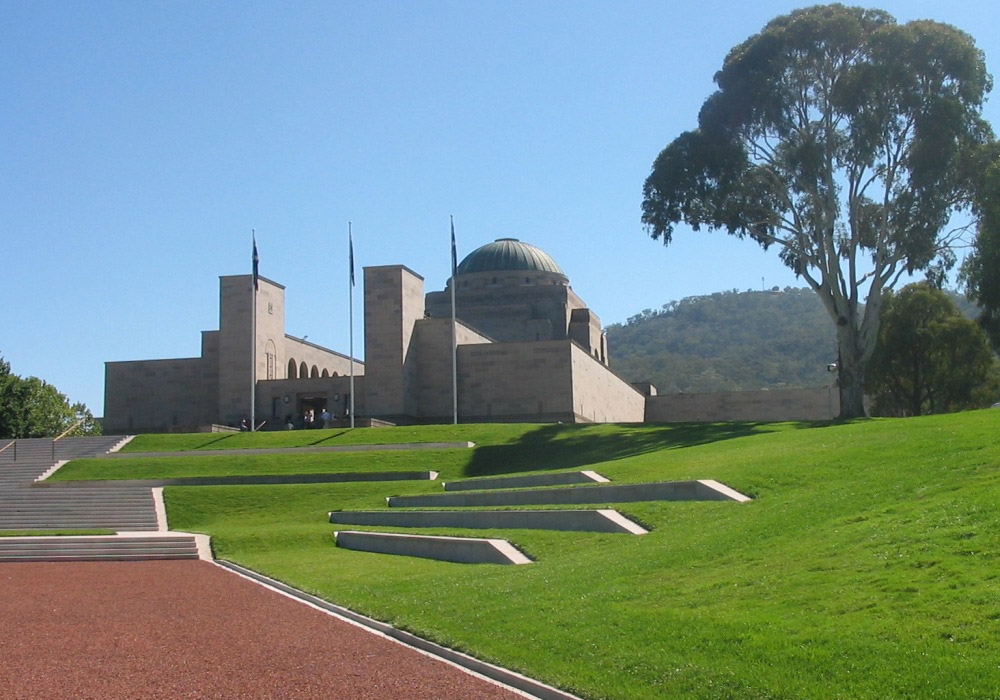
The Australian War Memorial which holds 66 Victoria Crosses

The Victoria Cross for Australia is the highest award in the Australian Honours Order of Precedence. As such, it takes precedence over all other Australian orders and decorations, except the Imperial Victoria Cross, with which it shares equal precedence. This postnominal is valid only for the recipient and is not transferred to the recipient's heirs. "Tradition holds that even the most senior officer will salute a Victoria Cross recipient as a mark of the utmost respect for their act of valour." While it has been a tradition for many years to salute a Victoria Cross recipient the Australian Army Ceremonial Manual, Volume 1, Annex B to Chapter 13 states "Victoria Cross winners, unless they are serving commissioned officers in the armed forces, are not saluted". Air Chief Marshal Angus Houston saluted Trooper Mark Donaldson after he received his VC. Under Section 103, Subsection (4), of the Veterans' Entitlements Act 1986, the Australian Government pays a Victoria Cross Allowance to any service person awarded the medal. The act set this amount at A$3,230 per year. Since 20 September 2005, this amount has been indexed annually in line with Australian Consumer Price Index increases. This amount is in addition to any amount that the veteran may be awarded under the general decoration allowance of $2.10 per fortnight.

The various forms of the Victoria Cross are inherently valuable, as was highlighted on 24 July 2006, when at the auctionhouse Bonhams in Sydney, the VC which had been awarded to First World War soldier Captain Alfred Shout, fetched a world-record hammer price of $1 million. Shout had been awarded the Victoria Cross posthumously in 1915 for hand-to-hand combat at the Lone Pine trenches in Gallipoli, Turkey. The buyer, Kerry Stokes, has lent it to the Australian War Memorial for display with the eight other Victoria Crosses awarded to Australians at Gallipoli. The Australian War Memorial in Canberra currently holds 66 Victoria Crosses, 63 awarded to Australians—including Mark Donaldson's Victoria Cross for Australia on loan—and three to British soldiers; this formed the largest publicly displayed collection in the world, until the opening of the Lord Ashcroft Gallery at the Imperial War Museum (IWM) in London during November 2010, which displays the 168 VCs owned by Michael Ashcroft and 48 more held by the IWM. Purchasers of the Victoria Cross for Australia are not permitted to transport the medals outside of Australia.

== Cancellation ==
The Victoria Cross may be revoked by the governor-general. No Australians have had their Victoria Cross revoked, either the Australian or British versions. The British Victoria Cross also contains a procedure for revocation; however only 8 awards have been revoked between 1861 and 1908. Since the 1920s, awards have generally only been cancelled where it was falsely gained or where the actions recognised involved a criminal offence. King George V stated that a Victoria Cross recipient should be entitled to wear his award, even if sentenced to be hanged for murder. What other circumstances would be required for an award to be cancelled has been debated, especially in the context of the civil findings of war crimes by Ben Roberts-Smith. Australia Defence Association executive director Neil James has suggested that a criminal conviction for war crimes would be sufficient, whilst international legal expert Ben Saul has suggested a lower finding would be all that is needed to meet the "pub test".

== Recipients ==
=== Mark Donaldson ===
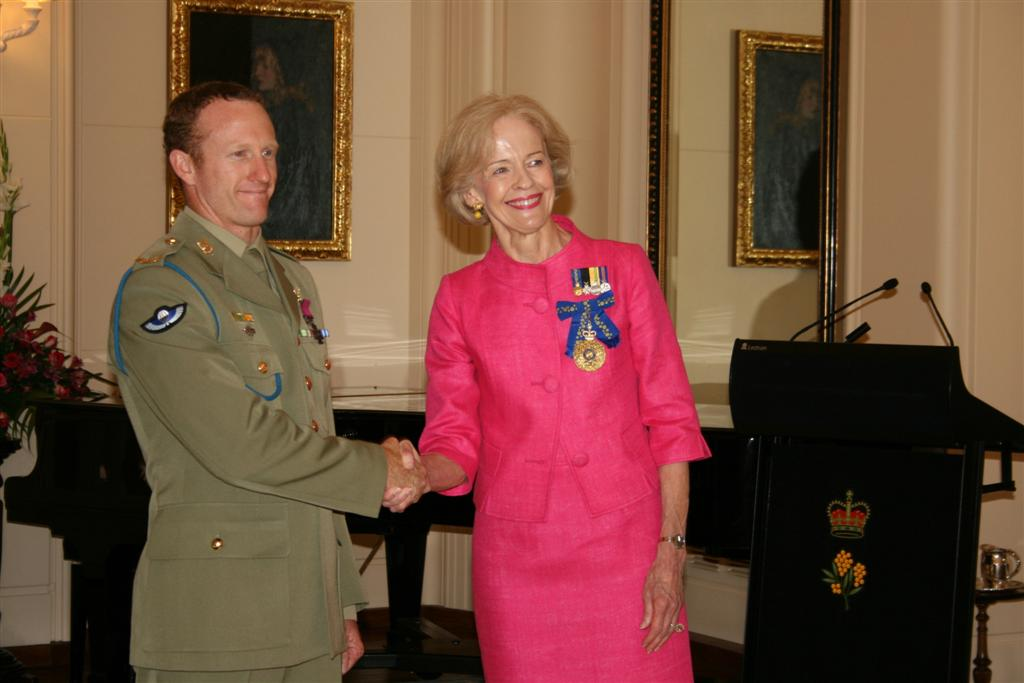
Trooper Mark Donaldson shortly after receiving the Victoria Cross for Australia from Governor-General Quentin Bryce

The first Victoria Cross for Australia was awarded to Trooper Mark Donaldson of the Special Air Service Regiment by Governor-General Quentin Bryce at Government House, Canberra, on 16 January 2009. On 2 September 2008, Donaldson rescued an interpreter under heavy enemy fire in Oruzgan province during Operation Slipper, the Australian contribution to the War in Afghanistan.

For most conspicuous acts of gallantry in action in a circumstance of great peril in Afghanistan as part of the Special Operations Task Group during Operation SLIPPER, Oruzgan Province, Afghanistan.

Corporal Mark Gregor Strang Donaldson enlisted into the Australian Army on 18 June 2002. After completing Recruit and Initial and Employment Training he was posted to the 1st Battalion, The Royal Australian Regiment. Having successfully completed the Special Air Service Selection Course in April 2004, Corporal Donaldson was posted to Special Air Service Regiment in May 2004.

On 2 September 2008, during the conduct of a fighting patrol, Corporal (then Trooper) Donaldson was travelling in a combined Afghan, US and Australian vehicle convoy that was engaged by a numerically superior, entrenched and coordinated enemy ambush. The ambush was initiated by a high volume of sustained machine gun fire coupled with the effective use of rocket propelled grenades. Such was the effect of the initiation that the combined patrol suffered numerous casualties, completely lost the initiative and became immediately suppressed. It was over two hours before the convoy was able to establish a clean break and move to an area free of enemy fire.

In the early stages of the ambush, Corporal Donaldson reacted spontaneously to regain the initiative. He moved rapidly between alternate positions of cover engaging the enemy with 66mm and 84mm anti-armour weapons as well as his M4 rifle. During an early stage of the enemy ambush, he deliberately exposed himself to enemy fire in order to draw attention to himself and thus away from wounded soldiers. This selfless act alone bought enough time for those wounded to be moved to relative safety.

As the enemy had employed the tactic of a rolling ambush, the patrol was forced to conduct numerous vehicle manoeuvres, under intense enemy fire, over a distance of approximately four kilometres to extract the convoy from the engagement area. Compounding the extraction was the fact that casualties had consumed all available space within the vehicles. Those who had not been wounded, including Corporal Donaldson, were left with no option but to run beside the vehicles throughout. During the conduct of this vehicle manoeuvre to extract the convoy from the engagement area, a severely wounded coalition force interpreter was inadvertently left behind. Of his own volition and displaying complete disregard for his own safety, Corporal Donaldson moved alone, on foot, across approximately 80 metres of exposed ground to recover the wounded interpreter. His movement, once identified by the enemy, drew intense and accurate machine gun fire from entrenched positions. Upon reaching the wounded coalition force interpreter, Corporal Donaldson picked him up and carried him back to the relative safety of the vehicles then provided immediate first aid before returning to the fight.

On subsequent occasions during the battle, Corporal Donaldson administered medical care to other wounded soldiers, whilst continually engaging the enemy.

Corporal Donaldson’s acts of exceptional gallantry in the face of accurate and sustained enemy fire ultimately saved the life of a coalition force interpreter and ensured the safety of the other members of the combined Afghan, US and Australian force. Corporal Donaldson’s actions on this day displayed exceptional courage in circumstances of great peril. His actions are of the highest accord and are in keeping with the finest traditions of the Special Operations Command, the Australian Army and the Australian Defence Force.

=== Ben Roberts-Smith ===
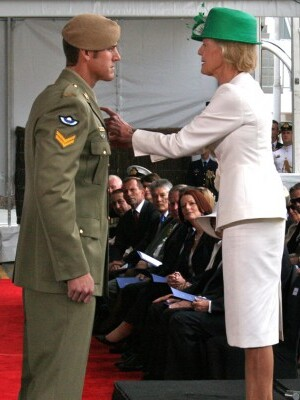
Governor-General Quentin Bryce presenting Corporal Ben Roberts-Smith with the Victoria Cross for Australia

Corporal Ben Roberts-Smith MG of the Special Air Service Regiment was awarded the second Victoria Cross for Australia on 23 January 2011. Corporal Roberts-Smith was awarded the medal for single-handedly charging and destroying two Taliban machine gun positions during the Shah Wali Kot Offensive in Afghanistan on 11 June 2010. This act has been described as similar to that of Edward Kenna VC. Corporal Roberts-Smith had previously been awarded a Medal for Gallantry in 2006, and upon receiving the VC became the most highly decorated serving member of the Australian Defence Force.

In 2020, it was reported that Roberts-Smith had offered his Victoria Cross as collateral for a loan from Australian businessman Kerry Stokes to help fund Roberts-Smith's then-ongoing defamation case. In that case in 2023, Roberts-Smith was found to have committed war crimes in Afghanistan in a court judgment (upheld on appeal), according to the civil standard of proof.

On 7 April, 2026, Ben Roberts-Smith was arrested by the Australian Federal Police, and charged with five counts of war crime murder, in relation to his service in Afghanistan. He was granted bail 10 days later on 17 April. The Australian War Memorial updated his display in the Hall of Honour to include his arrest and the charges. However, his uniform and Victoria Cross remain in the display.

=== Daniel Keighran ===
Corporal Daniel Keighran of the 6th Battalion, Royal Australian Regiment was awarded the Victoria Cross for Australia on 1 November 2012 for actions in the Battle of Derapet (Oruzgan province, Afghanistan) in August 2010. Corporal Keighran deliberately exposed himself to enemy fire, drawing the fire away from an injured colleague and those who were attending to him. He is the third recipient, and the first non-Special Forces recipient, of the award.

=== Cameron Baird ===
On 13 February 2014, Prime Minister Tony Abbott announced that Corporal Cameron Baird of the 2nd Commando Regiment would be awarded a posthumous Victoria Cross for actions in Afghanistan in June 2013. Corporal Baird had previously been awarded the Medal for Gallantry in 2007.

=== Edward "Teddy" Sheean ===
On 12 August 2020, the Queen gave royal assent for Edward "Teddy" Sheean to be posthumously awarded the Victoria Cross for Australia for actions onboard HMAS Armidale (J240) during World War II. Sheean's case had been reviewed three times. The first two reviews came up with conflicting advice. In June 2020, Prime Minister of Australia Scott Morrison ordered an expert panel to review the decision. On 10 August 2020, Morrison accepted the findings of the panel and recommended the Queen posthumously award Sheean the Victoria Cross for Australia.

=== Richard Norden ===
On 1 October 2024, Richard Norden was posthumously awarded the Victoria Cross for Australia for his actions on 14 May 1968 in the Battle of Coral–Balmoral during the Vietnam War.

== Proposed late awards ==
On 3 April 2001, Senator Chris Schacht, then a member of the Australian Senate, gave notice that on the next day of sitting he would introduce the Award of Victoria Cross for Australia Bill 2001 to award the Victoria Cross for Australia to certain persons. The next sitting day, 4 April 2001, Senator Schacht introduced the bill for three members of the Australian forces to be awarded the Victoria Cross for Australia. The bill was read a first time and Senator Schacht gave his Second Reading Speech in which he said it could be argued that an Act conferring a Victoria Cross for Australia may be beyond the legislative power of the Parliament but he believed that the "naval and military defence of the Commonwealth" power under section 51(vi) of the Constitution gave the Parliament authority to legislate with respect to military honours and awards. In accordance with normal procedure, the debate was then adjourned. On 1 June 2001, Sid Sidebottom, the Member for Braddon introduced the Defence Act Amendment (Victoria Cross) Bill 2001. The Bill was similar to the Senate bill and Sidebottom too believed that the Parliament had power under section 51(vi) of the Constitution. Neither bill was debated again before the 2001 Australian federal election, whereupon the bills lapsed. Both Senator Schacht and Mr Sidebottom were members of the Australian Labor Party, then in opposition and the issue was included by the opposition leader Kim Beazley in his election campaign. The awards were intended "to raise the profile and recognition of three ordinary Australians, who displayed outstanding bravery".

The awards were to be made posthumously to John Simpson Kirkpatrick ("Simpson"), Albert Cleary and Teddy Sheean for their actions in the First and Second World Wars.

Simpson's story has become an Australian legend. He was a stretcher bearer with the 3rd Australian Field Ambulance, Australian Army Medical Corps at Gallipoli during the First World War. He landed at Anzac Cove on 25 April 1915 and, on that first night, took a donkey and began carrying wounded from the battle line to the beach for evacuation. He continued this work for three and a half weeks, often under fire, until he was killed. However, in 1919, King George V decreed that no more operational awards would be made for the recently concluded war. In 1965, a campaign to award the Victoria Cross to Simpson resulted in his image with a donkey appearing on the obverse of the Anzac Commemorative Medallion that was announced in 1966 and first issued in 1967.

Following the 2007 Australian federal election the Labor party came to power and there was speculation that the 2001 bills might be reintroduced. Historians such as Anthony Staunton, writing in the Australian Journal of Military History, have opined that the Victoria Cross for Australia should not be awarded retrospectively. It was announced on 13 April 2011 that 13 cases of valour would be examined posthumously by the Australian government's Defence Honours and Awards Appeals Tribunal. The Tribunal first debated "the eligibility of the 13 to receive the Victoria Cross, the Victoria Cross for Australia or other forms of recognition", before moving on to discuss the individual cases. The recommendations of the inquiry were ultimately submitted to government on 6 February 2013, advocating that no awards be made.

On the recommendation of prime minister Scott Morrison, award of the Victoria Cross for Australia to Teddy Sheean received royal assent on 12 August 2020.
