= Jeffrey Rosenfeld =

Australian neurosurgeon (born 1952)

Jeffrey Rosenfeld AC OBE
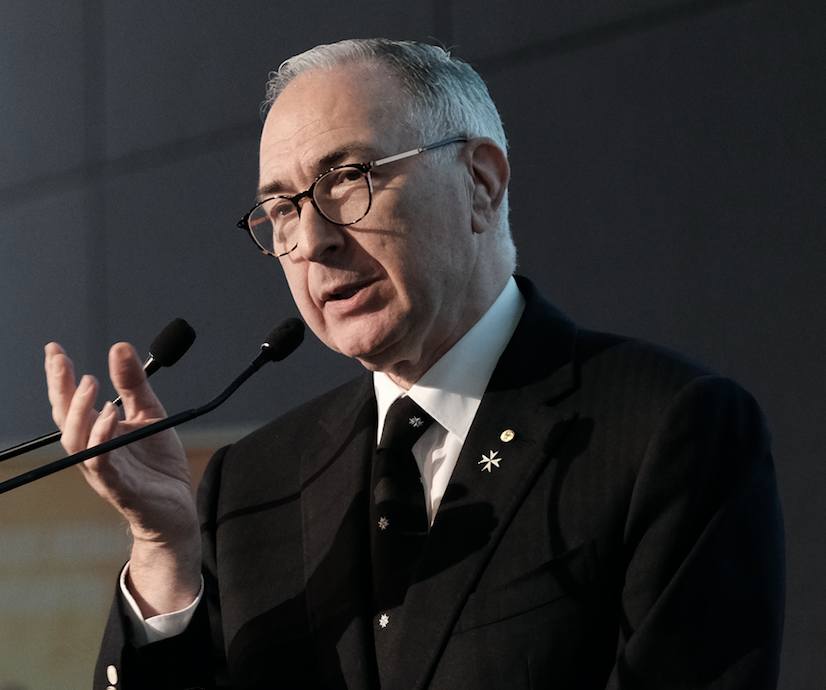
- Rosenfeld speaks at a St John Ambulance Australia Conference in 2019
- Born: 19 November 1952 (age 73)
- Medical career
- Profession: Emeritus Professor of Surgery
- Field: Neurosurgery
- Institutions: Monash University; The Alfred Hospital
- Sub-specialties: Neurotrauma, Brain Computer Interface
- Website: research.monash.edu/en/persons/jeffrey-rosenfeld

Jeffrey Victor Rosenfeld AC OBE (born 19 November 1952) is an Australian neurosurgeon and professor of surgery. He is a senior neurosurgeon in the Department of Neurosurgery at The Alfred Hospital, and the Emeritus Professor of Surgery at Monash University, as well as being a retired major general in the Australian Defence Force, where he served as a medical officer and a military surgeon since 1984. His research has focussed on traumatic brain injury, bionic vision, and medical engineering. He is best known for devising an operation to remove hypothalamic Hamartoma from children's brains.

He has published over 351 peer reviewed articles and 62 book chapters. He has 36117 citations, h-index of 87 and i10-index of 287 (Google Scholar 17 June 2026).

== Early life and education ==
Rosenfeld grew up in the Melbourne suburb of Malvern, where he dreamed of being a doctor from the age of five, and he tended to the family cat wearing a borrowed lab coat. He attended Melbourne High School then studied medicine at the University of Melbourne, graduating in 1976 with an MB BS. This was followed by surgical training at the Royal Melbourne Hospital.

He went on to neurosurgical training, completing post-fellowship training at the Radcliffe Infirmary, Oxford, UK and was Chief Resident in Neurological Surgery at the Cleveland Clinic Foundation, Ohio, USA.

He completed a Research Fellowship at the Walter and Eliza Hall of Medical Research and obtained a Master of Surgery degree from the University of Melbourne in 1992, with his thesis "Neural transplantation in mice: immunological and neurobiological considerations”.

== Medical career ==
Rosenfeld's first involvement with developing countries was when he travelled to Port Moresby, Papua New Guinea, as a trainee surgeon. He continued to make regular visits to PNG and disadvantaged countries. He has since operated on people from the US, UK, Africa, Papua New Guinea, and East Timor.

=== Military ===
Rosenfeld joined the Army Reserve in 1984.

He was sent to war-ravaged Rwanda in 1995 as part of the UN peace-keeping mission (UNAMIR II), where he was a general surgeon with the rank of lieutenant-colonel. "We had stabbings, we had gunshot wounds," he said. "We had children who'd been macheted in the head in order to murder them and had miraculously survived those injuries. In Rwanda, he also had to deal with landmine injuries and this drove him to champion the cause to ban them, working with the International Landmines Council.

By 2011 he was a brigadier. He served on eight deployments, including to Rwanda, East Timor, Bougainville, Solomon Islands and Iraq, and by 2018 he had risen to the rank of major general in the Australian Defence Force and became the Surgeon General ADF (Reserves).

Following his military medical training, Rosenfeld graduated from the Australian Reserve Command and Staff College. From 2006 to 2014, he served as Adjunct Professor at the Centre for Military and Veterans' Health, University of Queensland, contributing to research and education in military and veterans' healthcare.

Rosenfeld chaired the Australian Defence Force Human Research Ethics Committee from 2012 to 2015, overseeing the ethical review of defence-related human research. He subsequently served as Colonel Commandant of the Victoria Region of the Royal Australian Army Medical Corps (RAAMC) from 2014 to 2018, before being appointed National Colonel Commandant of the RAAMC by the Chief of Army, a position he held from 2018 to 2024.

In 2026, Rosenfeld was appointed Specialist Medical Review Councillor for Veterans' Entitlements by the Australian Government's Department of Veterans' Affairs. In this ministerial appointment, he serves on the independent body responsible for providing expert medical advice on matters relating to veterans' entitlements and compensation.

=== Academic ===
As of November 2021, he is Senior Neurosurgeon in the Department of Neurosurgery at The Alfred Hospital, and the Emeritus Professor of Surgery at Monash University.

In addition to his role as the Emeritus Professor of Surgery at Monash University, Rosenfeld is also adjunct professor in Surgery, F. Edward Hébert School of Medicine, Uniformed Services University of the Health Sciences, Bethesda, Maryland, USA. He was Adjunct Professor (Research), Department of Electrical and Computer Systems Engineering, Monash University, Adjunct Honorary Professor in Surgery, Chinese University of Hong Kong, Founding Director, Monash Institute of Medical Engineering (MIME), Honorary Professor of Surgery, University of Papua New Guinea, and Honorary Consultant Neurosurgeon, Longgang Central Hospital, Shenzhen, Peoples Republic of China.

=== Clinical and research ===
"That's one of the big hurdles we've got in trauma today. We can fix broken bones, we can stop bleeding, we can save lives, with all our emergency surgery. But we still can't repair the broken brain very well."

— Jeffrey Rosenfeld

Rosenfeld's research has focussed on the areas of neurosurgery, traumatic brain injury, bionic vision, and medical engineering.

He pioneered the surgical technique to remove hypothalamic hamartomas from the brain. This type of tumour causes gelastic epilepsy, and they are located in a very inaccessible area inside the brain. The conventional surgical approach was to access the brain from below, because the tumour is closer to the bottom of the brain; Rosenfeld's novel approach was to access it from above, using a microscope to navigate down between the brain's hemispheres. In 1997, he performed the first such operation on 4-year-old Tom Leray-Meyer. Before the surgery, Leray-Meyer had the intellectual development of a one-year old, he could barely walk and he had fits every five to ten minutes. By 2001, his father was able to take him to see his first cricket match. The first international patient for this surgery was American Joelle Rue in May 2000, and she was followed by regular patients from overseas.

In 2001, he won international acclaim for performing life-changing surgery to remove a hypothalamic hamartoma from a nine-year-old British boy, Sebastian Selo. The technique had previously been used successfully on 18 children at that time, but Selo was the most critical; since he was a baby he suffered up to 100 epileptic fits each day and difficulty speaking, caused by a tumour the size of a grape which had grown in his brain, about 10 centimetres (4 in) down, from the top of the head, and behind his eyes. A surgery attempt in Britain four years earlier had not been successful, and caused a disabling stroke. Rosenfeld liquefied the tumour using a high-frequency aspirator so that it could then be sucked away in a four-hour operation. A year later, Selo's seizures were rare, and they did not prevent him leading a normal life. They were re-united in Great Britain when Rosenfeld visited to teach the technique to British neurosurgeons. After the attention for that success, children from around the world were coming to the Royal Children's Hospital for the same surgery and Rosenfeld personally performed over 70 of them.

Rosenfeld demonstrated the technique at several US hospitals where he was awarded The Sally Harrington Goldwater Memorial Visiting Professor Award from the Barrow Neurological Foundation, Phoenix, Arizona, USA in 2003, the LD Hupp Visiting Professorship in Paediatric Neurosurgery, University of Florida, Gainesville, USA in 2004 and the Inaugural Woodard Symposium Visiting Professorship in Neurosurgery, Louisiana State University Health Sciences Center, Shreveport, Louisiana USA in 2012.

He operated on the Australian celebrity Molly Meldrum after his brain injury, caused by a fall from a ladder in 2011.

In 2011, he published in The New England Journal of Medicine the first multicentre randomised controlled trial about the effectiveness of decompressive craniectomy (surgically removing a section of skull to allow the pressure from swelling to abate), compared to drug therapy.

His team has developed an artificial vision system named Gennaris that may provide a degree of sight for blind people. It uses special glasses that connect wirelessly to an implant on the surface of the brain, generating a matrix of 172 spots called "phosphenes" (to expand to 473) to allow that the person to perceive a rudimentary view of whatever is there. In July 2020, the team published a report of a trial of this technology in sheep. Human trials were planned initially with only a few volunteers, then increasing over time. Describing the level of detail they hope the devices will provide, Rosenfeld said "They won't be able to recognise the detail of a person's face... but they will be able to recognise where a staircase is, where a door or door handle is, common things you need to navigate... in everyday life."

== Neurotrauma and public service ==
Rosenfeld's principal academic and clinical interests are in neurotrauma, traumatic brain injury, and trauma systems. He served on the National Trauma Committee of the Royal Australasian College of Surgeons (RACS) from 1993 to 2018 and was subsequently appointed an Emeritus Member. Between 2000 and 2003, he served on the Victorian State Trauma Committee following appointment by the Minister for Health. He also served on the Victorian Ministerial Working Party and Task Force on Emergency Services and Trauma, the Consultative Committee on Road Traffic Fatalities, and the Medical Standards Committee of Ambulance Victoria from 2003 to 2016.

Rosenfeld chaired the Trauma Committee of the Neurosurgical Society of Australasia from 2000 to 2005. In recognition of his contributions to trauma care and research, he was appointed an Honorary Fellow of the Jamieson Trauma Institute at the Royal Brisbane and Women's Hospital and the Queensland University of Technology in 2018.

Rosenfeld has contributed to the development of international clinical practice guidelines for traumatic brain injury. He was a member of the multidisciplinary expert panel that produced the second edition of the Brain Trauma Foundation Guidelines for the Management of Penetrating Traumatic Brain Injury, published in Neurosurgery in 2026, including the accompanying treatment algorithms. He also contributed to the Brain Trauma Foundation Guidelines for the Management of Moderate and Severe Traumatic Brain Injury in Austere and Combat Environments.

Beyond medicine, Rosenfeld has held leadership roles in higher education, civic organisations, and veterans' affairs. He served as President of the Graduate Union of the University of Melbourne from 2012 to 2015. Between 2001 and 2004, he was National Vice-President and Victorian President of the United Nations Association of Australia.

His community service has been recognised by several civic organisations. He was awarded Honorary Membership of the Chadstone–East Malvern Rotary Club in 2007, the Melbourne Rotary Vocational Service Award in 2008, was named a Paul Harris Fellow in 2011, received the Paul Harris Fellow with Sapphire recognition from Bentleigh Rotary in 2012, and was awarded the Monash Medal by Melbourne Rotary in 2012. In 2015, he received the Returned and Services League (RSL) ANZAC of the Year Award.

== Public health advocacy ==
Rosenfeld has used his public profile to speak out on matters of violence and social justice.

In 2008, together with psychiatrist Major Nick Ford, he warned about unidentified brain injuries which returned military suffer, caused by pressure waves from explosions. More concerning, there could be a cumulative effect from exposure to multiple explosions. But there are no external wounds to see, so these injuries are often not detected. In Afghanistan, these invisible injuries make up some 12 per cent of wounds inflicted on Australian troops. In 2011, he organised an international conference on the topic, explaining that it can leave victims with brain damage, depression, and post-traumatic stress. In 2009, he compiled a collection of brain scans to show young people how just one blow to the head can be fatal, or lead to lifelong brain injury.

He was the keynote speaker at the 2020 Holocaust Remembrance Day, comparing it to the Rwandan genocide which he witnessed personally as a military surgeon.

He also contributed to the public debates on football's history of poorly managing cases of repeated head injuries, the value of making bicycle helmets compulsory, the role of alcohol in violent head injuries and in car crashes, and the risks of boxing.

== Published works ==
=== Journal articles ===
As of June 2026, PubMed listed 381 publications authored or co-authored by Rosenfeld while ResearchGate listed 397 publications According to Google Scholar, his h-index was 67.

=== Books ===
Rosenfeld has authored and edited books and academic monographs in neurosurgery, neurotrauma, and neuroscience, including:

- Master of Surgery (MS), University of Melbourne (1992). Thesis: Neural transplantation in mice: immunological and neurobiological considerations.
- Rosenfeld, Jeffrey V.; Watters, David A.K. (2000). Neurosurgery in the tropics: a practical approach to common problems. London: Macmillan. ISBN 9780333684122.
- Rosenfeld, Jeffrey V. (2005). The Surgical Treatment of Hypothalamic Hamartomas. Monash University.
- Rosenfeld, Jeffrey (2012). Practical management of head and neck injury. Chatswood, N.S.W.: Elsevier Health Sciences. ISBN 9780729579568.

Category Winner - Tertiary Education (Wholly Australian) Student Resource, Australian Publishers Association – Australian Educational Publishing Awards 2013.

In 2022, Rosenfeld completed a Master of Music (Research) at the University of Melbourne. His thesis, Developing a Performance Companion to the Third Clarinet Concerto of Carl Stamitz (1785) Played on the Five-Key Period Clarinet: An Analysis of Technical Capability Through Practice-Led Research, examined historical performance practice and clarinet technique.

As of November 2021, Monash University also lists 27 book chapters which he has published.

== Awards and recognition ==
Rosenfeld has received numerous national and international honours for his contributions to neurosurgery, medical research, military medicine, and public service. He was awarded the Centenary Medal by the Australian Government in 2003.

In the 2011 Queen's Birthday Jonours, Rosenfeld was appointed a Member of the Order of Australia (AM). In the 2013 Birthday Honours, he was appointed an Officer of the Order of the British Empire (OBE), presented in person by the Governor-General of Papua New Guinea. Then, in the Australia Day honours of 2018, he was appointed a Companion of the Order of Australia (AC) for "eminent service to medicine, particularly to the discipline of neurosurgery, as an academic and clinician, to medical research and professional organisations, and to the health and welfare of current and former defence force members". In October 2014, Rosenfeld was appointed a Knight of Grace of the Order of St John (KStJ).

Other recognition includes:

- 2001 - "Victorian of the Year" declared by Melbourne's Herald Sun newspaper
- 2009 - Michael E DeBakey International Military Surgeons' Award for excellence in military surgery
- 2012 - Rotary Club of Melbourne’s Monash Medal
- 2018 - International Lifetime Recognition Award from the American Association of Neurological Surgeons
- King James IV Professorship from the Royal College of Surgeons in Edinburgh
- Syme Professorship from the Royal College of Surgeons of Edinburgh
- Inaugural ‘Rosenfeld-Rekate HH Pioneer Award’. Hope for Hypothalamic Hamartomas Organisation. Washington, DC. USA, 13 September 2019
- The Sir Hugh Devine Medal 2019.
- Neurosurgery Society of Australasia (NSA) Medal 2019. Recognises outstanding contributions to the Neurosurgery Society of Australasia (NSA) and to neurosurgery.
- Sir John Eccles Oration, Neurosurgical Society Australasia and Australasian Neurosciences Society 2016.

=== Professional fellowships and board memberships ===
- 2016 - Fellow of the Australian Academy of Technological Sciences (FTSE)
- Fellow of the Australian Academy of Health and Medical Sciences (FAHMS)
- Fellow of Royal Australasian College of Surgeons (FRACS)
- Fellow of the Royal College of Surgeons (FRCS)(Edin)
- Fellow of the American College of Surgeons (FACS) since 1997
- International Fellow of the American Association of Neurological Surgeons (IFAANS)
- He was on the board of the Society for Brain Mapping & Therapeutics, based in California.
- John Mitchell Crouch Fellowship of the Royal Australasian College of Surgeons (RACS) for 2004.
- Honorary Fellowship, Royal College of Surgeons of Thailandros – July 2011
- Honorary Fellowship, College of Neurosurgeons of Thailand – February 2011
- Honorary Fellowship, Royal College of Surgeons and Physicians of Glasgow. March 2008.
- Since 2020, he has been a non-executive director of Clinuvel Pharmaceuticals
- Since 25 November 2022, he has been a director of The Spirit of Australia Foundation Ltd

=== Military decorations ===
- AASM (With CLASPS Rwanda, East Timor and Iraq), 2004.
- International Force East Timor (INTERFET) Medal (April 2001)
- Iraq Campaign Medal (2005)
- ASM (With Timor and Solomon Island CLASPS) (1999)
- Australian Operational Service Medal (AOSM) – Greater Middle East Operation (July 2017)
- Centenary of Federation Medal, (May 2003)
- Defence Long Service Medal (DLSM) with two clasps (2003)
- Australian Defence Medal
- St John Ambulance Long Service Medal with 3 clasps (1997)
- Meritorious Service Medal (USA) -8 November 2017
- US AirForce Commendation Medal -2 February 2007
- Timor Leste Solidarity Medal -June 2026
- Meritorious Unit Citation, Rwanda - July 2019
- Meritorious Unit Citation, Iraq - 26 January 2007

== Personal life ==
Rosenfeld is married with 3 adult children. He gives a lot of the credit for his own success to his wife, saying "I couldn't do what I have done without the work my wife does... We need to look at it as a partnership."

Outside medicine, Rosenfeld has had a longstanding association with St John Ambulance, volunteering in first aid services at major sporting events and serving as Commissioner of St John Ambulance Victoria

An accomplished clarinettist, Rosenfeld performed with the Australian Youth Orchestra and has served as Principal Clarinet with Corpus Medicorum, a Melbourne-based orchestra comprising medical professionals, as well as the Australian Doctors Orchestra. He holds a Licentiate from the Australian Music Examinations Board, a Graduate Diploma in Clarinet Performance, and a Master of Music (Performance) from the Melbourne Conservatorium of Music at the University of Melbourne.
