= 2011 Queen's Birthday Honours (Australia) =

British government recognitions

The Queen's Birthday Honours 2011 for Australia were announced on 13 June 2011.

† indicates an award given posthumously.

== Order of Australia ==
=== Companion (AC) ===
==== General Division ====
Recipient	Citation
The Honourable Justice Susan Mary Kiefel	For eminent service to the law and to the judiciary, to law reform and to legal education in the areas of ethics, justice and governance.

=== Officer (AO) ===
==== General Division ====
Recipient	Citation
The Honourable John Duncan Anderson	For distinguished service to the Parliament of Australia, particularly through support of rural and regional communities, transport development, and water management initiatives.
Alan John Cameron AM	For distinguished service to business and commerce, particularly through the promotion of regulatory standards, corporate governance and professional ethics, to tertiary education, and to the community.
The Honourable Justice Richard Noel Chesterman RFD	For distinguished service to the judiciary as a Judge of the Supreme Court of Queensland, and to the community, particularly through contributions to the Cancer Council at national and state levels.
Marie Yvonne Coleman PSM	For distinguished service to the advancement of women, particularly through the National Foundation for Australian Women and the Australian Women's Archives project.
Professor Graeme John Davison	For distinguished service to the community as a leading scholar and commentator on Australian urban history.
Michael Joseph Keelty APM	For distinguished service to national and international law enforcement, particularly through the establishment of bilateral agreements with corresponding overseas agencies and the integration of intelligence and law enforcement efforts within Australia.
Richard Denis Leplastrier	For distinguished service to architecture, particularly through the application of environmentally sensitive design, and as an educator and mentor.
Professor Rupert Donald Maclean	For distinguished service to technical and vocational education, particularly through the United Nations Educational, Scientific and Cultural Organisation.
The Honourable Brian Ross Martin	For distinguished service to the judiciary and the law, particularly as Chief Justice of the Northern Territory, and to the community through leadership roles with sporting and educational organisations.
Jonathan Mills	For distinguished service to the performing arts as a composer and director of international festivals, through the promotion of cultural exchange, and to public debate.
Professor John Charles Mulley	For distinguished service to medical science as a leading researcher in the field of human genetics, particularly through the identification of genes for epilepsy and intellectual disability, and their application to diagnosis.
Lisa Marian Paul PSM	For distinguished service to public sector leadership in key policy and program implementation, particularly through driving reform in education, employment and workplace relations.
Trevor Cyril Rowe AM	For distinguished service to the finance sector, particularly in the area of investment management, to higher education as Chancellor of Bond University, and to the community.
Dr John Michael Schubert	For distinguished service to business and commerce through leadership and management in the areas of financial services, transport and mining, and to the community.
Mark Walter Scott	For distinguished service to media and communications, and to the community through advisory and governance roles with a range of social justice and educational bodies.
Nicholas Peter Warner PSM	For distinguished service to public sector leadership through the development of policy, administration and reform in the areas of intelligence, defence and international relations.
Professor George John Williams	For distinguished service to the law in the fields of anti-terrorism, human rights and constitutional law as an academic, author, adviser and public commentator.
The Honourable Ralph Willis	For distinguished service to the Parliament of Australia, particularly in the areas of economic development and industrial relations, to the superannuation industry, and to the community.

=== Member (AM) ===
==== General Division ====
Recipient	Citation
Geoffrey George Ainsworth	For service to the visual and performing arts through the promotion and support of contemporary art, and to the community.
Elaine Jillian Attwood	For service to the community, particularly women, through executive roles with the National Council of Women, and as a contributor and advocate for consumer rights, human nutrition and health care policy development.
Professor Janette Brand-Miller	For service to education in the field of human nutrition as a researcher and academic, and as a supporter of people with a hearing impairment.
Associate Professor Trevor Murray Budge	For service to town planning, particularly the development of regional and rural communities in Victoria, and to education.
Dr Gregory Robert Burgess	For service to architecture in the area of environmentally sensitive building design, and to the community.
Emeritus Professor John Frederick Burrows	For service to education in the fields of computational stylistics and English literature as an academic and researcher.
Alexander David Campbell	For service to conservation and the environment, and through executive roles with agricultural and natural resource management organisations.
Arthur Stephen Cantrill	For service to the visual arts as a documentary and experimental film maker, and to education in the creative arts fields, particularly surrealism and avant-garde cinema.
Corinne Mozelle Cantrill	For service to the visual arts as a documentary and experimental film maker, and to education in the creative arts fields, particularly surrealism and avant-garde cinema.
Nelson Ripley Cooke	For service to music performance and education as a leading cellist and as a mentor of emerging young musicians.
Robert Edward Cronin	For service to the print media industry and journalism, and to the community through a range of cultural organisations and youth development programs.
Professor Suzanne Mary Crowe	For service to medical research in the area of HIV/AIDS medicine and infectious diseases as an academic, clinician and researcher, and to professional associations.
Nicholas Anthony Curtis	For service to the community through executive roles supporting medical research and health care organisations, and to Australia-China business relations.
Graham Robinson Davies	For service to primary industry, particularly the Australian sugar industry through executive roles, to the development of agri-business, and to regional communities.
The Honourable Robert John Debus	For service to the Parliaments of Australia and New South Wales, to the development of an emergency response framework, through contributions to legal and environmental reforms, and to the community.
Veronica Mary Dobson	For service to the Indigenous community as an Arrente elder and traditional owner, as a linguist, naturalist and ecologist, and to the preservation of Aboriginal language and culture in central Australia.
Professor David Sutton Dolan†	For service to education as an academic and researcher, particularly in the area of culture and heritage in Western Australia, and to youth.
Dr Michael John Dudley	For service to medicine as a clinician in the child and adolescent mental health area, to medical education, and to a range of professional associations.
Michael John Dwyer	For service to the superannuation industry through leadership and executive roles, and to the community through Australia for the United Nations High Commissioner for Refugees.
Professor Leslie David Field	For service to the administration of higher education, and to the discipline of chemistry as an academic and researcher.
Peter John FitzSimons	For service to literature as a biographer, sports journalist and commentator, and to the community through contributions to conservation, disability care, social welfare and sporting organisations.
Dr Joanna Mary Flynn	For service to medical administration and to the community, particularly in the areas of practice standards, regulation, professional education and as a general practitioner.
Peter Donald Fox	For service to the transport and logistics industry through a range of executive roles, and to the community, particularly to social welfare organisations.
Clinical Professor Jack Goldblatt	For service to medicine in the area of human genetics as a clinician and researcher, and to professional associations.
Dr Ian Geoffrey Gould	For service to the mining industry, particularly as a proponent of environmental management, to education as Chancellor of the University of South Australia, and to the community.
Emeritus Professor Elinor Ruth Grant	For service to the profession of physiotherapy, to education, and to the development of clinical health sciences in Australia.
Dr Barry Leon Hicks	For service to international humanitarian aid as a general and thoracic surgeon, and as an educator of medical trainees in Ethiopia.
Professor Lisa Rae Jackson Pulver	For service to medical education, particularly through the Muru Marri Indigenous Health Unit at the University of New South Wales, and as a supporter of education opportunities for Aboriginal and Torres Strait Islander people.
George Francis Jones	For service to the mining industry, to Australia-China business relations, and through executive roles with a range of youth care and hearing science organisations.
Emeritus Professor Warren Gordon Julian	For service to illuminating engineering, particularly in education and research, to educational administration, and to professional associations.
George Dimitri Kapetas	For service to the Greek community of the Northern Territory, to the promotion of the Hellenic language and culture, and to architecture.
Robert Curtis Kenzie QC	For service to the law, particularly as the Defence Force Advocate, and through the provision of advice on military industrial matters.
Gerard Francis Lawson	For service to the rice growing industry, as a supporter of agricultural research, and to the community.
Dr John Lockwood	For service to dentistry through executive roles at state and national level, to professional organisations, and to the sport of yachting.
Alastair Field Lucas	For service to medical administration, particularly through the Macfarlane Burnet Institute for Medical Research, to the financial sector, and to environmental organisations.
Shirley Dawn McCarron	For service to the community through the preservation and restoration of the Cascades Female Factory Historic Site, to women, and to the arts.
The Honourable Justice Peter David McClellan QC	For service to the judiciary through the Supreme Court of New South Wales, to environmental law, and to legal education.
Dr Edwin David McIntosh	For service to medicine, particularly in the areas of vaccines and infectious diseases, as an academic, and to the community through the Glebe Music Festival.
Emeritus Professor John Alexander McKenzie	For service to higher education through administrative roles, to professional associations, and to the community.
Dr Gregory Maxwell McKeon	For service to environmental science, to the development of sustainable resource management, and to research on the impact of climate change.
Robert John McLean	For service to social welfare through leadership roles in the not-for-profit sector, to conservation and the environment through The Nature Conservancy (Australia), and to business.
David Hugh MacIntosh	For service to the community through philanthropic contributions to health care and medical research organisations, to surf lifesaving, and to business.
Antony Dermott Macken	For service to the community, particularly the Sovereign Military Hospitaller Order of St John at a national and international level.
Dr Joseph Magliaro	For service to community health through the provision of psychological intervention and support programs, and support to personnel in the emergency services sector.
Associate Professor Bruce Atkinson Marshall	For service to the humanities and to education, particularly through the Australasian Society for Classical Studies.
Mary Elizabeth Martin	For service to the indigenous community through the Queensland Aboriginal and Islander Health Council, to the review of professional standards, and to community nursing.
Kumantjayi Napanangka†	For service to the arts as a contemporary Indigenous artist, to women painters of the Western Desert Art movement, and to the community of the Northern Territory.
Denis John Nelthorpe	For service to social justice and advocacy for consumers' rights, to the development of national credit legislation, and to the provision of legal services to the disadvantaged through a range of community organisations.
Associate Professor Lynne Douglas Oliver	For service to medical physics in the field of radiation oncology, and through executive roles with the Australasian College of Physical Scientists and Engineers in Medicine, and to professional associations.
Douglas William Paling	For service to the community through executive roles with Foodbank Western Australia, and to the promotion and development of healthy eating programs for children.
Professor Kerryn Lyndel Phelps	For service to medicine, particularly through leadership roles with the Australian Medical Association, to education and community health, and as a general practitioner.
Chad Mark Reed	For service to motorsports as a professional supercross motorcycle rider at national and international levels, and to the community.
Professor Susan Richardson	For service to the social sciences, particularly in the field of labour market economics as an academic and researcher, and through contributions to the development of socially inclusive public policy.
Trevor Clarence Roocke	For service to local government in South Australia, to emergency services and agricultural advisory boards, and to the rural community.
Professor Jeffrey Victor Rosenfeld	For service to medicine through clinical leadership and academic roles, particularly in the field of neurosurgery as a researcher and author, and to professional associations.
Professor Perminder Singh Sachdev	For service to medical research in the field of neuropsychiatry, as a clinician and academic, and to professional associations at a national and international level.
John Erik Scanlon	For service to environmental law nationally and internationally, particularly with the Convention on International Trade in Endangered Species and the United Nations Environment Programme, and to the advancement of biodiversity conservation.
Robert Leslie Seidler	For service to the international business community, to the development of Australia-Japan bilateral commercial relations, and through the generation of new business opportunities.
Dr Roger Neil Sexton	For service to business and to the investment banking sector as a contributor to a range of government, trade, and economic development organisations in South Australia.
Professor Kadambot Siddique	For service to agricultural science as an academic and researcher in the area of crop improvement and agronomy and through contributions to professional associations.
Shane David Simpson	For service to the law and to the arts through leading roles in intellectual property and entertainment law, and as a contributor to a range of cultural organisations.
Professor Malcolm Douglas Smith	For service to medicine in the field of rheumatology as a clinician, academic and researcher, and through contributions to professional organisations.
Dr Anthony Sprent	For service to the community through the promotion, design and implementation of technical solutions for people with disabilities, and to spatial science and astronomy.
Natasha Jessica Stott Despoja	For service to the Parliament of Australia, particularly as a Senator for South Australia, through leadership roles with the Australian Democrats, to education, and as a role model for women.
Edgar Norman Swane	For service to horticulture and to business, to the development and promotion of the Australian native plants export trade, and through executive roles with a range of industry-based organisations.
Maxwell Henry Walker	For service to cricket at a national and international level as a player and commentator, and to the community through a range of youth and social welfare organisations.
Professor Sally Ann Walker	For service to the higher education sector through leadership and administrative roles, to the advancement of women, and to the law as an academic.
Emeritus Professor Christopher Keith Wallace-Crabbe	For service to the arts as a leading poet, critic and educator, and as an ambassador and advocate for the humanities both nationally and internationally, and through support for emerging writers.
John Ernest Walsh	For service to the community, particularly in the areas of disability and health policy, to people with a spinal cord injury, and to the actuarial profession.
Barbara Kay Ward	For service to business and commerce through a range of executive positions with private, public and professional organisations.
Steven Monteith Wilson	For service to business, and to the financial services industry in Queensland, and to the community through leadership roles in cultural heritage, sport, and social welfare organisations.
Emeritus Professor Richard Stafford Wright	For service to Indigenous and forensic archaeology and anthropology, to education, and to professional associations.
Peter Wilson Yates	For service to education, to the financial services industry through the development of the Australian Financial Management Association of Australia, and to a range of arts, science and charitable organisations.

==== Military Division ====
Branch	Recipient	Citation
Navy	Commodore David James Letts CSM	For exceptional service as Director General Navy People and as Head Navy People and Reputation.
Navy	Captain Charles Neville McHardie	For exceptional service in the field of Naval Warfare.
Navy	Commodore Roderick Robert Nairn	For exceptional service in the field of hydrography and as the Australian Hydrographer.
Army	Major General Richard Maxwell Burr DSC MVO	For exceptional service as the Director General Preparedness and Plans in Army Headquarters and as the Director General Military Strategic Commitments.
Army	Brigadier Peter Robin Jeffrey CSC RFD	For exceptional service as Assistant Commander, Training Command – Army, and as the Commander of the 11th Brigade.
Army	Brigadier Jeffery John Sengelman DSC CSC	For exceptional service as the Deputy Special Operations Commander Australia, Chief of Staff in Special Operations Command, and Commander of the 6th Brigade.
Army	Colonel Simon Andrew Stuart	For exceptional service as the Commander Joint Task Force 631 on Operation ASTUTE in East Timor from February to October 2010.
Army	Brigadier Philip Douglas Winter CSC	For exceptional service as the Commander, Australian Defence Force Counter Improvised Explosive Device Task Force.
Air Force	Air Commodore Peter David Brennan CSM	For exceptional performance of duty in the field of Defence Logistics and as the Director General Logistics Assurance, Joint Logistics Command.
Air Force	Wing Commander Ian Scott Henderson	For exceptional service in the field of military law.
Air Force	Warrant Officer John Joseph Millar	For exceptional service in the field of senior-level managerial and representational duties as Warrant Officer Disciplinary on deployment and as Warrant Officer of the Royal Australian Air Force.
Air Force	Air Commodore Richard David Owen	For exceptional performance of duty in senior Australian Defence Force command and staff appointments, including as Commandant of the Australian Defence Force Warfare Centre and Joint Warfare Doctrine and Training Centre and as Chief of Staff Headquarters Air Command.

=== Medal (OAM) ===
==== General Division ====
Recipient	Citation
John Adams	For service to the community of the Grafton region through historical, environmental and youth organisations.
Beverley Adcock	For service to the community, particularly through the Asthma Foundation of New South Wales
James Ramsay Affleck	For service to veterans and their families, particularly through the writing of military biographies.
Constantina Amanatidis	For service to the Greek community through contributions to multicultural organisations and as an author.
Sharon Ronda Anderson	For service to the Indigenous community in far north Queensland in the fields of aged care assistance and assistance for people with a disability.
Wilfred Granville Ardill	For service to industrial relations in Queensland, and to the community.
Jone Yvonne Armstrong	For service to the community through the Rainbow of the Southern Highlands organisation.
Graham Eric Ashman	For service to the barley growing industry, and to the community.
Allan Lyle Backhouse	For service to youth, and to the community of the Dubbo region.
Jernej Bajzelj	For service to the community of Ulverstone.
Vicki Lorraine Bakunowicz	For service to children in the Northern Territory.
Alison Margaret Banks	For service to youth, particularly through the Guiding movement, and to the community.
Jennifer Aimee Bantow	For service to the community through heritage and historical organisations.
Dr Jayant Bhalchandra Bapat	For service to the Hindu community in Australia, and to education.
Allan Leo Baptist	For service to the arts, and to the community of the Shoalhaven region.
Heather Barclay	For service to the community of Berrigan.
Ian Lawrence Barclay	For service to tennis through coaching and player development roles.
Dr Rodney Paul Barkman	For service to the community of Corowa as a general practitioner.
David Grosvenor Barnsdall	For service to the community through the Hamlin Fistula Australia organisation.
Graham Alfred Bartle	For service to music education.
Gregory Llewellyn Bassani	For service to music through the Australian Pipe Band Association.
Kathleen Joy Batchelor	For service to music through the Bunyip Country Music Festival.
Helen Gwennyth Bawden	For service to the community as a volunteer in a range of social welfare, historical and women's organisations.
Dr John Clayton Beattie	For service to medicine through administrative roles and to the discipline of cardiology and general medicine.
Rodney William Beattie	For service to former prisoners of war and their families through roles with the Commonwealth War Graves Commission and the Thailand–Burma Railway Centre.
Alexander John Beccari	For service to the community of Mount Kembla.
Eric Bernard Bell	For service to the Indigenous community through aged care, environment and employment organisations.
Dr Howard Charles Bell	For service to the community through social justice and legal organisations.
Francis Harding Benfield	For service to veterans.
Noel James Berlowitz	For service to surf lifesaving.
William John Berry	For service to the law, and to the community.
The Reverend Father Francis Ferruccio Bertagnolli	For service to youth, and to the Order of the Salesians of Don Bosco.
Deanna Blacher	For service to the performing arts as a Spanish dancer, teacher and choreographer.
Peter Bondfield	For service to the community through the Stanthorpe Agricultural Show Society and the Pony Club Association of Queensland.
Dr Margaret Fanny Bowman	For service to local government as an educator and researcher.
Charles Edward Boyter	For service to the performing arts as a country music entertainer.
Raymond Bruce Bailey	For service to veterans and their families.
Reginald Hilton Brandis	For service to athletics.
Mark Alexander Brian	For service to the community of Hamilton.
Colin Alexander Brick	For service to the community of Boolarra.
Kenneth Edward Briggs	For service to the community of Bendigo through a range of organisations.
Bronwyn Elizabeth Brown	For service to the community through the Ronald McDonald House Charities.
Wallace George Bruce	For service to the performing arts, and to the community of Yarrawonga Mulwala.
Beris Jean Campbell	For service to aged persons through the Wesley Homeshare Program.
Dr Betty Thomasina Capper	For service to nursing as an educator and administrator, and as an historian.
Ann Carlyon	For service to the community through a range of fundraising roles.
John Carmichael	For service to the arts as a concert pianist and composer.
Nigel Bruce Carrall	For service to the St John's Anglican Cathedral, Brisbane through contributions to its completion.
Margaret Sheila Catterall	For service to the community through a range of Jewish organisations, and to the Gemmological Association of Australia.
Danielle Charak	For service to women, to education, and to the Jewish community.
Dr Naren Chellappah	For service to the international community as a volunteer dental surgeon.
Bevan Christensen	For service to the community, particularly as an organist to Masonic Lodges.
Laurence Douglas Christie	For service to the community of Mango Hill, and to cricket.
Reginald Bruce Church	For service to cricket.
Paul Michael Clancy	For service to the Australian wine industry, and to the community.
Kenneth John Clarke	For service to the community of Wangaratta.
Dr Maureen Patricia Cleary	For service to the community, particularly through the not-for-profit sector.
Ronald David Cragg	For service to the performing arts as a violinist.
Patricia Grace Creed	For service to nursing, particularly through the provision of specialised care for breast cancer patients.
Robert John Cross	For service to Australian Rules football.
Janine Cullen	For service to business and regional development in the Illawarra area.
Gretel Anne Dabovich	For service to archery.
Lesley Ann Dalziel	For service to conservation and to the environment.
Dr Anne Francis D'Arcy	For service to emergency medicine, and to professional organisations.
Pamela Helen Darling	For service to the community through the Berwick Mechanics Institute and Free Library.
Dr David Charles Davidson	For service to medicine in the field of orthopaedics.
Councillor Janet Elizabeth Davidson	For service to local government, and to women.
Ralph Craig Davies	For service to the community of the Mitchelton region.
John Winzor Day	For service to the community through the Prospect Blair Athol Lions Club.
Don Victor De Giglio ASM	For service to motorsports in official and voluntary roles.
Richard John Delbridge	For service to the community of Lake Macquarie.
Alderman Giuseppe Delle Donne	For service to local government, and to the City of Canning.
Dr Ian Tudor De Mellow	For service to aged welfare.
Sister Patricia Dent	For service to the Catholic Church, and to children's music.
Barbara Ellen Dillon	For service to youth through the Guiding movement.
Professor Stephen Kenneth Dinham	For service to educational research, and to professional associations.
Eileen Miriam Dinning	For service to the community of the Wangaratta region.
Dr Phillip Raymond Donato	For service to community health as a chiropractor, and to education.
James Allen Dryden	For service to surf lifesaving.
Colonel Jeffery Dunn CSM RFD	For service to the community of Darwin.
Professor Helen Ethel Edwards	For service to nursing education and research, and to professional associations.
John Hamilton Elliott AFSM	For service to fire and emergency service organisations in Mount Gambier.
Robert Anthony Ellis	For service to Vietnam veterans and their families.
Jane Helen Elton-Brown	For service to music.
Alan Warne Eustace	For service to youth.
Suzanne Eileen Evans	For service to the community through fundraising activities with a range of organisations.
Alan Robert Fairbanks	For service to netball.
John Sidney Farr	For service to local government, and to the community of Cabonne.
Kevin John Faulks†	For service to business, and to the community of Wyong.
Joan Eileen Fisher	For service to veterans, and to the community.
Delma Lucille Fitton	For service to the community of Toowoomba, and to the promotion of the thoroughbred horse industry.
Marlene Estelle Ford	For service to the community of Tamworth through a range of historical and social welfare organisations.
Bruce Alexander Fuhrer	For service to conservation and the environment as an amateur naturalist and botanical photographer.
Eleanor Faye Galt	For service to clinical psychology and to public health, particularly through support for people undergoing colorectal surgery.
Elizabeth Ann Garland	For service to veterans and their families in the Lakemba area.
Susanne Julia Gervay	For service to children's literature, and to professional organisations.
Neville Dean Gibbs	For service to gymnastics.
Judith Ann Gifford	For service to nursing mothers through the Australian Breastfeeding Association.
Catherine Merle Gilbo	For service to science as a biochemist, and to the community.
Roy Beale Gilchrist	For service to the community, particularly through the Baptist Union of New South Wales.
Professor Maree Gleeson	For service to medicine through the Hunter Medical Research Institute, to education, and to professional associations.
Wayne Terence Gobert	For service to the community through a range of charitable organisations.
Elizabeth Jane Grace	For service to the community of Nundah.
Malcolm Sidney Grant	For service to youth through the Scouting movement, and to the community.
Brian Andrew Greig	For service to the community as a social justice advocate for the gay and lesbian community.
Alan John Griffin	For service to Australian Rules football at the junior level.
Kerrie Louise Griffith	For service to public education in the Shoalhaven area.
Lynne Margaret Hanton	For service to ballet in the Northern Territory as a teacher and artistic director.
Frederick John Harrington	For service to the non-indigenous community of Eltham.
Brian William Hawdon	For service to the community through fundraising roles.
Arthur James Hayes	For service to the community of Deception Bay.
Helen Marianne Heath	For service to the community of Dandenong.
Rabbi Philip Walter Heilbrunn	For service to the St Kilda Hebrew Congregation, and to the community.
Robert Edward Henderson	For service to the community of Hamilton.
David Gavin Heyne	For service to the Indigenous community of Ceduna, and to the Lutheran Church.
Thomas Francis Hogan	For service to veterans and their families, and to the community of Orange.
Graham Keith Hoinville	For service to motor sport through a range of technical and executive roles.
Nancy Irene Horne	For service to local government, and to the community of Hornsby.
Robert William Horsfall	For service to the Australian entertainment industry as an actor, radio presenter and musician.
Beverley Joan Hoskins	For service to the community of Blackburn.
Robert Marshalsie Hoskins	For service to the community of Blackburn.
Marie Helen Hudson	For service to the community through the Cobar branch of the Country Women's Association.
Alexander Sergei Hughes	For service to the Russian community of New South Wales.
Kevin Vincent Humphrey	For service to the community of Cressy.
Dr Bruce Wallace Ingram	For service to medicine as a general practitioner, and to professional associations.
Paul Anthony Innes	For service to the thoroughbred horseracing industry, particularly through the Australian Jockeys' Association.
Merle Isbister ASM	For service to local government, and to the community.
Theodore Iuliano	For service to football in South Australia, and to the Italian community.
Ivan George Johnson	For service to surf lifesaving.
Patricia Mary Johnson	For service to veterans and their families through the Central Council of Women's Auxiliaries of the South Australian Branch of the Returned and Services League of Australia.
Ronald George Jordan	For service to swimming in New South Wales.
Gertrude Franziska Kallir	For service to the environment, particularly through the Ryde Hunters Hill Flora and Fauna Preservation Society, to women, and to the community.
Glen Leslie Keamy	For service to the stud merino industry, and to local government.
Ronald John Kilcullen	For service to the building industry in Western Australia, and to the community.
Dr Anthony John Kirkwood	For service to medicine as an anaesthetist.
The Reverend Dr Raymond James Laird	For service to the study of theology.
Ross Gregory Lake	For service to arts administration, to social welfare, and to the community.
Margory Joan Lapworth	For service to the community, particularly through Warrandyte Housing and Support Services.
Richard Charles Larter	For service to the visual arts as a painter.
Dr Christopher Forbes Laurie	For service to the community, particularly through the Adelaide Botanic Gardens Foundation.
Peter John Lawler	For service to athletics as a competitor and coach.
Ernest Richard Lawrence	For service to lawn bowls.
Christopher John Leahy	For service to Australian Rules football in South Australia.
Keith Kyong-jae Lee	For service to the Korean community.
Lewis Meng Lee	For service to the Chinese community of Brisbane.
Robyn Margaret Leggatt	For service to women's hockey as a player and coach.
Dr Richard Wayne Lehmann	For service to medicine as a general practitioner in the Temora region.
Gordon Albert Leue	For service to local government, to lawn bowls, and to the community.
William Edward Levy	For service to veterans and their families through the Coolamon Sub-Branch of the Returned and Services League of Australia.
Mervyn John Lewis	For service to natural resource management, and to community health.
Maria Lewit	For service to the Jewish Holocaust Museum and Research Centre as a volunteer, and to literature as a writer and educator.
Colin Edgar Lienert	For service to the pig industry, and to the community.
Dr Patrick Verney Lightfoot	For service to conservation and the environment in the Hunter region.
Jill Lorraine Lindsay†	For service to sports administration, particularly through the Australian Football League and women's softball.
Meredith Rosalind Lines	For service to the community as a volunteer and fundraiser for a range of charitable organisations.
Trevor Robert Little	For service to the thoroughbred horseracing industry in South Australia.
Andrew James Lock	For service to mountaineering.
Geoffrey Allan Lodge	For service to ornithology.
Michele Lombardo	For service to the harness racing industry.
Muriel Florance McCabe	For service to the community through Torchbearers for Legacy New South Wales and to lawn bowls.
Marion Carmel McCall	For service to aviation through the Australian Women Pilots' Association.
Janet McCulloch	For service to the arts, and to aged care and disability service organisations in Ballarat.
Gail Vicki MacDonell	For service to veterans and their families through the Partners of Veterans Association of Australia.
Michelle Gaye McGrath	For service to community health through Alzheimer's Australia in the Canberra region.
David Stewart McKerrell	For service to primary industry, and to the community.
Gregory John McLean	For service to industrial relations.
Emma Kate McLeod	For service to community health through the Stillbirth Foundation Australia.
Major John Joseph McNeill	For service to the community, particularly veterans and their families.
Dr Peter Alexander Macdonald	For service to local government, and to medicine.
Hazel Edith Magann	For service to the community through a range of historical organisations.
Valerie Mary March	For service to the Indigenous community, particularly through the Booroongen Djugun Aboriginal Corporation.
Ian Harold Marshall	For service to surveying and mapping.
Suzanne, Lady Martin	For service to youth through the Sir David Martin Foundation.
Wayne Sidney Mason	For service to athletics as a coach and administrator.
Leon Marcus Massoni†	For service to the tourism and hospitality industry as a restaurateur and vigneron.
Charles John Massey	For service to the wool industry, and to the community.
Kathleen Margret Masters	For service to people with a disability in Western Australia.
Helen Elizabeth Maxwell	For service to the museum and galleries sector.
Trevor John Mayhew	For service to St John Ambulance New South Wales, and to the community.
Maureen Merrick	For service to cycling.
Neville David Mibus	For service to social welfare through Community Flood SA.
Elizabeth Anne Miles	For service to psychiatric nursing.
Dorothy Elaine Mills	For service to athletics.
Jane Mills	For service to women's health, and through contributions to drug- and alcohol-related programs.
Gary Ian Morris	For service to the Indigenous community, particularly through the Booroongen Djugun Aboriginal Corporation.
Stanley Edward Moses	For service to Australian Rules football in Western Australia.
Dr Annie Moulden	For service to medicine as a paediatrician, and to medical administration.
Veronica Anne Moylan	For service to music.
Bernard Anthony Mungoven	For service to the Catholic Church as a volunteer archivist.
Josephine Margaret Munro	For service to youth through the Guiding movement, and to the community.
James Bryan Murch	For service to the community through the Macquarie Branch of National Seniors Australia.
George Maxwell Neilson	For service to rowing, and to the community.
Edward James Nestor†	For service to cycling as a coach and official.
Raymond John Newey	For service to the community in the Millers Point area.
Gordon Lauri Newton	For service to the community, particularly through Wesley College.
Margaret Norman	For service to people with a disability through Riding for the Disabled.
Barry Newton Novy	For service to the community, particularly children, as a fundraiser for charitable organisations.
Peter Anthony Nunan	For service to the community as a volunteer with maritime and geographical organisations.
Violet Nutt	For service to youth, and to the community.
Elizabeth O'Brien	For service to women, particularly through the delivery of educational programs in the prison system.
Robert James Osborne	For service to local government, and to the community through a range of health, service and sporting organisations.
Wilfred James Osborne	For service to the thoroughbred horseracing industry, and to the community.
Barry Thomas O'Shea	For service to local government, and to the community of Dalby.
Edward William O'Toole	For service to the community of Whitehorse through social welfare and service organisations.
Elizabeth Lorraine O'Toole	For service to the community of Whitehorse through social welfare and service organisations.
Helen Mawditt Page	For service to the community, particularly through the Australian Garden History Society.
Robert Parr	For service to the community as a contributor to charitable fundraising activities.
David Walter Partridge	For service to the dairy industry in Western Australia, and to the community.
David Clifford Payten	For service to veterans through the Seventh Australian Infantry Division Association.
Oswald James Pearce	For service to veterans through the 2/1 Field Regiment Association.
Roland John Perry	For service to literature as an author.
Damian Bruce Pike	For service to the fresh fruit and vegetable industry.
Edward Charles Plunkett†	For service to the community of the Canberra region through a range of organisations.
Clarence Charles Pollard	For service to the community, particularly through the Payneham Sub-Branch of the Returned and Services League of Australia.
Dr James Stephen Pollock	For service to wildlife conservation.
Colleen Hilda Potts	For service to the performing arts in the Hunter region.
Helen Mary Preston	For service to conservation and the environment.
Ian Leslie Ramsay	For service to community health, particularly for people with an acquired brain injury, and to a range of service organisations.
John Maxwell Ramsey	For service to basketball as an administrator, official and mentor, and to the Australian Railway Historical Society, South Australia.
Franklin Ernest Randall	For service to the community of Norfolk Island, particularly through the preservation of the Kingston and Arthur's Vale historic capital area.
Denis Frederick Ranger RFD	For service to veterans in South Australia through administrative roles.
Dennis Leslie Rayner	For service to veterans and their families through the Doyalson-Wyee Sub-Branch of the Returned and Services League of Australia.
Susan Gail Reynolds	For service to the community, particularly through the Yackandandah and District Historical Society.
Edward Dudley Richardson	For service to mariners through the Stella Maris Apostleship of the Sea.
Dr Gregory James Rickard	For service to nursing.
Noel John Ridgeway	For service to the Indigenous community as an elder and traditional owner of the Worimi Nation.
Clarence Edward Roach	For service to veterans in Tasmania, and to the community.
Dr Harley Stuart Roberts	For service to medicine as an obstetrician and gynaecologist.
Dr Peter James Robinson	For service to medicine as a general practitioner in the Deniliquin region.
Angela Carmel Rodriquez	For service to the community through support roles with the Christopher Robin Committee at the Sydney Children's Hospital.
Dr Natale Anthony Romeo	For service to the community through fundraising roles with the Italian Affair Committee.
Professor John Peterson Royle	For service to medicine as a vascular surgeon, to professional associations, and to medical education, particularly relating to safety in the operating theatre.
Dr Pamela Margaret Ryan	For service to psychology as a practitioner and researcher.
George Michael Saliba	For service to the Maltese community.
Darryl Richard Seccombe	For service to the community through a range of charitable organisations.
Brian Shanahan	For service to the Irish community, and to local government.
Michelle Ann Sharkey	For service to community health through the Stroke Recovery Association of New South Wales.
Kaye Marie Shephard	For service to the community of Moruya through pastoral care and volunteer roles.
The Reverend Christine Sheppard	For service to the community as a mental health chaplain in the Hunter New England region.
Leslie Robert Sims	For service to the community through St John Ambulance Australia.
John Crawford Skene	For service to swimming in the Canberra region through technical and administrative roles.
Allen Michael Smith	For service to surf lifesaving in Western Australia.
Anthony George Smith	For service to the community through the St Vincent de Paul Society.
Carmel Rose Smith	For service to the community through the St Vincent de Paul Society.
William Alistair Spear	For service to the community in South Australia.
Douglas Dean Spencer	For service to the community through a range of social welfare and service organisations, and to the law.
Maureen Stephenson	For service to netball, and to youth.
David John Stewart AFSM	For service to the community of Mount Barker.
Richard John Stone	For service to the community, particularly through the Australian Red Cross.
Clinical Associate Professor Catherine Elizabeth Storey	For service to medicine in the field of neurology, to stroke education, and to professional associations.
Dr Nicholas Alexander Talley	For service to medicine in the field of gastroenterology.
John Frederick Tame	For service to the community of Frankston through a range of organisations.
Elise Maree Terrill	For service to the community of Rutherglen, particularly through the St Vincent de Paul Society.
Mary-Lou Terry	For service to young people as a foster carer.
Philip Graham Thompson	For service to the community, particularly through Apex Australia, and to aged care.
Margaret Joy Tickle	For service to the community of Busselton, and as an oral historian.
Professor Andrew Maxwell Tonkin	For service to medical research in the field of epidemiology and preventative medicine.
Sister Rita Agnes Torpey	For service to education through the development and administration of educational institutions in Papua New Guinea.
Marie Olive Trembath	For service to the community through volunteer roles with Meals on Wheels, church and charitable organisations.
Natalie Tyrawski-Radywyl	For service to the Ukrainian community as an artistic director and choreographer of traditional dance.
Shirley Norma Underwood	For service to youth through the Guiding movement, and to the community.
Peter William Vandepeer	For service to the sport and recreation industry in South Australia.
Gerald Chapman Victor	For service to the community of Rockhampton through contributions to a range of social welfare, housing and skills development organisations.
Rodney John Viney	For service to youth through the Scouting movement, and to Sailability Tasmania.
Susan Mary Viney	For service to youth through the Guiding movement, and to the community.
Gordon Charles Wallace	For service to youth through The Boys' Brigade Queensland.
Sister Anna Warlow	For service to the Catholic Church, and to St Paul's Community House of Welcome.
Gordon Kerion Watson	For service to the community, and to local government.
Cheryl Margaret Webster	For service to the community through the provision of assistance to refugees from Africa.
Patricia Wellington	For service to the Launceston Horticultural Society.
Bruce Raymond White	For service to the beekeeping industry.
Kathleen Anne White	For service to the community through contributions to the transport industry, particularly the Lights on the Hill Trucking Memorial.
Sylvia Joyce Whiting	For service to animal conservation through the Wildlife Volunteers Association.
Daniel John Whitty	For service to the community of Lithgow.
Elizabeth Nicole Williams	For service to paediatric physiotherapy, and to the rural community of Victoria.
Allan Laurie Wilson	For service to the veteran community, particularly through the Gloucester Sub-Branch of the Returned and Services League of Australia.
Clyde William Wode	For service to the community through Anglicare Central Queensland.
Diana Jean Wode	For service to the community through Anglicare Central Queensland.
Professor Peter William Wolnizer	For service to higher education in the field of business and economics as an academic and administrator.
Dr Thomas John Woolard	For service to rehabilitation medicine in the Hunter area as a practitioner and administrator.
William James Worth	For service to surf lifesaving at state and national levels.
Major Peter Carey Wright	For service to the community through chaplaincy and pastoral care roles, and to The Salvation Army.
Associate Professor James MacDougall Wyllie	For service to medicine as a surgeon, to medical administration and professional associations, and to the community of Mount Druitt.
Maureen Therese Zampatti	For service to music as a teacher, and to the community of Geelong.

==== Military Division ====
Branch	Recipient	Citation
Navy	Commander Lee Terence Argar	For meritorious service as the Staff Officer One Offshore Plans, Chief of Staff Commander Australian Surface Task Group, Chief of Staff Australian Fleet Battle Staff, and as Chief of Staff Combined Task Force 150.
Navy	Petty Officer Matthew Charles Wood	For meritorious service in health care as an Underwater Medicine Sailor in the Royal Australian Navy.
Army	Warrant Officer Class One Trudy Marie Casey	For meritorious performance of duty as Regimental Sergeant Major of the 1st Combat Signal Regiment and inaugural Force Communications Unit.
Army	Warrant Officer Class One John Patrick Kirkham CSM	For meritorious service as the Regimental Sergeant Major of the 5th Combat Engineer Regiment in 2007, and the 1st Combat Engineer Regiment from 2008 to 2010.
Army	Warrant Officer Class One Gregory Dean McEvoy	For meritorious service in the field of Material Maintenance.
Army	Warrant Officer Class One John Griffin Phillips	For meritorious service as the Regimental Sergeant Major of 6th Aviation Regiment, 5th Aviation Regiment, 16th Aviation Brigade, and as the Aviation Corps Career Manager.
Air Force	Warrant Officer Raymond Edward Bolton	For meritorious service to the Royal Australian Air Force in the field of combat support and force protection.
Air Force	Wing Commander Nicholas James Dyce-McGowan	For meritorious service to the Royal Australian Air Force in the field of Joint Battlefield Airspace Control.

== Public Service Medal (PSM) ==
Branch	Recipient	Citation
Aust.	Elizabeth Astone	For outstanding public service in the delivery of innovative Centrelink services to vulnerable young people in detention centres in Western Australia.
Aust.	Liza Carroll	For outstanding public service in delivering Ahead of the Game: Blueprint for Reform of Australian Government Administration.
Aust.	Hae-Kyong Holdaway	For outstanding public service in strengthening the Australia-Korea bilateral relationship, particularly through major contributions to the successful outcome of the G-20 in Korea in 2010.
Aust.	Erin Kathleen Holland	For outstanding public service in significantly improving revenue and service delivery outcomes for the Australian Taxation Office.
Aust.	Brian Alan Huddleston	For outstanding public service in planning the introduction into service of the MRH90 troop lift helicopter.
Aust.	Kathryn Michelle Kennedy	For outstanding public service in providing high level intelligence research and analysis in relation to serious criminal activities within the Sydney Airport precinct.
Aust.	John Anton Kovacic	For outstanding public service in leading the development and implementation of new workplace relations laws and policies and award modernisation.
Aust.	Robert John Nash	For outstanding public service in driving significant improvements in Australia's passport system.
Aust.	Adam James Rodgers	For outstanding public service in the development and implementation of the Fair Work Ombudsman's suite of on-line tools to assist employers and employees in the transition to modern awards.
Aust.	May Tanglee	For outstanding public service in advancing Australia's relationship with the People's Republic of China, particularly in the area of tourism.
Aust.	Stuart Robert Thorn	For outstanding public service in protecting Australia's national security interests.
Aust.	Andrew Keith Tongue	For outstanding public service in the development of public policy, particularly in the areas of aviation security, Indigenous affairs and social housing.
Aust.	John William Wadeson	For outstanding public service in driving and leading significant reform of information communications technology in the Human Services portfolio.
Aust.	Phyllis Dedja Williams	For outstanding public service in driving significant reforms to communications and service delivery in the National Archives of Australia, particularly in relation to Indigenous Australians in the Northern Territory.
NSW	Michael James Arandt	For outstanding public service to water management in New South Wales.
NSW	Thomas John Bagnat	For outstanding public service to the National Parks and Wildlife Service in New South Wales.
NSW	James Alexander Christian	For outstanding public service to Indigenous affairs in the NSW Department of Human Services.
NSW	John Brown Cumberford	For outstanding public service to the provision of library services in New South Wales.
NSW	Shirley Anne Fuller	For outstanding public service to the provision of educational services in the New England region.
NSW	Fiona Margaret Howard	For outstanding public service to the provision of educational services in the NSW Police Force.
NSW	Stewart James McLeod	For outstanding public service in the areas of water supply and sewerage management in New SOuth Wales, particularly in the Dubbo region.
NSW	Dianne Jeanette Marshall	For outstanding public service to the provision of educational services in New South Wales.
NSW	Rodney Kelvin Stowe	For outstanding public service in the provision of consumer protection to the community of New South Wales.
NSW	Joseph William Waugh	For outstanding public service to the NSW Law Reform Commission.
Vic.	Paul Jeffrie Acreman	For outstanding public service and strong commitment to public housing clients and citizens of the north and western suburbs of Melbourne.
Vic.	Dr Anne Marie Astin	For outstanding public service, particularly leadership and service excellence to the dairy industry, national food safety regulation and women's development.
Vic.	Brian Ernest Billington	For outstanding public service and ongoing commitment to community improvement, particularly in rural areas.
Vic.	Susan Maree Hine	For outstanding public service, particularly in fostering community partnership between Victoria Police, community groups and the Indigenous community.
Vic.	Dr Bruce Kefford	For outstanding public service and leadership in science and public administration associated with the primary industries sector.
Vic.	Neil Bruce Robertson	For outstanding public service and leadership through the provision of innovative legal policy in a diverse range of areas.
Vic.	Arthur Rogers	For outstanding public service and leadership in the redesign of Victoria's disability service.
Vic.	William Stanley Thomas	For outstanding public service and exceptional contribution as a leader in sustainability education.
Vic.	Ian Edward Voigt	For outstanding public service in the sustainable management of land, water and biodiversity through practical and sustained leadership.
Qld	Stewart Lynn Bell	For outstanding public service to the Department of Employment, Economic Development and Innovation, particularly in the area of Mine Safety and Health.
Qld	Ricky Leslie Cox	For outstanding public service to the Department of Transport and Main Roads, particularly in the area of Road Design and Innovation.
Qld	Peter James Davis	For outstanding public service to Education Queensland, particularly in the area of Special Education.
Qld	Paul Florian	For outstanding public service to Queensland Health, particularly in the areas of Environmental and Public Health.
Qld	Captain Patrick John Quirk	For outstanding public service to Maritime Safety Queensland, particularly in the areas of Maritime Safety and Marine Environment Protection.
WA	Alastair John Bryant	For outstanding public service as an outstanding leader in the areas of business management, strategic planning and the arts over many years.
WA	John Dell	For outstanding public service to the advancement of natural history and conservation.
WA	Catherine Rose Harrison	For outstanding public service at Parliament House in Perth, Western Australia.
WA	David Martin Hillyard	For outstanding public service in the areas of consumer protection and fair trading.
SA	Philippa Anne Aston	For outstanding public service in the area of housing for people with special needs.
SA	Susan Carol Ireland	For outstanding public service in the area of health services.
SA	Professor Paddy Andrew Phillips	For outstanding public service in the area of health services.
Tas	Byron Douglas Cross	For outstanding public service to the Tasmanian legal community in the establishment of effective systems which benefit all lawyers and clients involved with the Legal Aid Commission in Tasmania.

== Australian Police Medal (APM) ==
Branch	Recipient
Australian Federal Police	Superintendent Barry Roy Corrigan
Australian Federal Police	Assistant Commissioner Neil Anthony Gaughan
Australian Federal Police	Commander Richard Charles Moses
New South Wales Police	Superintendent Matthew Gerard Appleton
New South Wales Police	Inspector Edward Charles Billett
New South Wales Police	Senior Sergeant Peter James Davis
New South Wales Police	Detective Sergeant Cynthia Maree Donovan
New South Wales Police	Detective Inspector Wayne George Hayes
New South Wales Police	Senior Constable Justine Louise Housego
New South Wales Police	Superintendent Patrick Allen Paroz
New South Wales Police	Inspector Ross Michael Wilkinson
Victoria Police	Detective Senior Sergeant Mark Robert Caulfield
Victoria Police	Superintendent Paul Stephen Hollowood
Victoria Police	Senior Sergeant Paul Hilary McBride
Victoria Police	Inspector Robert Peter Raaymakers
Victoria Police	Senior Sergeant Jeffrey Francis Smith
Victoria Police	Detective Senior Sergeant Valentine Smith
Victoria Police	Assistant Commissioner Wendy Maree Steendam
Queensland Police	Assistant Commissioner Paul Lawrence Doyle
Queensland Police	Sergeant Geoffrey Allan Fay
Queensland Police	Chief Superintendent Grant Alan Pitman
Queensland Police	Detective Sergeant Daryl Harris Poole
Queensland Police	Superintendent Donna Maree Sturgess
Queensland Police	Inspector Murray Allan Verrall
Western Australia Police	Detective Superintendent Paul Edward Coombes
Western Australia Police	Superintendent Harold Heavens
Western Australia Police	Inspector Joanne Lee McCabe
Western Australia Police	Inspector Neil Lawrence Royle
South Australia Police	Detective Senior Sergeant Michael John Eichner
South Australia Police	Superintendent Peter John Harvey
South Australia Police	Chief Superintendent Linda Williams
Tasmania Police	Sergeant Rodney Harold Carrick
Northern Territory Police	Brevet Sergeant Owen Nathan Auricht

== Australian Fire Service Medal (AFSM) ==
Branch	Recipient
New South Wales Fire Services	Judee Anne Bryant
New South Wales Fire Services	Norman Alfred Carter
New South Wales Fire Services	Jeffrey James Cree
New South Wales Fire Services	Grahame Fothergill
New South Wales Fire Services	Richard Anthony Griffiths
New South Wales Fire Services	David Murray Hoadley
New South Wales Fire Services	Warren Ernest Simmons
New South Wales Fire Services	Herbert Fitzroy Stacy
New South Wales Fire Services	John Leslie Tapper
Victoria Fire Services	William Robert Rodda
Victoria Fire Services	Jeffrey Frederick Ross
Victoria Fire Services	Michael Gilbert Tudball
Victoria Fire Services	Christopher Gerard Watt
Queensland Fire Services	Michael Thomas Garrahy
Queensland Fire Services	Graham Kenneth King
Queensland Fire Services	Stephen Anthony Smith
Western Australia Fire Services	Jeffrey Drage
Western Australia Fire Services	Bruce Sidney Jones
Western Australia Fire Services	Gary Thomas King
Western Australia Fire Services	James Leon McNamara
Western Australia Fire Services	Peter Hugh Thurkle
South Australia Fire Services	Jeffrey Raymond Clark
South Australia Fire Services	Leigh Rodney Miller
Australian Capital Territory Fire Services	Conrad Francis Barr

== Ambulance Service Medal (ASM) ==
Branch	Recipient
New South Wales Ambulance Service	Maxwell Harry Caddis
New South Wales Ambulance Service	Terence Lindsay Nelson
New South Wales Ambulance Service	Maxwell Clinton Stonestreet
Queensland Ambulance Service	Anthony Thomas King
Queensland Ambulance Service	Sydney David Melville APM
South Australia Ambulance Service	Christopher Tilney Cotton
South Australia Ambulance Service	Patricia Ann Kakoschke
Tasmania Ambulance Service	David Savigny Godfrey-Smith
Tasmania Ambulance Service	Dominic Paul Morgan
Tasmania Ambulance Service	Stephen John Trewin
Australian Capital Territory Ambulance Service	David Grahame Sutton

== Emergency Services Medal (ESM) ==
Branch	Recipient
New South Wales Emergency Services	Jennifer Ann North
Victoria Emergency Services	Richard Mark Burgess
Queensland Emergency Services	Francis Edward Devlin
Queensland Emergency Services	George William Phillips OAM RFD ED
Western Australia Emergency Services	Paul Bradley Carr
South Australia Emergency Services	Ross Charles Johnston
South Australia Emergency Services	Paul Douglas Ortmann
Australian Capital Territory Emergency Services	Anthony James Graham

== Medal for Gallantry (MG) ==
Branch	Recipient	Citation
Army	Corporal B—	For acts of gallantry in action in hazardous circumstances on Operation SLIPPER in Afghanistan in 2008.
Army	Lance Corporal Brendan Michael Clarke	For acts of gallantry in action in hazardous circumstances while a rifleman with Team Three, Mentoring Team C, Mentoring Task Force 1, in the Central Baluchi Valley, Afghanistan on 15 March and 8 July 2010.
Army	Warrant Officer Class Two Kevin Bede Dolan	For acts of gallantry in action in hazardous circumstances while a joint terminal attack controller for Mentoring Team A, Mentoring Task Force 1, at Sorkh Lez in the Mirabad Valley, Afghanistan on 2 July 2010.

== Commendation for Gallantry ==
Branch	Recipient	Citation
Army	Private M—	For acts of gallantry in action while on Operation SLIPPER in Afghanistan.
British Army	Corporal L—	For acts of gallantry while on Operation SLIPPER in Afghanistan.

== Meritorious Unit Citation ==
Branch	Recipients	Citation
ADF	1st Mentoring Task Force	For sustained outstanding service in warlike operations on Operation SLIPPER in Uruzgan Province, Afghanistan, between 20 January and 30 January 2010.

== Distinguished Service Cross (DSC) ==
Branch	Recipient	Citation
Army	Major J—	For distinguished command and leadership in action on Operation SLIPPER in Afghanistan.

== Distinguished Service Medal (DSM) ==
Branch	Recipient	Citation
Army	Captain C—	For distinguished leadership in action while on Operation SLIPPER in Afghanistan.
Army	Corporal D—	For distinguished leadership in action in the provision of critical medical care to multiple casualties while on Operation SLIPPER in Afghanistan.
Army	Corporal Russell Stephen Goodsell	For distinguished leadership in action as a section commander with Mentoring Team C, Mentoring Task Force 1, at Karakak in the Baluchi Valley, Afghanistan on 27 March and 29 July 2010.
Army	Major Jason Stuart Groat	For distinguished leadership in action as the Officer Commanding, Mentoring Team A, Mentoring Task Force 1, on Operation SLIPPER in Afghanistan from January to July 2010.
Army	Captain Fabian Ronald Harrison	For distinguished leadership in action as an engineer search team leader and patrol commander while deployed on Operation SLIPPER in Afghanistan from February to October 2010.

== Commendation for Distinguished Service ==
Branch	Recipient	Citation
Army	Captain Khalid El Khaligi	For distinguished performance of duties in warlike operations and in action while Troop Commander, 105th Troop, 40th Regiment, Royal Artillery on Operation HERRICK 10 in Afghanistan in 2009.
Army	Corporal Garry John Francis	For distinguished performance of duties in warlike operations while a medic with Mentoring Team C, Mentoring Task Force 1, in Afghanistan on Operation SLIPPER from January to October 2010.
Army	Sergeant G— DSM	For distinguished performance of duties in warlike operations and in action while on Operation SLIPPER in Afghanistan.
Army	Colonel David John Hay	For distinguished performance of duties in warlike operations while Commanding Officer, Force Communication Unit 3 on Operation SLIPPER in the Middle East Area of Operations 2010.
US Navy	Chief Warrant Officer D—	For distinguished performance of duties in warlike operations and in action while on Operation SLIPPER in Afghanistan in 2010.

== Conspicuous Service Cross (CSC) ==
Branch	Recipient	Citation
Navy	Principal Chaplain Garry Wilson Lock	For outstanding achievement as Principal Chaplain of the Royal Australian Navy.
Navy	Captain Steven Andrew Sparks	For outstanding achievement as the Director Joint Fuels and Lubricants Agency, Defence Materiel Organisation.
Navy	Warrant Officer Raymond Tandy	For outstanding achievement as Warrant Officer of the Navy.
Army	Lieutenant Colonel Anthony Richard Ashley	For outstanding achievement as the Staff Officer Grade One – Chief Legal Adviser, Office of the Chief of Army, Army Headquarters.
Army	Captain Andrew Peter Challen	For outstanding achievement as the Regimental Medical Officer of the 1st Battalion, the Royal Australian Regiment.
Army	Lieutenant Colonel Susan May Coyle	For outstanding achievement as the Commanding Officer of the 17th Signal Regiment.
Army	Brigadier Gregory Francis Downing	For outstanding achievement as Director General Australian Defence Test and Evaluation Office, Capability Development Group.
Army	Colonel J— DSC	For outstanding achievement and application of leadership skills.
Army	Major Terrence Alexander Johnson	For outstanding achievement as the Staff Officer Grade Two Maintenance Standards, Headquarters 16th Aviation Brigade.
Army	Major Brendan Kellaway	For outstanding achievement as the Officer Commanding Australia's Federation Guard.
Army	Brigadier Stephen Adam Kinloch	For outstanding achievement as Director General Munitions, Defence Materiel Organisation.
Army	Brigadier David Thomas Mulhall AM	For outstanding achievement as the Chief of Staff Army Headquarters, Office of the Chief of Army, Army Headquarters.
Army	Colonel Gary Gordon Potter	For outstanding achievement as the Project Director of the Defence Asbestos Inventory Tiger Team in the identification and eradication of asbestos from defence inventory.
Army	Lieutenant Colonel Christopher Robert Smith	For outstanding achievement as Staff Officer One Future Land Operating Concept, Directorate of Future Land Warfare and Strategy, Land Warfare Development Centre, Army Headquarters.
Air Force	Wing Commander Pierre Floribert Blais	For outstanding achievement as Deputy Director Safety and Airworthiness at Headquarters Air Command.
Air Force	Wing Commander Glen Edward Braz	For outstanding achievement as Deputy Director Australian Super Hornet Transition Team and Commanding Officer at Number 1 Squadron.
Air Force	Wing Commander Jeffrey Ronald Frost	For outstanding achievement in the conduct of the first warfighting experimentation of a remotely piloted aircraft and the development of the Woomera Test Range.
Air Force	Corporal Julien Peter Wells	For outstanding achievement as a Technical Training Instructor at Surveillance and Control Training Unit.

== Conspicuous Service Medal (CSM) ==
Branch	Recipient	Citation
Navy	Chief Petty Officer Troy Alexanda Dack	For meritorious achievement in the field of warship sustainment, refit and repair while employed as a Ship Agent in the ANZAC Systems Program Office.
Navy	Chief Petty Officer Arthur Charles Mitcherson	For meritorious achievement in the field of technical support to the Defence Materiel Organisation and the Royal Australian Navy.
Navy	Chief Petty Officer Joanne Monaghan	For meritorious devotion to duty in the promotion of the principles of Equity and Diversity, and in the field of sexual offence support at HMAS Cerberus.
Navy	Leading Seaman Rebekah Lee Roediger	For meritorious devotion to duty as the senior communications sailor in Patrol Boat Crew ATTACK FOUR from January 2008 to October 2010.
Navy	Lieutenant Commander Jonathan Tha	For meritorious achievement in the Australian Submarine Force.
Navy	Chief Petty Officer Nigel Mark Williams	For meritorious devotion to duty as the Boarding Officer of patrol boat crew ARDENT FOUR from June 2009 until July 2010.
Army	Warrant Officer Class Two Vivian Roy Anderson	For meritorious achievement as the Acting Officer-in-Charge of the Oakey Detachment of Joint Logistics Unit (South Queensland).
Army	Corporal Benjamin James Balchin	For meritorious achievement in a non-warlike situation while performing ground liaison support duties on Operation KOKODA ASSIST in August 2009.
Army	Warrant Officer Class Two Tyrone Kevin Cantwell	For meritorious achievement as the Telecommunications Systems Manager, Defence Communications Area Master Station Australia.
Army	Warrant Officer Class One Gary John Hughes	For meritorious devotion to duty as a warrant officer.
Army	Major J— DSM	For meritorious achievement in command and instructional duties.
Army	Corporal Shaun Justin Love	For meritorious achievement as a member of the Directing Staff at the Australian Command and Staff College and as a mentor of future strategic level leaders.
Army	Major Neill Stewart Morris	For meritorious achievement as a Training Officer of Training Company and water operations subject matter expert, 51st Battalion, Far North Queensland Regiment.
Army	Sergeant P—	For meritorious achievement as the Second-in-Command, Field Security Team, Joint Task Force 631, on Operation ASTUTE in East Timor in 2010.
Army	Major Graham Trevor Palmer	For meritorious devotion to duty as the Unit Welfare Officer of the 6th Battalion, the Royal Australian Regiment in support of Mentoring Task Force 1 while the Force was deployed on Operation SLIPPER in 2010.
Army	Warrant Officer Class Two Andrew Peter Shore	For meritorious achievement as the Officer Commanding Training Wing, Parachute Training School.
Army	Warrant Officer Class One Carol Ann Ward	For meritorious achievement as the Staff Officer Grade Three Personnel, Headquarters New South Wales Australian Army Cadets Brigade.
Air Force	Flight Sergeant Paul Leslie Hardiker	For meritorious achievement as the Unit Training Coordinator and Maintenance Coordinator at Number 36 Squadron.
Air Force	Corporal David Leslie Janik	For meritorious achievement as the Research Assistant within the Military Claims Liaison Office.
Air Force	Squadron Leader David Ian Scherr	For meritorious achievement as the Training Officer at Headquarters Health Services Wing and Health Operational Conversion Unit in support of clinical and operational education and training.
Air Force	Flight Sergeant David William Sowden	For meritorious achievement as the Bonded Structures Technology Team Certification Officer for Bonded Structural Repair in the Australian Defence Organisation.
Air Force	Wing Commander Ross Colin Wadsworth	For meritorious achievement as Commander Joint Task Force 636 on Operation PAKISTAN ASSIST II in 2010.
