= Hamartoma =

Tumour-like overgrowth due to a systemic genetic condition

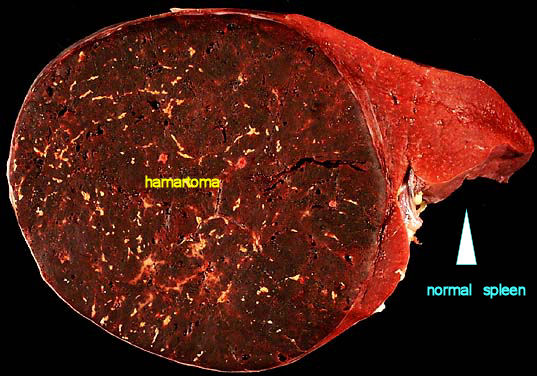
- A large hamartoma of the spleen. The hamartoma is the dark circular object on the left that dominates the image. This is a cross-section; the growth is about 9 cm in diameter, while the entire spleen is about 11 cm in diameter.
- Pronunciation: /ˌhæmɑːrˈtoʊmə/
- Specialty: Medical genetics, pathology
- Diagnostic method: Chest x-ray, CT scan, MRI, ultrasound, and bronchoscopy.

A hamartoma is a mostly benign, local malformation of cells that resembles a neoplasm of local tissue but is usually due to an overgrowth of multiple aberrant cells, with a basis in a systemic genetic condition, rather than a growth descended from a single mutated cell (monoclonality), as would typically define a benign neoplasm/tumor. Despite this, many hamartomas are found to have clonal chromosomal aberrations that are acquired through somatic mutations, and on this basis the term hamartoma is sometimes considered synonymous with neoplasm. Hamartomas are by definition benign, slow-growing or self-limiting, though the underlying condition may still predispose the individual towards malignancies.

Hamartomas are usually caused by a genetic syndrome that affects the development cycle of all or at least multiple cells. Many of these conditions are classified as overgrowth syndromes or cancer syndromes. Hamartomas occur in many different parts of the body and are most often asymptomatic incidentalomas (undetected until they are found incidentally on an imaging study obtained for another reason). Additionally, the definition of hamartoma versus benign neoplasm is often unclear, since both lesions can be clonal. Lesions such as adenomas, developmental cysts, hemangiomas, lymphangiomas and rhabdomyomas within the kidneys, lungs or pancreas are interpreted by some experts as hamartomas while others consider them true neoplasms. Moreover, even though hamartomas show a benign histology, there is a risk of some rare but life-threatening complications such as those found in neurofibromatosis type I and tuberous sclerosis.

It is different from choristoma, a closely related form of heterotopia. The two can be differentiated as follows: a hamartoma is an excess of normal tissue in a normal situation (e.g., a birthmark on the skin), while a choristoma is an excess of tissue in an abnormal situation (e.g., pancreatic tissue in the duodenum). The term hamartoma is from the Greek ἁμαρτία, hamartia ("error"), and was introduced by Eugen Albrecht in 1904.

== Causes ==
Hamartomas are caused by abnormal formation in normal tissue and can occur spontaneously or as a result of an underlying disorder. Hamartomas are most likely the result of developmental error and can manifest itself in multiple locations. The development of hamartomas has also been linked to certain genes such as SMAD4, PTEN, STK1, and BMPR1A.

Disorders associated with hamartomas include tuberous sclerosis, cowden syndrome, PTEN hamartoma tumour syndrome, and Peutz–Jeghers syndrome.

== Diagnosis ==
=== Classification ===
==== Lung ====
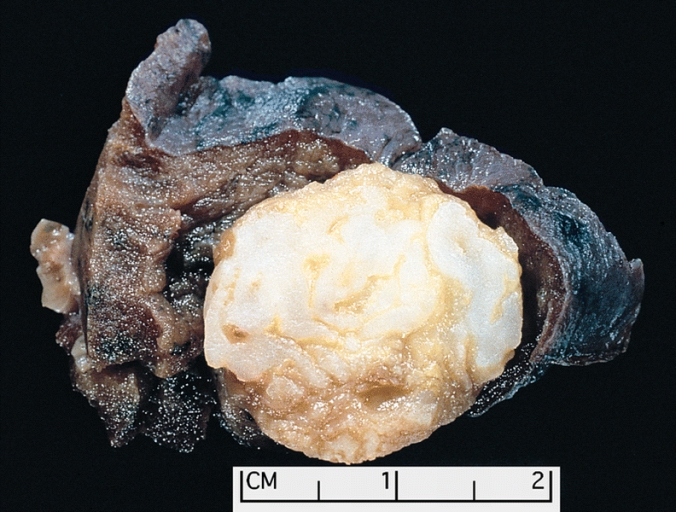
Parenchymal hamartoma of the lung. The surrounding lung falls away from the well-circumscribed mass, a typical feature of these lesions. The hamartoma shows a variegated yellow and white appearance, which corresponds respectively to fat and cartilage.

About 5–8% of all solitary lung nodules and about 75% of all benign lung tumors, are hamartomas. Ten percent of hamartomas are endobronchial lesions, with the majority occurring in the peripheral lung parenchyma. Peripheral pulmonary hamartomas typically do not cause any symptoms. Patients may experience hemoptysis, obstructive pneumonia, dyspnea, persistent cough, and chest pain, depending on the size and location. Typically, lung hamartomas appear as solitary nodules on thoracic computed tomography (CT) scans, with a diameter of less than 4 cm.

Lung hamartomas are more common in men than in women, and may present additional difficulties in smokers.

==== Heart ====
Cardiac rhabdomyomas is an uncommon, benign mesenchymal tumor that originated from striated muscle. Usually, it affects the head and neck. It has been found that tuberous sclerosis is linked to 80–90% of cardiac rhabdomyomas. The symptoms may manifest as pericardial effusion, hydrops fetalis, or heart blocks.

==== Nerves ====
Sometimes nerves can also be affected. The most common nerve to be affected by hamartoma is reported to be median nerve.

==== Hypothalamus ====
One of the most troublesome hamartomas occurs on the hypothalamus. Unlike most such growths, a hypothalamic hamartoma is symptomatic; it most often causes gelastic seizures, and can cause visual problems, other seizures, rage disorders associated with hypothalamic diseases, and early onset of puberty. The symptoms typically begin in early infancy and are progressive, often into general cognitive and/or functional disability. Moreover, resection is usually difficult, as the growths are generally adjacent to, or even intertwined with, the optic nerve. Symptoms tend to be resistant to medical control; however, surgical techniques are improving and can result in immense improvement of prognosis.

==== Kidneys, stomach, spleen and other vascular organs ====
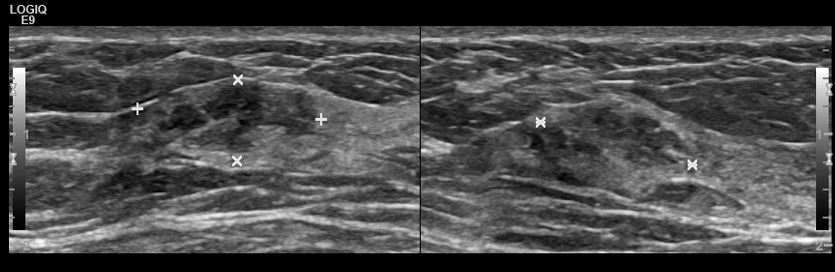
Hamartoma in breast with ultrasound

Renal hamartomas are benign tumors that most likely developed from birth defects in the organ. They are frequently abundant in blood vessels and contain varying amounts of fat and smooth muscle components.

A myoepithelial hamartoma, also known as a pancreatic rest, is ectopic pancreatic tissue found in the stomach, duodenum, or proximal jejunum. When seen on upper gastrointestinal series, a pancreatic rest may appear to be a submucosal mass or gastric neoplasm. Most are asymptomatic, but they can cause dyspepsia or upper gastrointestinal bleeding.

A hamartoma has been identified as a cause of partial outflow obstruction in the abomasum (true gastric stomach) of a dairy goat.

Splenic hamartoma is an uncommon benign vascular proliferative tumor that is identified by the vascular endothelial lining cells' CD8 immunopositivity. It is made up of an unusual combination of typical splenic components, like red and white pulp.

==== Cowden syndrome ====
Cowden syndrome is an uncommon hereditary disorder marked by numerous hamartomas in a range of tissues from all three layers of the embryo. This is a syndrome that predisposes people to cancer and increases the risk of developing cancer in many different tissues, but particularly in the endometrium, thyroid, and breast. It is inherited autosomally dominantly, with a germ-line mutation of the PTEN tumor suppressor gene present in about 80% of patients.

== Prognosis ==
Hamartomas, while generally benign, can cause problems due to their location. For example, when located on the skin, especially on the face or neck, they can be very disfiguring. Cases have been reported of hamartomas the size of a small orange. They may obstruct practically any organ in the body, such as the colon, eye, etc. They are particularly likely to cause major health issues when located in the hypothalamus, kidneys, lips, or spleen. They can be removed surgically if necessary, and are not likely to recur. Prognosis will depend upon the location and size of the lesion, as well as the overall health of the patient.

== See also ==
- Hamartia (medical term)
- List of cutaneous conditions
