= Hamartia (disambiguation) =

Hamartia is a classical Greek term.

Hamartia may also refer to:

- Hamartia (album)
- Hamartia (medical term)
- Hamartia (moth)
