= The Yipping Tiger =

2009 book by Perminder Sachdev

The Yipping Tiger and Other Tales from the Neuropsychiatric Clinic
- Author: Perminder Sachdev
- Subject: Neuropsychiatry
- Publisher: UNSW Press (Australia); Johns Hopkins University Press (US)
- Publication date: 2009
- Pages: 288
- ISBN: 1-74223-084-9

The Yipping Tiger and Other Tales from the Neuropsychiatric Clinic is a book by neuropsychiatrist Perminder Sachdev, M.D. consisting of ten case studies which explore the relationship between the brain and the mind. The case studies are based on Sachdev's experience in the neuropsychiatric clinic at the Neuropsychiatric Institute, Sydney, Australia. Each case study examines a different medical condition, the current research findings related to the condition, and the challenges these conditions pose for the doctor and patient.

== Contents ==
- The Yipping Tiger (Golfer's cramps)
- Shaking hands with Dr Strangelove (The Alien hand syndrome)
- Swearing like a Spanish sailor (Coprolalia in Tourette's syndrome)
- The Mozart Complex (Brain enhancement)
- The mirror always lies (Anorexia nervosa)
- The dead homunculus (Frontal lobe disorder)
- Serotonin's seductive song (Major depressive disorder)
- A chesty problem (Obsessive-compulsive disorder)
- Lord Nelson's ghost (Phantom limb)
- Freudian slips and semantic slides (Mild cognitive impairment)

== Reception ==
- Boucher, G. (August 8, 2009). "Off-putting tales from a yipping yarn". The Australian. Archived from the original on March 3, 2016.
- J. Horder, ‘Medicine: IN BRIEF’. The Times Literary Supplement 2010 (23 July), page 27:
- S. Hussein, ‘Brains, Minds, Hearts and Souls’. New Matilda 2010 (20 May): https://web.archive.org/web/20110823213551/http://newmatilda.com/2010/05/20/brains-minds-hearts-souls
- K. Ridel, ‘Book Review: The Hidden Brain and The Yipping Tiger and Other Tales from the Neuropsychiatric Clinic’. Neurology 2011; 76:e77.
- Turney, D. (April 1, 2010). "Think again: reinterpreting the brain". The Sydney Morning Herald. p. 19.
- ‘All in the mind: On the couch: Perminder Sachdev and Norman Doidge’, radio interview presented by Natasha Mitchell, ABC Radio National 2010 (25 September): http://www.abc.net.au/rn/allinthemind/stories/2010/3016990.htm
- ‘All in the mind: Q & A - the audience asks. Norman Doidge and Perminder Sachdev’, radio interview presented by Natasha Mitchell, ABC Radio National 2010 (4 October):
