= Gelastic seizure =

Type of seizure

A gelastic seizure, also known as "gelastic epilepsy", is a rare type of seizure that involves a sudden burst of energy, usually in the form of laughing. This syndrome usually occurs for no obvious reason and is uncontrollable. It is slightly more common in males than females.

This syndrome can go for very long periods of time without a diagnosis, as it may resemble normal laughing or crying if it occurs infrequently. It has been associated with several conditions, such as temporal and frontal lobe lesions, tumors, atrophy, tuberous sclerosis, hemangiomas, and post-infectious foci, but mainly hypothalamic hamartomas.

The term "gelastic" originates from the Greek word gelos, which means laughter.

== Signs and symptoms ==
The main sign of a gelastic seizure is a sudden outburst of laughter with no apparent cause. The laughter may sound unpleasant and sardonic rather than joyful. The outburst usually lasts for less than a minute. During or shortly after a seizure, an individual might display some twitching, strange eye movements, lip smacking, fidgeting or mumbling. If a person who has the seizures is hooked up to an electroencephalogram, it will reveal interictal epileptic discharges. This syndrome usually manifests itself before the individual reaches the age of three or four. The temporal lobes and the hypothalamus are the areas of the brain with the most involvement with these seizures. This may cause learning disabilities, and faulted cognitive function as well. It is not uncommon for children to have tonic–clonic seizures, and atonic seizures directly following the seizure. Those that are associated with hypothalamic hamartomas may occur as often as several times hourly and typically begin during infancy. Seizures that occur in infancy may include bursts of cooing, respirations, giggling, and smiling. Due to early hypothalamic–pituitary–gonadal axis activation in girls who have the seizures, it is not uncommon for them to display secondary sex characteristics before the age of eight.

== Causes ==
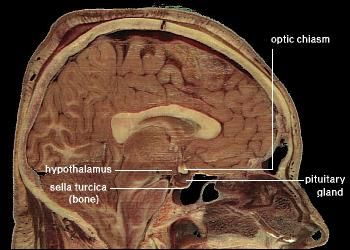
Tuber cinereum hamartomas (also known as hypothalamic hemartoma) are at the hypothalamus between the mamillary bodies.

A gelastic seizure is classically associated with a hypothalamic hamartoma (a type of brain tumor). A hypothalamic hamartoma is defined as a benign mass of glial tissue on or near the hypothalamus. The size of the hamartoma can vary from one centimeter to larger than three centimeters. They can cause several different classes of seizure including the gelastic type. These structures can be detected with different imaging modalities such as computed tomography, magnetic resonance imaging, single-photon emission computed tomography (SPECT) and positron emission tomography (PET-CT). A computed tomography scan of an individual with a hypothalamic hamartoma would reveal a suprasellar mass with the same density as brain tissue. Images of these masses are not enhanced with the use of contrast. However, although a computed tomography scan may be useful in diagnosing the cause of a seizure, in the case of a hypothalamic hamartoma, magnetic resonance imaging is the tool of choice due to the cerebrospinal fluid which defines these masses. SPECT may also be used which involves the use of a radiotracer that is taken up by the ictal region of the brain where the tumor typically lies. PET-CT using F-18 fluorodeoxyglucose (FDG) show reduced metabolism at the site of seizure onset. Gelastic seizures have been observed after taking a birth control pill (Maxim (R)).

Optic nerve hypoplasia is the only reported condition associated with gelastic seizures without the presence of hypothalamic hamartoma, suggesting that hypothalamic disorganization alone can cause gelastic seizures.

== History ==
Very likely gelastic seizures were already recognized at the time of Babylonian medicine. A detailed description was given by the Scottish physician Robert Whytt in 1765, and the term "gelastic seizure" was coined in 1898 by the French neurologist, neuropathologist and epileptologist Charles Féré.

== Notable cases ==
- George William Helon (Australian author and businessman) is a gelastic seizure patient, mentor, counsellor and advocate.

== Media references ==
Gelastic syncope was also referred to in one paper also as "Seinfeld syncope" after an incident in which a patient repeatedly fainted while watching an episode of Seinfeld.Two Grey's Anatomy episodes in the show's sixteenth season featured a child with gelastic seizures caused by a brain tumor.
