= Perminder Sachdev =

Indian neuropsychiatrist based in Australia

Perminder Sachdev AM FAHMS
- Born: 1956 (age 69–70); Ludhiana, Punjab, India
- Education: All India Institutes of Medical Sciences, University of New South Wales
- Scientific career
- Fields: Neuropsychiatry
- Workplaces: University of New South Wales

Perminder Sachdev (born 1956, Ludhiana, India) is an Indian neuropsychiatrist based in Australia. He is a professor of neuropsychiatry at the University of New South Wales (UNSW), co-director of the UNSW Centre for Healthy Brain Aging, and clinical director of the Neuropsychiatric Institute at the Prince of Wales Hospital, Sydney. He is considered a trailblazer in the field of neuropsychiatry. Sachdev's research interests include ageing, vascular cognitive disorders such as vascular dementia, and psychiatric disorders.

== Early life and education ==
Sachdev was born in Ludhiana, Punjab, India and went to school in Solan in the foothills of the Himalayas. He attended All India Institutes of Medical Sciences, earning his MBBS in 1978 and his MD in psychiatry in 1981. The title of his thesis was "A reperatory grid comparison of endogeneous and neurotic depressions." He received his PhD in psychiatry from University of New South Wales in 1991 after successfully defending his dissertation, "Studies in Māori ethnopsychiatry," which looked at the Māori traditions of mana, tapu, noa, and whakamā. He chose to study psychiatry instead of neurology because it "offered the scope for examining 'the human condition'."

== Career ==
Sachdev has been the clinical director of the Neuropsychiatric Institute at the Prince of Wales Hospital, Sydney since 1987. Research there focuses on movement disorders such as drug-induced akathisia, Tourette Syndrome, tardive dystonia, and neuroleptic malignant syndrome. He became a professor of neuropsychiatry at the University of New South Wales (UNSW) in 1999. Sachdev's research interests center on cognitive and psychiatric disorders; examples include late-onset schizophrenia, dementia, and Alzheimer's. He has done research on how mirror neurons impact psychiatric disorders, and has examined the efficacy of brain stimulation techniques such as TMS, DCS, VNS, and DBS as treatments for psychiatric disorders.

In 2006, he became the founding chair of the neuropsychiatry section at the Royal Australian and New Zealand College of Psychiatrists, a position he held for one year. In 2012, he established the Centre for Healthy Brain Ageing at UNSW, which focuses on neurocognitive disorders and brain health, specifically regarding vascular dementia. This team includes researchers from eight universities and three research institutions. He has been the PI on a number of longitudinal, community-based studies of brain ageing, including the Sydney Memory and Ageing Study, the Older Australian Twins Study, and the Sydney Centenarian Study (1997-2005). The Sydney Centenarian Study "emphasised the important role of the brain's frontoparietal network in relation to the adaptability of a person's cognitive abilities to ageing and disease, known as cognitive reserve." He is a collaborator of the Australian PATH Through Life Study, leading the normative brain ageing study since its start. He also leads three international networks: the International Centenarian Consortium - Dementia (ICC-Dementia), which began in 2012; the Cohort Studies of Memory in an International Consortium (COSMIC), which began in 2017; and the Stroke and Cognititon Consortium (STROKOG), which began expanding in 2022.

His involvement in so many research collectives has allowed him to take a leading role in the development and improvement of training within neuropsychiatry, including the core curriculum. He was one of two Australians who contributed to the diagnosis of dementia for the DSM-5 and led an international team to develop the diagnosis for dementia for the International Society of Vascular Behavioural and Cognitive Disorders. Sachdev has identified new genetic markers of VCD and Alzheimer's, and has identified homocysteine and impaired fasting glucose as risk factors for brain atrophy. He has also contributed to the field of epilepsy research as a member of the Task Force of the International League Against Epilepsy's Neuropsychobiology Commission. He was invited by the World Health Organization to lead a research blueprint to "help make dementia research an international priority" and, in 2022, the Australian National Health and Medicine Research Council provided him with funding to establish a research center focused solely on vascular contributions to dementia. According to former UNSW Vice-Chancellor Ian Jacobs, who nominated Sachdev for the Ryman Award, he has also "championed the inclusion of diversity in dementia research."

Additionally, he was a medical advisor and founding executive committee member of the Tourette Syndrome Association starting in 1989; was on the Scientific Steering Committee of the Garvan Institute's Neuroscience Institute of Schizophrenia and Allied Disorders (1996-1998); sat on the Royal Australian and New Zealand College of Psychiatrists' Committee on Psychotropic Drugs and Other Physical Treatments (1996-1998); was a founding member (1998), president (2004-2006), executive member (2011), assistant secretary, and treasurer of the International Neuropsychiatric Association; and served as vice-president of the Indo-Australasian Psychiatry Association (2005-2006).

He was also a founding member and past president of the International College of Geriatric Psychopharmacology and formerly chief medical advisor to Alzheimer's Australia. He served as an international advisor to the American Neurosurgical Society's Psychosurgery Review Committee, was an advisory member of the F1000 reports board, and has sat on the editorial board of a number of journals, including the American Journal of Geriatric Psychiatry, Neuropsychiatric Disease and Treatment, Acta Neuropsychiatrica, and Current Opinion in Psychiatry. Additionally, he is a member of the Australian Society of Psychiatric Research, Australian Society of Biological Psychiatry, Alzheimer's Association, Australian Brain Foundation, the task force of the International League Against Epilepsy's Neuropsychobiology Commission, and American Psychiatric Association's Neurocognitive Disorders Work Group.

== Honours and awards ==
- 1985: Fellow, Royal Australian and New Zealand College of Psychiatrists.
- 1995: Organon Senior Research Award, Royal Australian and New Zealand College of Psychiatrists.
- 2004: Outstanding Academician Award, Indo-Australian Psychiatric Association.
- 2009: Australian Rotary Health Dissemination Award, Australasian Society of Psychiatric Research.
- 2010: NSW Scientist of the Year in Biomedical Sciences.
- 2011: Fellow, National Health and Medical Research Council's Academy.
- 2011: Founder's Medal, Australian Society for Psychiatric Research.
- 2011: Member, Order of Australia at the Queen's Birthday Honours for his clinical and academic research in neuropsychiatry.
- 2012: International Distinguished Fellow, American Psychiatric Association.
- 2014: Dean's Award for outstanding contribution to research and teaching, UNSW Medicine.
- 2015 - Fellow, Australian Academy of Health and Medical Sciences.
- 2019: Top Researcher in Geontology and Geriatric Medicine, The Australian.
- 2022: Top Researcher in Neurobiology, The Australian.
- 2022 - Ryman Prize "for his unique contribution to the understanding of ageing" and prevention and early diagnosis of dementia.

== Personal life ==
Sachdev is married to psychiatrist Dr. Jagdeep Sachdev.

== Selected publications ==
As of 2022, Sachdev had more than 1,100 peer reviewed journal articles, seven books (including The Yipping Tiger), three edited books, and 71 book chapters to his name. He has published in journals including Nature, Science, Molecular Psychiatry, Lancet Neurology, and the British Medical Journal. In 2017, he published a book of poems called A migrant's musings and other offerings to an adopted land.

- 1983: "A repertory grid comparison of endogenous and neurotic depressions." With H.M. Chawla et al. Indian Journal of Psychiatry, 25: 46-51.
- 1994: "Research diagnostic criteria for drug-induced akathisia: conceptualisation, rationale, and proposal." Psychopharmacology, 114: 181-186. doi:10.1007/BF02245462
- 1995: "Does neurosurgery for obsessive-compulsive disorder produce personality change?" with P. Hay. Journal of Nervous and Mental Disease, 183: 408-413. doi:10.1097/00005053-199506000-00010
- 1998: "Evidence-based medicine offers little support for psychosurgery." With R.T. White. Australian and New Zealand Journal of Psychiatry, 32: 460-462.
- 2001: "Schizophrenia-like psychosis following traumatic brain injury: a chart-based descriptive and case-control study." With J.S. Smith and S. Cathcart. Journal of Neuropsychiatry and Clinical Neurosciences, 13: 533-534. doi:10.1176/appi.neuropsych.13.4.533
- 2005: "MRI hyperintensities and depressive symptoms in a community sample of 60- to 64-year-olds." With A.F. Jorm et al. American Journal of Psychiatry, 162: 699-704. doi:10.1176/appi.ajp.162.4.699
- 2008: "Hippocampal volume is positively associated with behavioural inhibition (BIS) in a large community-based sample of mid-life adults: the PATH through life study." With N. Cherbuin et al. Social Cognitive and Affective Neuroscience, 3: 262-269. doi:10.1093/scan/nsn018
- 2009: "White matter hyperintensities in the forties: Their prevalence and topography in an epidemiological sample aged 44–48." With W. Wen et al. NeuroImage, 47: S80. doi:10.1016/s1053-8119(09)70557-9
- 2011: "Impact of Load-Related Neural Processes on Feature Binding in Visuospatial Working Memory." With N.A. Kochan et al. PLoS ONE, 6: e23960. doi:10.1371/journal.pone.0023960
- 2014: "Increase in PAS-induced neuroplasticity after a treatment courseof transcranial direct current stimulation for depression." With M.J. Player et al. Journal of Affective Disorders, 167: 140-147. doi:10.1016/j.jad.2014.05.063
- 2017: "Incidental findings on cerebral MRI in twins: the Older Australian Twins Study." With R. Koncz et al. Brain Imaging and Behavior, 12: 860-869. doi:10.1007/s11682-017-9747-2
- 2018: "Non-Genetic Risk Factors for Degenerative and Vascular Young Onset Dementia: Results from the INSPIRED and KGOW Studies." With M. Cations et al. Journal of Alzheimer's Disease, 62: 1747-1758. doi:10.3233/jad-171027
- 2019: "The Plasma NAD⁺ Metabolome Is Dysregulated in "normal" Aging." With J. Clement et al. Rejuvenation Research, 22: 121-130. doi:10.1089/rej.2018.2077
- 2022: "Social health, social reserve and dementia." Current Opinion in Psychiatry, 35(2): 111-117. doi:10.1097/YCO.0000000000000779
- 2023: "Ensemble feature selection with data-driven thresholding for Alzheimer's disease biomarker discovery." With A. Spooner et al. BMC Bioinformatics, 24(9). doi:10.1186/s12859-022-05132-9
