= Sue Richardson (economist) =

Australian economist and labour market researcher (born 1946)

Sue Richardson AM FASSA
- Born: 1946 (age 79–80); Melbourne, Victoria, Australia

Academic background
- Education: La Trobe University; University of Melbourne
- Thesis: An economic model of government choice and its application to problems of federalism (1976)

Academic work
- Institutions: La Trobe University; University of Adelaide; Flinders University

Sue Richardson AM FASSA (born 1946) is an Australian economist and academic. She has been a Matthew Flinders Distinguished Professor at Flinders University since 2012.

== Early life and education ==
Richardson was born in Melbourne, Victoria in 1946. After completing her secondary education at St Catherine's School in Toorak, she took a BCom at the University of Melbourne in 1968. In 1976 she received a PhD from La Trobe University for her thesis "An economic model of government choice and its application to problems of federalism".

== Career ==
Richardson's academic career began as economics tutor at La Trobe University. Following completion of her PhD, she was employed by the University of Adelaide as a lecturer and was promoted to reader in 1991. She transferred to Flinders University in 2000 as professor of labour economics and has been a principal research fellow since 2008. In 2012 Richardson was one of the 14 academics to be awarded the title Matthew Flinders Distinguished Professor by Flinders University.

Richardson was appointed a part-time member of the Minimum Wage Panel of Fair Work Australia (later the Fair Work Commission) in November 2009. In 2018 the commission published her "Discussion paper: The UK evaluation of the impacts of increases in their minimum wage" as part of its annual minimum wage review.

Richardson was elected a Fellow of the Academy of the Social Sciences in Australia in 1994. She served as president of that Academy from 2003 to 2006.

She was made a Member of the Order of Australia in the 2011 Queen's Birthday Honours for "service to the social sciences, particularly in the field of labour market economics as an academic and researcher, and through contributions to the development of socially inclusive public policy".

== Selected works ==
- Travers, Peter; Richardson, Sue (1993), Living decently: Material well-being in Australia, Oxford University Press, ISBN 978-0-19-553360-6
- Richardson, Sue, ed. (1999), Reshaping the labour market: Regulation, efficiency, and equality in Australia, Cambridge University Press, ISBN 978-0-521-65424-1
- Richardson, Sue; Prior, Margot R, eds. (2005), No time to lose: The wellbeing of Australia's children, Melbourne University Publishing, ISBN 978-0-522-85223-3
- Stanley, Fiona; Richardson, Sue; Prior, Margot (2007), Children of the lucky country? How Australian society has turned its back on children and why children matter, Macmillan Australia, ISBN 978-1-74262-401-3
