= Shane Simpson (lawyer) =

New Zealand-born lawyer based in Sydney, Australia

Shane Simpson AM is a New Zealand-born lawyer based in Sydney, Australia. He has had a leading role in arts, intellectual property, and entertainment law in Australia, including establishing the Arts Law Centre of Australia, authoring books on aspects of intellectual property, arts, and entertainment law, and acting as an advisor and producing reports on intellectual property and art law for government. He has also contributed to a range of cultural organisations.

== Education ==
Simpson received his Bachelor of Laws (Honours) in 1973 from the University of Auckland. In 1975 he was awarded a Master of Jurisprudence from the same institution.

== Career ==
Simpson was admitted as a Barrister of the High Court of New Zealand in 1973. Shortly after, he emigrated to Australia, where he taught in the Faculty of Law at the University of New South Wales from 1974 to 1980 (full-time) and 1981-1982 (part-time).

In 1976 he was admitted as a Barrister and Solicitor of the Supreme Court of Victoria, in 1978 as a Barrister of the Supreme Court of New South Wales, and 1986 as a Solicitor of the Supreme Court of New South Wales.

In 1980, a conversation with an artist made him aware that most people working in the Arts didn’t have access to expert legal advice: few artists could afford it and few lawyers were experts in the field. With the assistance of a grant from the Australia Council for the Arts, he travelled in the USA and the UK to research a book on visual artists and the law.

From this research came the idea of establishing a legal centre that would be educated those working in the Arts as to their legal rights, educate lawyers on the legal issues facing arts practitioners, and provide pro bono legal advice for the Arts.

It took two years to secure the funding and establish the Arts Law Centre of Australia. He was its first director (1983-1986) and the first President of its board was Justice Michael Kirby AC CMG. He led the institution through its initial 3 years before stepping down in 1986 to start his own practice, Simpsons Solicitors. It was one of the first legal practices in Australia to specialise solely in arts, entertainment and intellectual property law.

Simpson has served on the boards of numerous cultural organisations, including the National Library of Australia, New Zealand Film Commission, Australian National Maritime Museum, the Music Council of Australia, National Association of the Visual Arts, Australian National Academy of Music, Crafts Council of Australia, and chaired the boards of the Bundanon Trust, Sydney Youth Orchestras, New South Wales Film and Television Office, Aboriginal Benefits Foundation, Studio A, the National Aboriginal Islander Development Association Foundation, the Peggy Glanville Hicks Composers' House Trust, Museums and Galleries Foundation (now Museums and Galleries NSW) among many others.

He was also the founder of the Prelude Project, the cultural re-use of historic properties as composer residences.

== Patron ==
He is the Patron of Ensemble Offspring, the William Fletcher Foundation, the Peggy Glanville Hicks Composers House Trust, and the Arts Law Centre of Australia

== Awards and honours ==
In 2011, Simpson was made a Member of the Order of Australia (AM) for his service to the law and to the arts through leading roles in intellectual property and entertainment law, and as a contributor to a range of cultural organisations.

In 2019 Simpson was awarded a Doctor of the University (Hon. Causa) by the University of New South Wales, "in recognition of his service to the community, both for his role as one of Australia's most highly regarded intellectual property and entertainment industry lawyers who has written and lectured extensively, and for his work in giving young people the opportunity to complete an education and fostering a society that values the creative contribution of the arts guided by values of excellence, integrity, empowerment and accessibility".

== Writings ==
Simpson has written extensively on the legal issues relating to art, music and cultural property. Most recently he wrote "Borders of Culture", an independent review for the Australian Government on the protection of movable cultural heritage in Australia. Major publications include:

- The Visual Artist and the Law (1st edition)
- The Visual Artist and the Law (2nd edition)
- Discovery and Interrogatories, with Bailey & Evans (1st Edition)
- Discovery and Interrogatories, with Bailey & Evans (2nd edition)
- Music - The Business and the Law - edited by Shane Simpson and Greg Stevens
- Museums and Galleries: a practical legal guide
- Review of Australian Copyright Collecting Societies : a report to the Minister for Communications and the Arts and the Minister for Justice, Dept. of Communications and the Arts
- Music Business (1st edition) - with Colin Seeger
- Music Business (2nd edition)
- Music Business (3rd edition)
- Music Business (4th edition) - with Jules Munro
- Review of the Protection of Movable Cultural Heritage Act 1986 : position paper
- Borders of Culture: Review of the Protection of Movable Cultural Heritage Act 1986
- Collections Law & Ethics: Galleries, Libraries, Archives & Museums - with Ian McDonald
