= Maree Gleeson =

Australian immunologist

Maree Gleeson OAM FRSN
- Education: University of Newcastle; University of Sydney
- Occupation: Immunologist

Maree Gleeson is an Australian immunologist. Her research has focused on respiratory immunology in children and elite athletes. She has held multiple leadership positions within the health sector in the Hunter Valley in New South Wales.

== Education ==
Gleeson completed a Bachelor Science (Biochemistry) at the University of Sydney and a PhD (Pathology) at the University of Newcastle.

== Career ==
Gleeson has had a forty-year research career, predominantly undertaken as a Conjoint Professor of the University of Newcastle. Her research has focused on mucosal immunity in children and the impacts of respiratory illness on predisposition to allergies and asthma, as well as for sudden infant death syndrome. Working with the Australian Institute of Sport, she has also studied the control and causes of respiratory illness in elite athletes. Gleeson later collaborated with the Australian Antarctic Division to investigate the effect of expeditions in Antarctica and the effects on immunity.

Gleeson has held multiple leadership positions in health policy, health services, medical research and academia. In 2002, after three decades working in diagnostic immunology services, she became the Director of Immunology for the Hunter Area Pathology Service. In 2004, she became the Inaugural Director of Medical Research in the New South Wales Ministry for Science and Medical Research. From 2006 to 2011, Gleeson was Director of the Hunter Medical Research Institute, which is a joint venture between Hunter New England Health and the University of Newcastle. Upon her departure from this role, the University of Newcastle Council conferred upon Gleeson the status of emeritus Professor.

Gleeson has also sat as a non-executive director on multiple boards: Hunter Water, Central Coast Local Health District, Hunter Valley Research Foundation, and New South Wales Health Pathology.

== Awards, honours, and recognition ==
- 2016 Fellow of the Royal Society of New South Wales
- 2011 Medal of the Order of Australia
- 2011 Hunter Business Chamber's Businessperson of the Year Award
- 2002 Immunology and Cell Biology publication of the year for 2001
