= Hamartia (medical term) =

Disorganized arrangement of tissue types

A hamartia is a focal malformation consisting of disorganized arrangement of tissue types that are normally present in the anatomical area. A hamartia is not considered to be a tumor, and is distinct from a hamartoma, which describes a benign neoplasm characterized by tissue misarrangement similar to a hamartia (i.e., tissue types that are typical of the area but arranged in an atypical manner).
