= Tuber cinereum =

Anatomical structure in the brain

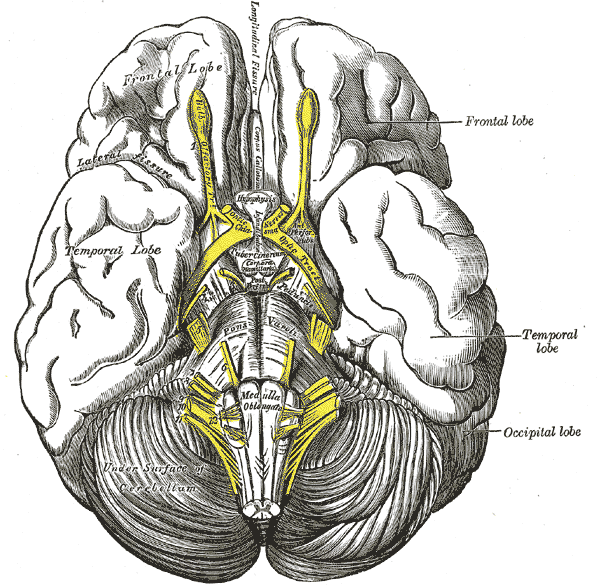
- Base of brain (Tuber cinereum visible at center).

Details

Identifiers
- Latin: tuber cinereum
- MeSH: D014371
- NeuroNames: 1782
- NeuroLex ID: birnlex_1189
- TA98: A14.1.08.408
- TA2: 5673
- FMA: 62327

The tuber cinereum is the portion of hypothalamus forming the floor of the third ventricle situated between the optic chiasm, and the mammillary bodies. The tuberal region is one of the three regions of the hypothalamus, the other two being the chiasmatic region and the mamillary region.

== Structure ==
The tuber cinereum is a convex mass of grey matter, a ventral/inferior distention of the hypothalamus forming the floor of the third ventricle. The portion of the tuber cinereum at the base of the infundibulum (pituitary stalk) is the median eminence; the infundibulum extends ventrally/inferiorly from the median eminence to become continuous with the infundibulum.

The arcuate nucleus is a part of the tuber cinereum. The lateral portions of tuber cinereum lodge the lateral tuberal nucleus, and tuberomammillary nucleus. The basolateral aspect of the tuber cinereum often presents slight elevations produced by the underlying lateral tuberal nucleus - the lateral eminence.

=== Relations ===
The tuber cinereum is situated caudal to the optic chiasm, medial to the optic tract (which flanks it on either side), and rostral to the two mammillary bodies. is continuous anteriorly with the lamina terminalis, and laterally with the anterior perforated substances.

=== Blood supply ===
Arterial blood supply to the tuber cinereum is provided by the anterior choroidal artery.

=== Microanatomy ===
Capillaries of the tuber cinereum are specialized and confluent to enable rapid communication via brain- or blood-borne factors between compartments of the tuber, a capillary system described as the hypophyseal portal system. The subregion of the hypothalamic arcuate nucleus closest to the median eminence contains specialized permeable capillaries surrounded by wide pericapillary spaces, enabling moment-to-moment sensing of circulating blood.

== Additional images ==
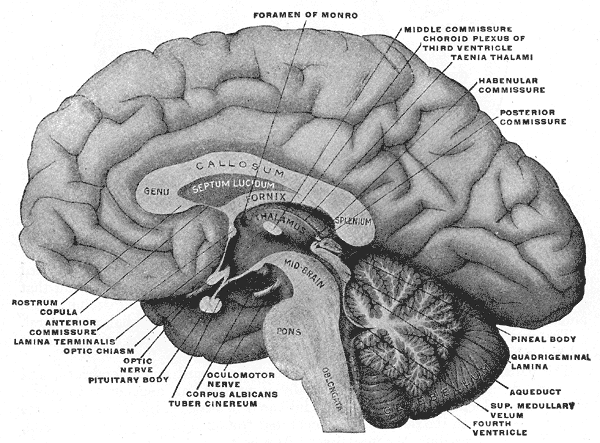
Mesal aspect of a brain sectioned in the median sagittal plane.

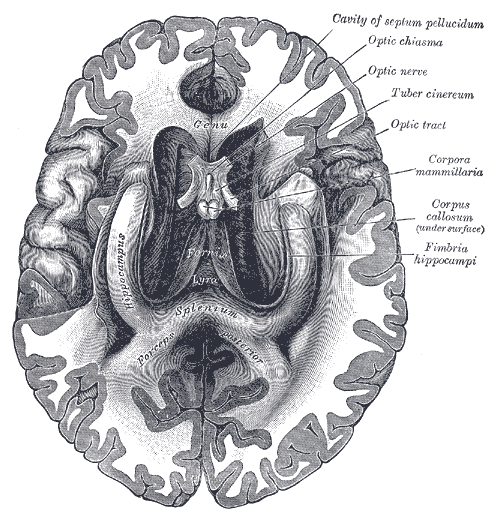
The fornix and corpus callosum from below.

== See also ==
- Tuber cinereum hamartoma
