= Tuber cinereum hamartoma =

Human disease

- Other names: Hypothalamic hamartoma
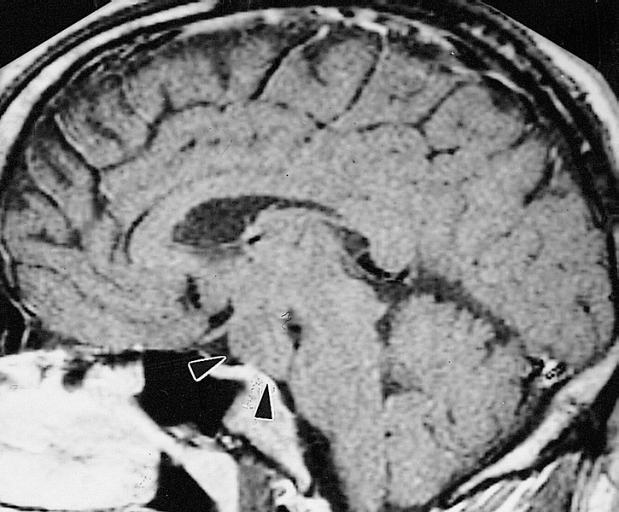
- A hypothalamic hamartoma (black arrows) on MRI

Tuber cinereum hamartoma is a benign tumor in which a disorganized collection of neurons and glia accumulate at the tuber cinereum of the hypothalamus on the floor of the third ventricle. It is a congenital malformation, included on the spectrum of gray matter heterotopias. Formation occurs during embryogenesis, typically between days 33 and 41 of gestation. Size of the tumor varies from one to three centimeters in diameter, with the mean being closer to the low end of this range. It is estimated to occur at a frequency of one in one million individuals.

== Signs and symptoms ==
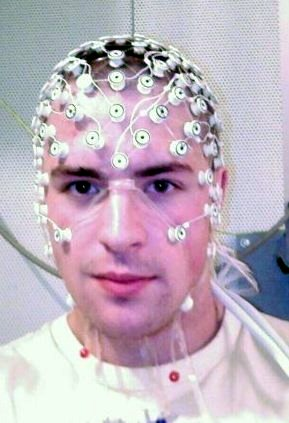
Electroencephalography is used to find the source of electrical activity causing the gelastic seizure.

The classic presentation is gelastic or laughing epilepsy, a disorder characterized by spells of involuntary laughter with interval irritability and depressed mood. The tumor can be associated with other seizure types as well as precocious puberty and behavioral disorders. Gelastic epilepsy has been more classically associated with sessile lesions and precocious puberty reported with pedunculated morphology. More recent epidemiologic studies have found these associations to be less consistent, with gelastic epilepsy predominant in the majority of patients regardless of morphology.

Hypothalamic hamartomas are found in 33% of patients with true precocious puberty. The etiology of this relationship is unclear, but it is suspected in some cases to be due to a nonphysiological secretion of GnRH. A case of hamartoma has also been reported to secrete CRH, causing excessive ACTH production.

Seizures often begin when patients are young, although studies have shown adult onset as well. Many causes of the epilepsy have been theorized, with EEG often finding the hamartoma itself as the source of electrical activity, or epileptogenic focus. With chronic seizures, cognitive decline can develop, which can manifest as poor school performance, decreased nervous stimulus IQ, or limited socialization. Other symptoms of this tumor type include visual disturbances, such as the appearance of motion from a stationary object, or inappropriate color perception of the entire visual field.

=== Associated conditions ===
Tuber cinereum hamartoma may be associated with Pallister–Hall syndrome, a diagnosis characterized by multiple malformations, including polydactyly and imperforate anus. Neurologic symptoms are less severe in Pallister-Hall than in isolated cases of hamartoma.

== Diagnosis ==
=== Anatomic and imaging findings ===
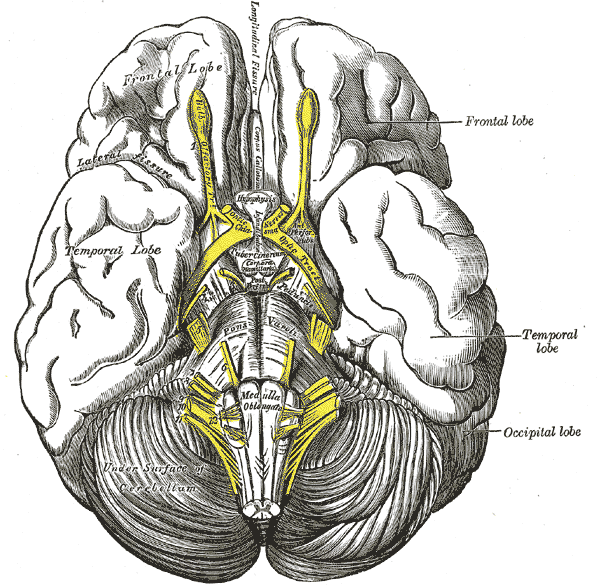
The mass is usually located at the tuber cinereum of the hypothalamus.

The tumor is difficult to detect by CT due to decreased sensitivity of the scan at the level of the sella turcica. MRI is the primary imaging modality for detection, with the lesion being of similar signal intensity to gray matter and non-enhancing with contrast. Lack of enhancement is an important imaging characteristic to help distinguish the tumor from similar masses that can occur in this region. These include germ cell tumors, granulomas of Langerhans cell histiocytosis and hypothalamic astrocytomas, as these lesions usually demonstrate at least partial uptake of contrast.

== Treatment ==
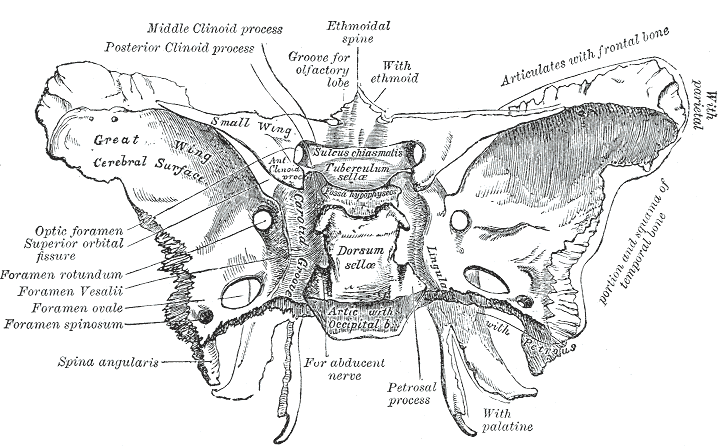
Surgical approach for removal is transsphenoidal at the base of the skull.

Hormonal suppressive therapy with luteinizing hormone receptor agonists like leuprorelin can be used to treat the seizure component, and are effective in most patients.

Surgery is offered if there is failure of medical therapy or rapid growth of lesion, with specific options including stereotactic thermocoagulation, gamma knife radiosurgery, and physical resection by transsphenoidal microsurgery. Surgical response is typically better when the seizure focus has been found by EEG to originate in or near the mass. The specific location of the lesion relative to the pituitary and infundibulum and the amount of hormonal disturbance at presentation can help predict risk of hypopituitarism following surgery.

== Society and culture ==
In the TV series Prison Break, Sara Tancredi tells Michael Scofield that he suffers from Tuber cinereum hamartoma at the end of the tenth episode of season 4.

Mentioned in Royal Pains (season five), an adult patient is diagnosed with it after describing what he calls "church giggles" and early puberty.

In the medical drama Grey's Anatomy ("Put Me In, Coach"), a patient with an "HH tumor" comes to Dr. Derek Shepherd.
