= Australian honours and awards system =

Orders, decorations, and medals of Australia

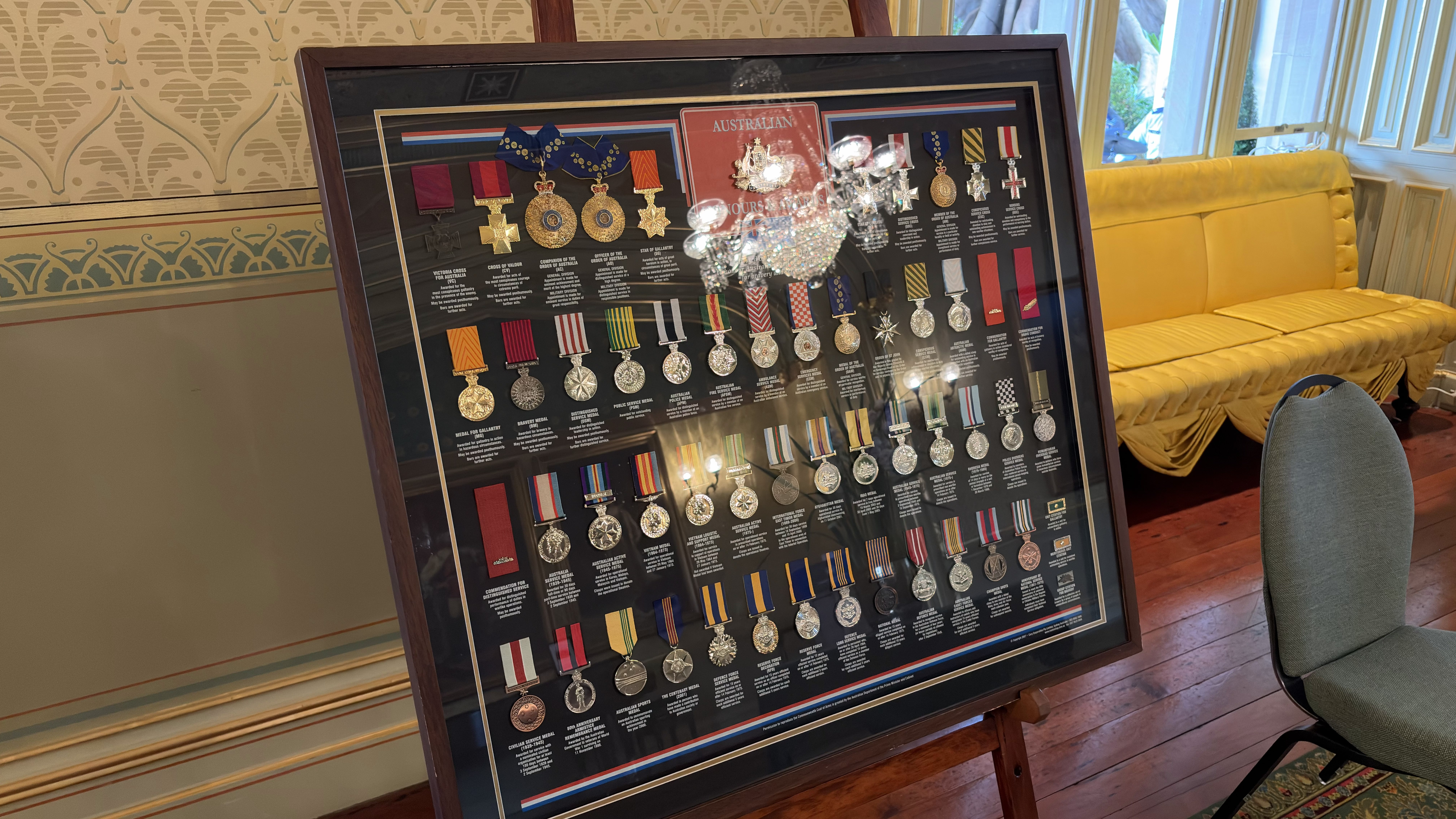
Australian Honours and Awards on display at Government House, Sydney

The Australian honours and awards system refers to all orders, decorations and medals, as instituted by letters patent from the monarch of Australia and countersigned by the prime minister at the time, that have been progressively introduced since 14 February 1975. The Australian honours and awards system excludes all state, local government and privately-issued awards and medals (although a few can be recognised in the order of wearing, including the Order of St John).

Honours and awards have been present in Australia since pre-federation, primarily from the Imperial honours and awards system. This Imperial system remained in place until its phase-out in 1994 (although the monarch of Australia may still confer some of these honours to Australians in their personal capacity). Between 1975 and 1992, the Australian honours and awards system and the Imperial honours and awards system operated in parallel, although the last Imperial awards to be made were in June 1989.

The Australian honours and awards system consists of honours, which are appointments to orders of chivalry (namely the Order of Australia), and awards (which are decorations and medals – decorations are medals for valour, gallantry, bravery, and distinguished or conspicuous service). Medals include meritorious service medals, operational service medals, campaign medals, long service medals, commemorative medals, and the Champion Shots Medal.

Both the Order of Australia, which has a General Division and Military Division (distinguished by gold banding on the edges of the ribbon), and the Australian Operational Service Medal, which has a special civilian ribbon for Defence civilians awarded it, are unique in the Australian honour and awards system in distinguishing between military and civilian awardees (although some awards in the Australian honours and awards system can only be earned by military personnel).

The Australian honours and awards system recognises the contributions of individuals, and for the Group Bravery Citation, Unit Citation for Gallantry, and Meritorious Unit Citation, the efforts of individuals as a group (the unit citations for meritorious service and gallantry also recognise members currently posted to those units, so long as they remain posted there, but without the display of the Federation Star device on those decorations that signifies personal contribution to the granting of that award). Most honours and awards are announced on Australia Day (26 January) and the King's Birthday holiday (June), with the exception of the bravery awards (typically announced in March and August), and the Australian Antarctic Medal (announced on 21 June), although some military medals are awarded all year round (as most are not gazetted). A public database of Australian honour recipients is maintained by the federal government.

== History ==
The Australian states and the Commonwealth of Australia originally used the Imperial honours system, also known as the British honours system. The creation in 1975 of the Australian honours and awards system saw Australian recommendations for the Imperial awards decline, with the last awards being gazetted in 1989. The Commonwealth of Australia ceased making recommendations for Imperial awards in 1983, with the last Queen's Birthday Australian Honours list submitted by Queensland and Tasmania in 1989. The Queen continued to confer honours upon Australians that emanate from her personally such as the Royal Victorian Order. Only a handful of peerages and baronetcies were created for Australians. Some were in recognition of public services rendered in Britain rather than Australia. Hereditary peerages and baronetcies derive from Britain. There have never been Australian peerages or baronetcies created under the Australian Crown.

Individual Australian states, as well the Commonwealth government, were full participants in the Imperial honours system. Originally there was bipartisan support, but Australian Labor Party (ALP) governments, both national and state, ceased making recommendations for Imperial awards – in particular, appointments to the Order of the British Empire mainly after 1972. During the Second World War, the Governor-General, on the advice of wartime Labor governments, made recommendations for gallantry awards, including eleven for the Victoria Cross. Appointments to the Order of the British Empire were for officers and men engaged in operational areas.

In 1975, the ALP (which had been out of power federally from 1949 until 1972) created the Australian honours and awards system. Recommendations were processed centrally, but state governors still had the power, on the advice of their governments, to submit recommendations for Imperial awards. From 1975 until 1983, the Liberal Party was in power federally, under Malcolm Fraser and, although it retained the Australian Honours and Awards System, it reintroduced recommendations for meritorious Imperial awards, but not for Imperial awards for gallantry, bravery or distinguished service. Recommendations for Imperial awards by the federal government ceased with the election of the Hawke Labor government in 1983. In 1989, the last two states to make Imperial recommendations were Queensland and Tasmania. The defeat of both governments at the polls that year marked the end of Australian recommendations for Imperial awards.

Following the UK New Year Honours List in 1990, which contained no Australian nominations for British honours, the Queen's Private Secretary, Sir William Heseltine, wrote to the Governor-General, saying "this seems a good moment to consider whether the time has not arrived for Australia, like Canada, to honour its citizens exclusively within its own system". There followed more than two years of negotiations with state governments before the Prime Minister, Paul Keating, made the announcement on 5 October 1992 that Australia would make no further recommendations for British honours. The Australian Order of Wear states that "all imperial British awards made to Australian citizens after 5 October 1992 are foreign awards and should be worn accordingly".

The Australian honours and awards system has faced various criticisms over the years. Most criticisms however are to do with who receives honours and awards, reflecting comments such as those made by Nicholas Gruen, where he said the honours and awards system had "far too much to do with how much status you've already got ... [It's about] seniority, power, privilege and patronage... [with] systematic selection in favour of people who just do their job, rather than go out of their way to do something selfless". Controversy attended these awards in 2021 when former tennis player Margaret Court received the Companion of the Order of Australia. Court is known for her homophobic and transphobic views, and GP Clara Tuck Meng Soo, journalist Kerry O'Brien, and artist Peter Kingston have rejected or returned their awards in protest.

== Nominating or applying for awards ==
Australians become recipients of each of the 55 different types of Australian awards and honours through one of two separate processes; by nomination or by application.

- Nomination: Individual nominations may be made by members of the public or a community group for the Order of Australia and Australian Bravery Decorations. Nominations for Meritorious Service Awards are based on nominations from each specific organisation. The Department of Defence also nominates individuals for a range of service decorations. Non-Australians can be given honorary awards for "extraordinary service to Australia or humanity at large". Nomination forms for the Order of Australia are available through the Australian Honours Secretariat website, or upon application to the Honours Secretariat at Government House, Canberra or from any state Government House.
- Application: Many of the honours or awards are based on an application by the recipient or a recommendation on their behalf. Awards that fall under this category include service awards for defence force and police personnel for operational service or to other individuals for special civilian services recognised by the Australian Government. Unlike Imperial bravery or gallantry awards, any person can nominate themselves for an Australian Bravery Award under the current design of the nomination form.

== Categories of honours and awards ==
The Australian honours and awards system consists of the following:

- Honours: An honour is an appointment to an order of chivalry, and the Order of Australia is the only chivalric order currently able to be awarded in the Australian honours and awards system.
- Awards: An award is a decoration or medal awarded to a person or organisation. Decorations are awards, normally in the form of a cross or a star, made for valour, gallantry, bravery, distinguished service or conspicuous service. Medals are everything else.

There are two broad categories of honours and awards.

=== Individual honours and awards ===
The honours and the awards in the Australian system are, and have been:

- those within the Australian honours and awards system;
- those conferred by the sovereign in exercise of the royal prerogative;
- those within the Order of St John;
- Imperial/British awards conferred before 6 October 1992; and
- foreign awards, the acceptance and wearing of which have been authorised by the Governor-General.

Awards of the British Empire/United Kingdom conferred after 5 October 1992 are foreign awards.

=== Military theatre and battle honours, honour titles and distinctions ===
The Australian Defence Force has a system of battle honours, theatre honours, honour titles and honour distinctions to recognise exemplary service by units (not individuals) in combat and combat-related roles. Normally, Defence Honours are not awarded below sub-unit level (an organisation normally commanded by a Major or equivalent). The recommendation for the award of battle honours, theatre honours, honour titles and honour distinctions is made by a Battle Honours Committee.

There are four categories of honours in the Defence system as follows:

- Theatre Honour: A theatre of operations is defined as a geographic area in which a campaign or series of operations is conducted and for which an operational level joint or combined commander is appointed. A Theatre Honour can be made where a unit or sub-unit of any Corps is deployed under warlike conditions. Any unit that qualifies for a Battle Honour will automatically also qualify for a Theatre Honour. Examples of Theatre Honours awarded to Australian units include Gallipoli 1915, France and Flanders 1914–1918, Middle East 1941–1944, South West Pacific 1942–1945, Korea 1950–1953 and Vietnam 1965–1972.
- Battle Honour: A battle is an operational action conducted under warlike conditions. A Battle Honour is defined as the title of a battle or a series of battles fought as a campaign, an action or an engagement and is awarded to close combat elements of a Combat Corps of the Royal Australian Navy, Australian Army or Royal Australian Air Force as a public commemoration of outstanding achievement in battle(s), action or engagement. Examples of Battle Honours awarded to Australian units include the Landing at Anzac Cove, Hamel, Tobruk, Kokoda Track, Kapyong and Coral-Balmoral.
- Honour Title: An Honour Title is awarded to any unit or sub-unit that is not entitled to a Battle Honour but which satisfies the same requirements for the award of a Battle Honour. An example of the award of an Honour Title is the title Coral, awarded to 102nd Field Battery for its outstanding achievement during the Battle of Coral–Balmoral in South Vietnam.
- Honour Distinction: An Honour Distinction is defined as a public commemoration of creditable performance by a unit or sub-unit in an operation which does not attract a Theatre, Battle or Honour Title. Honour Distinctions are intended to recognise service under operational conditions in security-related, peace keeping and peace enforcement and similar operations. The first award of an Honour Distinction was the award made to the 17th Construction Squadron for the Australian contribution to the United Nations Transition Assistance Group (UNTAG) peacekeeping mission in Namibia in 1989 and 1990.

It is common that units claim Honours from original units with a historical connection to a military predecessors of the current Unit. For example, 4th/3rd Battalion, Royal New South Wales Regiment which is a modern amalgamated unit, is entitled to the previous Honours of the 3rd Battalion, the 4th Battalion as well as the World War I Honours of the 3rd and 4th Battalions First Australian Imperial Force. The term Battle Honour can be used to denote both battle and theatre honours.

Historically the system was drawn from the British system adopted during World War I but has been modified since. A relatively recent change is the introduction of the Honours for recognition of outstanding service in dangerous operations short of declared theatres of war. Defence also has a process of Defence and Service Commendations and other honours including the Army Combat Badge and Infantry Combat Badge which are awarded by Army Headquarters.

== Australian honours and awards ==
=== Order of Australia ===
The Order of Australia insignia were designed by Stuart Devlin in 1976. Devlin used the livery colours of the Australian Coat of Arms, gold and royal blue. He also translated an individual ball of wattle blossom into a simple convex golden disc with a rich texture of beads and radiating lines accentuating a ring of blue enamel representing the sea.

The disc is surmounted by an enamel Crown. The sovereign is Head of the Order of Australia. The Governor-General is Principal Companion, Knight or Dame, and Chancellor, of the Order of Australia. The blue and gold theme is continued in the ribbon. Most of the insignia pieces are produced by the Royal Australian Mint in Canberra. The actual pieces for the two divisions of the Order are identical: it is only the ribbon which differentiates an award between the General and the Military divisions. In the Military Division the ribbon is distinguished by the addition of a narrow gold band on each edge.

When established, only the grades of Member, Officer and Companion of the Order existed. In 1976, Malcolm Fraser recommended to Queen Elizabeth II the addition of the medal and grade of Knight and Dame in the order. The grade of Knight and Dame was removed on the advice of Prime Minister Bob Hawke in 1986 without prejudice to any person who had been admitted to the order at that grade. The grade of Knight and Dame was restored on the advice of Tony Abbott (a prominent monarchist) in March 2014. In November 2015, Prime Minister Malcolm Turnbull (a prominent republican) announced that the Queen had accepted his request to amend the order's letters patent and cease awards in this class, after Cabinet had agreed that he should advise that these titles are no longer appropriate in the Australian honours and awards system. Currently there are four grades within the Order in both Military and General Divisions. People cannot be admitted to the Order posthumously; if a person is successfully nominated but dies prior to the scheduled announcement, the date of effect of the award is deemed to be a date before they died.

The Council for the Order of Australia makes recommendations to the Governor-General as to the appropriateness of a nominee to be admitted to the Order and at what grade. It is up to the Honours Secretariat to provide the council with as much fully verified information as is possible on each nominee so that appropriate consideration may be given to each case. This is a long process and up to eighteen months can elapse between the original submission and publication of a successful nomination.

- General Division ribbon
- Military Division ribbon

==== Classes ====
There are five classes of the Order of Australia as follows:

- Knight / Dame of the Order of Australia (AK / AD): Appointments to this class of the Order ceased from November 2015. A maximum of four knights and dames were appointed each year. See the full list of knights and dames of the Order of Australia.
- Companion of the Order of Australia (AC): Appointments are made for eminent achievement and merit of the highest degree in service to Australia or to humanity at large. Excluding honorary appointments, no more than 35 Companions shall be appointed in any calendar year. See the full list of companions of the Order of Australia.
- Officer of the Order of Australia (AO): Appointments made for distinguished service of a high degree to Australia or to humanity at large. Excluding honorary appointments, no more than 140 Officers shall be appointed in any calendar year.
- Member of the Order of Australia (AM): Appointment made for service in a particular locality or field of activity or to a particular group. Excluding honorary appointments, no more than 605 Members shall be appointed in any calendar year.
- Medal of the Order of Australia (OAM): Awarded for service worthy of particular recognition. There is no quota limit on awards of the Medal of the Order.

==== Recipients ====
Names in bold format are living recipients. These have included:

Order	Foundation	Motto	Officer
**Order of Australia**	1975 – Elizabeth II	None	Sam Mostyn (Chancellor)
**Order of Australia**	Knights/Dames (AK/AD): Sir John Kerr (1976), Sir Robert Menzies (1976), Sir Colin Syme (1977), Sir Zelman Cowen (1977), Sir Macfarlane Burnet (1978), Dame Alexandra Hasluck (1978), Dame Enid Lyons (1980), **Charles, Prince of Wales (as he then was)** (1981), Sir Roden Cutler (1981), Sir Garfield Barwick (1981), Sir Charles Court (1982), Sir Ninian Stephen (1982), Sir Roy Wright (1983), Sir Gordon Jackson (1983), **Dame Quentin Bryce** (2014), **Sir Peter Cosgrove** (2014), Dame Marie Bashir (2014), Prince Philip, Duke of Edinburgh (2015), **Sir Angus Houston** (2015)		

=== Gallantry ===
- Victoria Cross for Australia (VC)
- Star of Gallantry (SG)
- Medal for Gallantry (MG)
- Commendation for Gallantry

=== Bravery ===
- Cross of Valour (CV)
- Star of Courage (SC)
- Bravery Medal (BM)
- Commendation for Brave Conduct
- Group Bravery Citation

=== Distinguished Service ===
- Distinguished Service Cross (DSC)
- Distinguished Service Medal (DSM)
- Commendation for Distinguished Service

=== Conspicuous Service ===
- Conspicuous Service Cross (CSC)
- Conspicuous Service Medal (CSM)

=== Nursing Service ===
- Nursing Service Cross (NSC)

=== Meritorious Service ===
- Public Service Medal (PSM)
- Australian Police Medal (APM)
- Australian Fire Service Medal (AFSM)
- Ambulance Service Medal (ASM)
- Emergency Services Medal (ESM)
- Australian Corrections Medal (ACM)
- Australian Intelligence Medal (AIM)
- Australian Antarctic Medal (AAM)

=== Campaign Medals ===
- Australia Service Medal 1939–45
- Australian Active Service Medal 1945–1975
- Australian Service Medal 1945–1975
- Australian General Service Medal for Korea
- Vietnam Medal
- Vietnam Logistic and Support Medal
- Australian Active Service Medal
- Australian Service Medal
- Rhodesia Medal
- International Force East Timor Medal (INTERFET)
- Afghanistan Medal
- Iraq Medal
- Australian Operational Service Medal – Border Protection
- Australian Operational Service Medal – Civilian
- Australian Operational Service Medal – Greater Middle East Operation
- Australian Operational Service Medal – Special Operations
- Australian Operational Service Medal – Counter Terrorism/Special Recovery
- Australian Operational Service Medal – Africa
- Australian Operational Service Medal – Indo-Pacific

=== Special Service ===
- Police Overseas Service Medal
- Humanitarian Overseas Service Medal
- National Emergency Medal
- Civilian Service Medal 1939–1945
- National Police Service Medal
- Australian Sports Medal (2000, 2021–present)

=== Commemorative ===
- 80th Anniversary Armistice Remembrance Medal
- Centenary Medal

=== Long Service ===
- Defence Force Service Medal
- Reserve Force Decoration (RFD)
- Reserve Force Medal
- Defence Long Service Medal
- National Medal
- Australian Cadet Forces Service Medal
- Service Medal of the Order of St John

=== Other Defence Medals ===
- Australian Defence Medal
- Champion Shots Medal
- Anniversary of National Service 1951–1972 Medal

== Royal honours ==
The Sovereign may confer honours upon Australians through his personal gift (according to their personal choice). Such honours remain formally part of the imperial honours system and are administered by the UK. Bold names are living recipients. These have included:

Order	Foundation	Motto	Officer(s)
Most Noble Order of the Garter	1348 – Edward III	Honi soit qui mal y pense "Shame upon him who thinks evil upon it"	The Baroness Manningham-Buller (Chancellor)
Most Noble Order of the Garter	Knights/Ladies Companion (KG/LG): Richard Casey, Baron Casey (1969), Sir Paul Hasluck (1979), Sir Ninian Stephen (1994)		
Most Ancient and Most Noble Order of the Thistle	1687 – James VII of Scotland (James II of England)	Nemo me impune lacessit "No one provokes me with impunity"	The Duke of Buccleuch and Queensberry (Chancellor)
Most Ancient and Most Noble Order of the Thistle	Knights/Ladies (KT/LT): Sir Robert Menzies (1963)		
Order of Merit	1902 – Edward VII	"For Merit"	The Lord Janvrin (Registrar and Secretary)
Order of Merit	Members (OM): Samuel Alexander (1930), Gilbert Murray (1941), Sir Macfarlane Burnet (1958), Sir Owen Dixon (1963), Howard Florey, Baron Florey (1965), Sir Sidney Nolan (1983), Dame Joan Sutherland (1991), Robert May, Baron May of Oxford (2002), John Howard (2012)		
Royal Victorian Order	1896 – Victoria	"Victoria"	The Princess Royal (Grand Master); The Lord Benyon (Chancellor)
Royal Victorian Order	Knights/Dames Grand Cross (GCVO): Sir Paul Hasluck (1970), Sir John Kerr (1977), Sir Zelman Cowen (1980), Sir Ninian Stephen (1982), Sir William Heseltine (1990) Knights/Dames Commander (KCVO/DCVO): Sir Brudenell White (1920), Sir Bertram Mackennal (1921), Sir George Pearce (1927), Sir Leighton Bracegirdle (1947), Sir Frank Berryman (1954), Sir Eric Harrison (1954), Sir John Lavarack (1954), Sir John Northcott (1954), Sir Percy Spender (1957), Sir Robert Jackson (1962), Sir Roy Dowling (1963), Sir Eric Woodward (1963), Sir Murray Tyrrell (1968), Sir Roden Cutler (1970), Sir Alan Mansfield (1970), Sir Reg Pollard (1970), Sir Stanley Burbury (1977), Sir Colin Hannah (1977), Sir Douglas Nicholls (1977), Sir James Scholtens (1977), Sir Wallace Kyle (1977), Sir Henry Winneke (1977), Sir John Yocklunn (1977), Sir Keith Seaman (1981), Sir James Ramsay (1981), Sir David Smith (1990)		
Most Venerable Order of the Hospital of Saint John of Jerusalem	Royal charter 1888 – Victoria	Pro fide and Pro utilitate hominum "For the faith" and "For utility of men"	The Duke of Gloucester (Grand Prior); Mark Compton (Lord Prior)
Most Venerable Order of the Hospital of Saint John of Jerusalem	Bailiffs/Dames Grand Cross (GCStJ): Villis Raymond Marshall (1999), John David Spencer (2006), Neil Conn (2012), John Pearn (2014), Mark Compton (2017)		
Queen Elizabeth II Golden Jubilee Medal (2002)	Awarded by the Queen to living holders of the Victoria Cross (2) and George Cross (1)		
Queen Elizabeth II Golden Jubilee Medal (2002)	Awarded to: Edward Kenna, Keith Payne, Michael Pratt		
Queen Elizabeth II Diamond Jubilee Medal (2012)	Awarded by the Queen to living holders of the Victoria Cross (1), Victoria Cross for Australia (3), George Cross (1) and the Cross of Valour (5)		
Queen Elizabeth II Diamond Jubilee Medal (2012)	Awarded to: Keith Payne, Mark Donaldson, Ben Roberts-Smith, Daniel Keighran, Michael Pratt, Darrell Tree, Victor Boscoe, Allan Sparkes, Timothy Britten, Richard Joyes		
Queen Elizabeth II Platinum Jubilee Medal (2022)	Awarded by the Queen to living holders of the Victoria Cross (1), Victoria Cross for Australia (3), George Cross (1) and the Cross of Valour (5)		
Queen Elizabeth II Platinum Jubilee Medal (2022)	Awarded to: Keith Payne, Mark Donaldson, Ben Roberts-Smith, Daniel Keighran, Michael Pratt, Darrell Tree, Victor Boscoe, Allan Sparkes, Timothy Britten, Richard Joyes		
King Charles III Coronation Medal (2023)	Awarded by the King to living holders of the Victoria Cross (1), Victoria Cross for Australia (3), George Cross (1) and the Cross of Valour (5), the Earl of Loudoun and to members of the Australian Defence Force (60)		

== Imperial honours ==
Imperial honours awarded to Australians, if awarded since 5 October 1992, are no longer part of the Australian honours and awards system, and are foreign awards. Bold names are living recipients.

Prior to 6 October 1992, such honours were part of the Australian system (and awards made prior to that date still retain legal recognition in Australia):

Order	Foundation	Motto	Officer(s)
Baronet/Baronetess	1611 – James VI and I	None	Sir Nicholas Bacon, 14th Baronet (Premier Baronet)
Baronet/Baronetess	Sir Saul Samuel, 1st Baronet, created (1898), extant, Sir John Michael Glen Samuel, 5th Baronet (present holder); Sir Samuel Way, 1st Baronet, of Montefiore, in the Colony of South Australia (1899), extinct 1916; Sir William Clarke, 1st Baronet, of Rupertswood, in the Colony of Victoria (1882), extant, Sir Rupert Grant Alexander Clarke, 4th Baronet (present holder); Sir Daniel Cooper, 1st Baronet, of Woollahra, in the Colony of New South Wales (1863), extant, Sir William Daniel Charles Cooper, 6th Baronet (present holder); Sir Charles Nicholson, 1st Baronet, of Luddenham, in the Colony of New South Wales (1859), extinct 1986		
Most Honourable Order of the Bath	1725 – George I	Tria iuncta in uno "Three joined in one"	The Prince of Wales (Great Master); Air Chief Marshal Sir Stephen Dalton (King of Arms)
Most Honourable Order of the Bath	Knights/Dames Grand Cross (GCB): Sir George Reid (1916), Sir Isaac Isaacs (1937), Sir Arthur Longmore (1941), Sir Edmund Hudleston (1963), Sir Wallace Kyle (1966), Sir John Hackett (1967), Sir William Heseltine (1990); Knights/Dames Commander (KCB/DCB): Sir William Bridges (1915), Sir Neville Howse (1917), Sir Harry Chauvel (1918), Sir Talbot Hobbs (1918), Sir John Monash (1918), Sir John Gellibrand (1919), Sir Thomas Glasgow (1919), Sir Charles Rosenthal (1919), Sir Brudenell White (1927), Sir George Hyde (1934), Sir Julius Bruche (1935), Sir Douglas Evill (1940), Sir Arthur Coningham (1941), Sir Thomas Blamey (1942), Sir Leslie Morshead (1942), Sir Peter Drummond (1943)		
Most Distinguished Order of Saint Michael and Saint George	1818 – Prince George, Prince Regent	Auspicium melioris ævi "Token of a better age"	The Duke of Kent (Grand Master); The Baroness Ashton of Upholland (Chancellor); Sir Mark Lyall Grant (King of Arms)
Most Distinguished Order of Saint Michael and Saint George	Knights/Dames Grand Cross (GCMG): Sir Henry Ayers (1894), Sir Frederick Darley (1901), Sir John Forrest (1901), Sir Edmund Barton (1902), Sir John Madden (1906), Sir George Reid (1911), Sir Joseph Cook (1918), Sir Harry Chauvel (1919), Sir John Monash (1919), Sir Isaac Isaacs (1932), Sir John Higgins (1934), Sir John Latham (1935), Sir William Irvine (1936), Sir Robert Garran (1937), Sir Earle Page (1938), Sir James Mitchell (1947), Sir William McKell (1951), Sir Owen Dixon (1954), Sir Thomas Playford (1957), Sir Arthur Fadden (1958), Sir Garfield Barwick (1965), Richard Casey, Baron Casey (1965), Sir Paul Hasluck (1969), Sir John McEwen (1971), Sir Henry Bolte (1978), Sir Robert Askin (1975), Sir John Kerr (1976), Sir Zelman Cowen (1977), Sir John Gorton (1977), Sir William McMahon (1977), Sir Harry Gibbs (1981), Sir Ninian Stephen (1982)		
Most Excellent Order of the British Empire	1917 – George V	"For God and the Empire"	The Queen (Grand Master); Lieutenant General Sir Simon Mayall (King of Arms)
Most Excellent Order of the British Empire	Knights/Dames Grand Cross (GBE): Dame Flora Reid (1917), Sir Owen Cox (1920), Sir Thomas Robinson (1920), Dame Mary Hughes (1922), Dame Nellie Melba (1927), Sir Robert Gibson (1932), Sir Thomas Blamey (1943), Sir Douglas Evill (1946), Dame Pattie Menzies (1954), Dame Enid Lyons (1957)		
Order of the Companions of Honour	1917 – George V	"In action faithful and in honour clear"	The Princess of Wales (Royal Companion)
Order of the Companions of Honour	Members (CH): Joseph Lyons (1936), Billy Hughes (1941), Sir Earle Page (1942), Essington Lewis (1943), Richard Casey, Baron Casey (1944), Sir Robert Menzies (1951), Harold Holt (1967), Sir John McEwen (1969), Sir John Gorton (1971), Sir William McMahon (1972), Malcolm Fraser (1977), Doug Anthony (1981)		
Knight Bachelor	13th century (rank) – Henry III; 1912 (Imperial Society) – George V	"Trouthe and Honour"	Sir Christopher Greenwood (Knight Principal); Sir Tony Baldry (Registrar)
Knight Bachelor	Living Knights Bachelor: Sir Gustav Nossal (1977), Sir William Kearney (1982), Sir Rod Eddington (2005), Sir Marc Feldmann (2010), Sir Trevor Garland (2010), Sir David Higgins (2011), Michael, Baron Hintze (2013), Sir Jonathan Mills (2013), Sir Chris Clarke (2015), Sir Lynton Crosby (2016), Sir Frank Lowy (2017), Sir Pascal Soriot (2022), Sir Arthur Llewellyn Jones (2024); all other Knights Bachelor		

== Foreign honours – including UN and NATO service ==
Specific foreign awards are not mentioned on the Order of Wear document – just the general comment that foreign awards appear after the awards mentioned.

A list of foreign honours commonly awarded to Australians appears at Australian Honours Order of Wearing#Foreign awards.

A list of foreign awards commonly awarded to Australians for campaign and peacekeeping service appears at Australian Campaign Medals#Foreign awards.

Permission for formal acceptance and wearing of foreign awards is given by the Governor-General on the recommendation of the Prime Minister or the minister responsible for Australian honours.

Additional information regarding UN medals can be found on the Australian Defence Force website.

== See also ==
- Australian Honours Order of Wearing
- Australian campaign medals
- List of post-nominal letters (Australia)
- Australian of the Year
- British honours system
- A list of living Australian knights and dames
- A list of all Australian knights and dames
- Australian Commendations
- New South Wales Honours
- Queensland Honours
- Defence Honours and Awards scandal
