= Australia Service Medal =

Australia Service Medal and Australian Service Medal may refer to:

- Australia Service Medal 1939–1945
- Australian Service Medal 1945–1975
- Australian Service Medal (1975–2012)
- Australian Operational Service Medal (2012–)

== See also ==
- Australian Active Service Medal 1945–1975
- Australian Active Service Medal (1975–2012)
- Australian General Service Medal Korea (1953–1956)
- General Service Medal (1918) (1918–1962)
- General Service Medal (1962) (1962–2007)
