= Keith Payne =

Australian soldier and Victoria Cross recipient (born 1933)

Keith Payne VC, AM
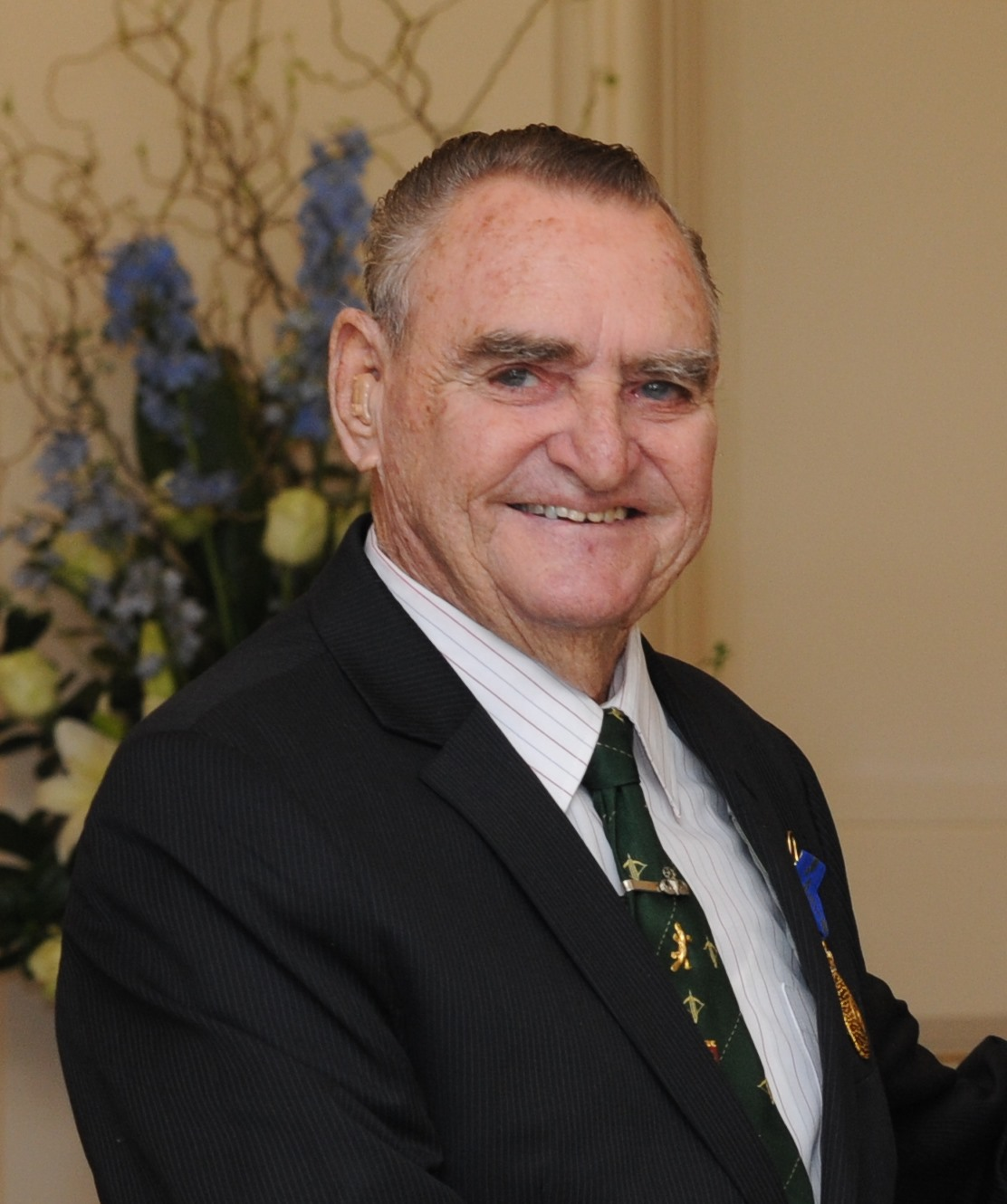
- Payne in 2015
- Born: 30 August 1933 (age 93); Ingham, Queensland, Australia
- Military career
- Allegiance: Australia
- Branch: Australian Army
- Service years: 1951–1975
- Rank: Warrant officer class two
- Units: Royal Australian Regiment; Australian Army Training Team Vietnam
- Conflicts: Korean War; Indonesia–Malaysia confrontation Vietnam War; Dhofar War
- Awards: Victoria Cross; Member of the Order of Australia; Distinguished Service Cross (United States); Silver Star (United States); Cross of Gallantry (Vietnam)
- Other work: Counselling sufferers of post-traumatic stress disorder

Keith Payne, VC, AM (born 30 August 1933) is a retired Australian soldier and a recipient of the Victoria Cross (VC), the highest decoration for gallantry "in the presence of the enemy" awarded to members of the British and Commonwealth armed forces. Payne's VC was awarded for his actions during the Vietnam War. Aged 93, he is the last living Australian recipient of the original Imperial Victoria Cross. (Note: Mark Donaldson, Ben Roberts-Smith and Daniel Keighran are recipients of the Victoria Cross for Australia, a separate award to the original Victoria Cross. Edward Kenna, the last living Australian recipient from the Second World War, died on 8 July 2009.)

== Early life ==
Keith Payne was born at Ingham, Queensland, on 30 August 1933, the son of Romilda (Millie) Hussey and Henry Thomas Payne. He attended Ingham State School and later became an apprentice cabinet-maker. Dissatisfied with working as a tradesman, Payne joined the Australian Regular Army in August 1951 and, after brief period in the Citizen Military Forces (CMF), was posted to the 2nd Battalion, Royal Australian Regiment (2RAR) and in the following year transferred to the 1st Battalion, Royal Australian Regiment (1RAR).

== Military career ==
=== Early career ===
Payne served with his unit in the Korean War from April 1952 to March 1953. He married Florence Plaw, a member of the Women's Royal Australian Army Corps, in December 1954, and was promoted to corporal the following year. Payne served in Malaya with this unit and in 1965, as a sergeant, he joined the 5th Battalion. In June 1965, by now a warrant officer class II, Payne was a fieldcraft instructor on the staff of the Officer Training Unit, Scheyville, established to commission national servicemen. In February 1967 he was posted to Papua New Guinea, where he served with the 2nd Battalion, Pacific Islands Regiment. He remained there until March 1968 when he returned to Brisbane. On 24 February 1969 he was posted to the Australian Army Training Team Vietnam (AATTV).

==== Victoria Cross ====
In May 1969 Payne was commanding the 212th Company of the 1st Mobile Strike Force Battalion, when it was attacked by a strong People's Army of Vietnam force near Ben Het Camp. The company was isolated and, surrounded on three sides, its Vietnamese troops began to fall back. At this point fragments from a grenade burst struck Payne, lodging in his skull, arms and hands; under heavy fire, Payne covered the withdrawal before organising his troops into a defensive perimeter. Disregarding his own serious wounds, he then returned to the battlefield and spent a further three hours, frequently under fire, searching for any remaining members of his unit. Payne located about 40 of his men, most of them wounded; he assisted some of the wounded himself and organised assistance for others, before leading the party back to base through an area now dominated by enemy forces.

Payne's actions that night earned him the Victoria Cross (VC), which was gazetted on 19 September 1969. He was evacuated to Brisbane in September suffering from an illness, receiving a warm reception at the airport before entering hospital. In January 1970 Payne was posted to the Royal Military College, Duntroon as an instructor.

Payne received his VC from Queen Elizabeth II aboard the Royal Yacht Britannia in Brisbane on 13 April 1970. He was made a freeman of the city and of the shire in which his hometown was located. A park in Stafford, Brisbane, (where Payne lived) was also named after him. He also received the Distinguished Service Cross and the Silver Star from the United States of America and the Republic of Vietnam awarded Payne the Vietnam Gallantry Cross with Bronze Star.

==== Victoria Cross citation ====
Victoria Cross citation published in The London Gazette, 19th September 1969.

On 24TH May 1969, in Kontum Province, Warrant Officer Payne was Commanding 212th Company of 1st Mobile Strike Force Battalion when the battalion was attacked by a North Vietnamese force of superior strength. Under this heavy attack the indigenous soldiers began to fall back. Directly exposing himself to the enemy's fire, Warrant Officer Payne, through his own efforts, temporarily held off the assaults by alternately firing his weapon and running from position to position collecting grenades and throwing them at the assaulting enemy. While doing this he was wounded in the hand and arms. Despite his outstanding efforts, the indigenous soldiers gave way under the enemy's increased pressure and the Battalion Commander, together with several advisors and a few soldiers, withdrew. Paying no attention to his wounds and under extremely heavy enemy fire, Warrant Officer Payne covered his withdrawal by throwing grenades and firing his own weapon at the enemy who were attempting to follow up. Still under fire, he then ran across exposed ground to head off his own troops who were withdrawing in disorder. He successfully stopped them and organised the remnants of his and the second company into a temporary defensive perimeter by nightfall.

Having achieved this, Warrant Officer Payne of his own accord and at great personal risk, moved out of the perimeter into the darkness alone in an attempt to find the wounded and other indigenous soldiers. He finally collected forty lost soldiers, some of whom had been wounded and returned with this group to the temporary defensive position he had left, only to find that the remainder of the battalion had moved back. Undeterred by this setback and personally assisting a seriously wounded American advisor he led the group through the enemy to the safety of his battalion base. His sustained and heroic personal efforts, in this action were outstanding and undoubtedly saved the lives of a large number of his indigenous soldiers and several of his fellow advisors.

Warrant Officer Payne's repeated acts of exceptional personal bravery and unselfish conduct in this operation were an inspiration to all Vietnamese, United States and Australian soldiers who served with him. His conspicuous gallantry was in the highest traditions of the Australian Army

==== Distinguished Service Cross ====
Payne’s actions during the Battle of Ben Het in May 1969 resulted in multiple awards for gallantry from Australia, the United States, and the Republic of Vietnam. As well as being awarded the Victoria Cross, he was awarded the Distinguished Service Cross, the United States Army’s second-highest decoration for extraordinary heroism in combat. The award recognised his conduct during the same engagement, including his leadership under intense enemy fire while commanding 212th Company.

The Distinguished Service Cross recognised Payne’s repeated acts of bravery during the battle, including his efforts to hold off enemy assaults, reorganise withdrawing forces, establish a defensive perimeter, and recover and lead wounded soldiers to safety despite his own serious injuries. His actions were carried out over several hours while exposed to sustained hostile fire and were credited with saving numerous lives.

==== Distinguished Service Cross Citation ====
The President of the United States of America, authorized by Act of Congress, July 9, 1918 (amended by act of July 25, 1963), takes pleasure in presenting the Distinguished Service Cross to Chief Warrant Officer (WO-2) Keith Payne, Australian Army, for extraordinary heroism in connection with military operations involving conflict with an armed hostile force in the Republic of Vietnam, while serving with the Australian Army Training Team. While personally leading the 212th Company, 1st Mobile Strike Force Battalion, in Kontum Province, Republic of Vietnam, on 24 May 1969, his company was attacked by an overwhelming force of the North Vietnamese Army. The attack isolated the two lead companies.

They then came under heavy rocket and mortar fire and an infantry ground assault from three directions. This intensive attack caused the strike force to begin withdrawing. Warrant Officer Payne, exposing himself to enemy fire, rallied the troops by firing his personal weapon and running from position to position, collecting and hurling grenades at the attacking enemy. He was wounded in his hands and arms. Despite his outstanding efforts, the indigenous soldiers retreated and the battalion commander and staff retreated with them. Warrant Officer Payne covered this retreat by firing his weapons and throwing grenades. Under heavy fire he ran across exposed terrain to stop the disorderly withdrawal – and as night fell – organized his company into defensive perimeter. He then proceeded into enemy held territory collecting some forty wounded and lost soldiers. Upon returning to the defensive perimeter, he found that his battalion had left.

Undeterred he continued collecting staggers [sic] and led them and four American soldiers to a final rendezvous where he supervised the evacuation of all wounded personnel. He refused to be evacuated until all other wounded had departed the area. Through his sustained and courageous soldiery [sic] performance, he saved the lives of his American comrades in arms and many Vietnamese soldiers, bringing great credit to the Australian and United States Armies

== Later career ==
Payne was later posted to the 42nd Battalion, Royal Queensland Regiment. He retired from the Australian Army in 1975, but saw further action as a captain with the Sultan of Oman's Royal Army against communist forces in the Dhofar War in 1975 and 1976.

== Later life ==
Payne joined the Legion of Frontiersmen in 1975 and holds the rank of an Honorary Chief Commissioner. After returning to Australia, he became active in the veteran community, particularly in counselling sufferers of post-traumatic stress disorder.

In 1991, Payne was struck on the hand by a platypus spur while trying to rescue the stranded animal. He described the pain as worse than being struck by shrapnel. A month later he was still experiencing pain in that hand. In 2006, Payne reported discomfort and stiffness when carrying out some physical activities such as using a hammer.

Payne and his wife raised five sons and live in Mackay, Queensland. He was awarded the Medal of the Order of Australia (OAM) for his service to the veteran community in 2006, while Flo Payne was recognised with an OAM for her service to the community, particularly through surf lifesaving and veteran's families, in 2011.

Payne was interviewed for the 2006 television docudrama Victoria Cross Heroes, which also included archive footage and dramatisations of his actions.

In September 2012 Payne became a Patron of the Victoria Cross Trust. The mental health ward at Greenslopes Private Hospital in Brisbane is named the Keith Payne Unit (KPU), in his honour.

Payne was advanced to a Member of the Order of Australia in June 2015. The award recognised his "significant service to veterans and their families as an ambassador, patron and as an advocate for veterans' health and welfare".

Payne is a patron of Australians for Constitutional Monarchy. On 19 September 2022, he attended the state funeral of Queen Elizabeth II. He represented recipients of the Victoria Cross at the 2023 Coronation.

== Honours and awards ==

Victoria Cross (VC)	19 September 1969
Member of the Order of Australia (AM)	8 June 2015
Medal of the Order of Australia (OAM)	26 January 2006
Australian Active Service Medal 1945–1975	with clasps for KOREA, MALAYSIA, VIETNAM and THAI-MALAY
Korea Medal	
United Nations Service Medal for Korea	
General Service Medal (1962)	with MALAY PENINSULA clasp
Vietnam Medal	
Australian Service Medal 1945–1975	with clasps KOREA, SE ASIA and PNG
Queen Elizabeth II Silver Jubilee Medal	1977
Queen Elizabeth II Golden Jubilee Medal	2002
Queen Elizabeth II Diamond Jubilee Medal	2012
Queen Elizabeth II Platinum Jubilee Medal	2022
King Charles III Coronation Medal	2 May 2024
Centenary Medal	1 January 2001
Defence Force Service Medal with 2 clasps	25–29 years service
National Medal	25 January 1982
Australian Defence Medal	
Meritorious Service Medal (Australia)	
Long Service and Good Conduct Medal – Army	
Distinguished Service Cross (United States)	
Silver Star (USA)	
Cross of Gallantry with Bronze Star (South Vietnam)	
Vietnam Campaign Medal (South Vietnam)	
Dhofar Campaign Medal (Oman)	Also referred to as: General Service Medal (Oman)
Dhofar Victory Medal (Oman)	Also referred to as: Endurance Medal (Al-Sumood) (Oman)
Pingat Jasa Malaysia (Malaysia)	
Republic of Korea War Service Medal (South Korea)	

Unit awards

Meritorious Unit Commendation (USA)	Worn by members of the Australian Army Training Team Vietnam
Cross of Gallantry with Palm Unit Citation (South Vietnam)	Worn by members of the Australian Army Training Team Vietnam

== Notes ==
Footnotes

Citations
