= Australian Operational Service Medal =

- Australian Operational Service Medal with: "Border Protection" ribbon (top) and "Greater Middle East Operation" ribbon
- Type: Campaign medal
- Awarded for: Service on declared hazardous operations
- Presented by: Australia
- Eligibility: Military – Willingly and ably perform their work as part of an operation or within other specific hazardous environments and conditions. Civilian – Defence civilians, and other classes of civilian who are employed on ADF operations under the provisions of the Defence Force Discipline Act 1982.
- Clasps: "accumulated service device" for military awards Clasps for operations for civilian awards
- Status: Currently issued
- Established: 22 May 2012
- First award: 12 December 2012
- Reverse

Order of Wear
- Next (higher): Australian Service Medal
- Next (lower): Rhodesia Medal

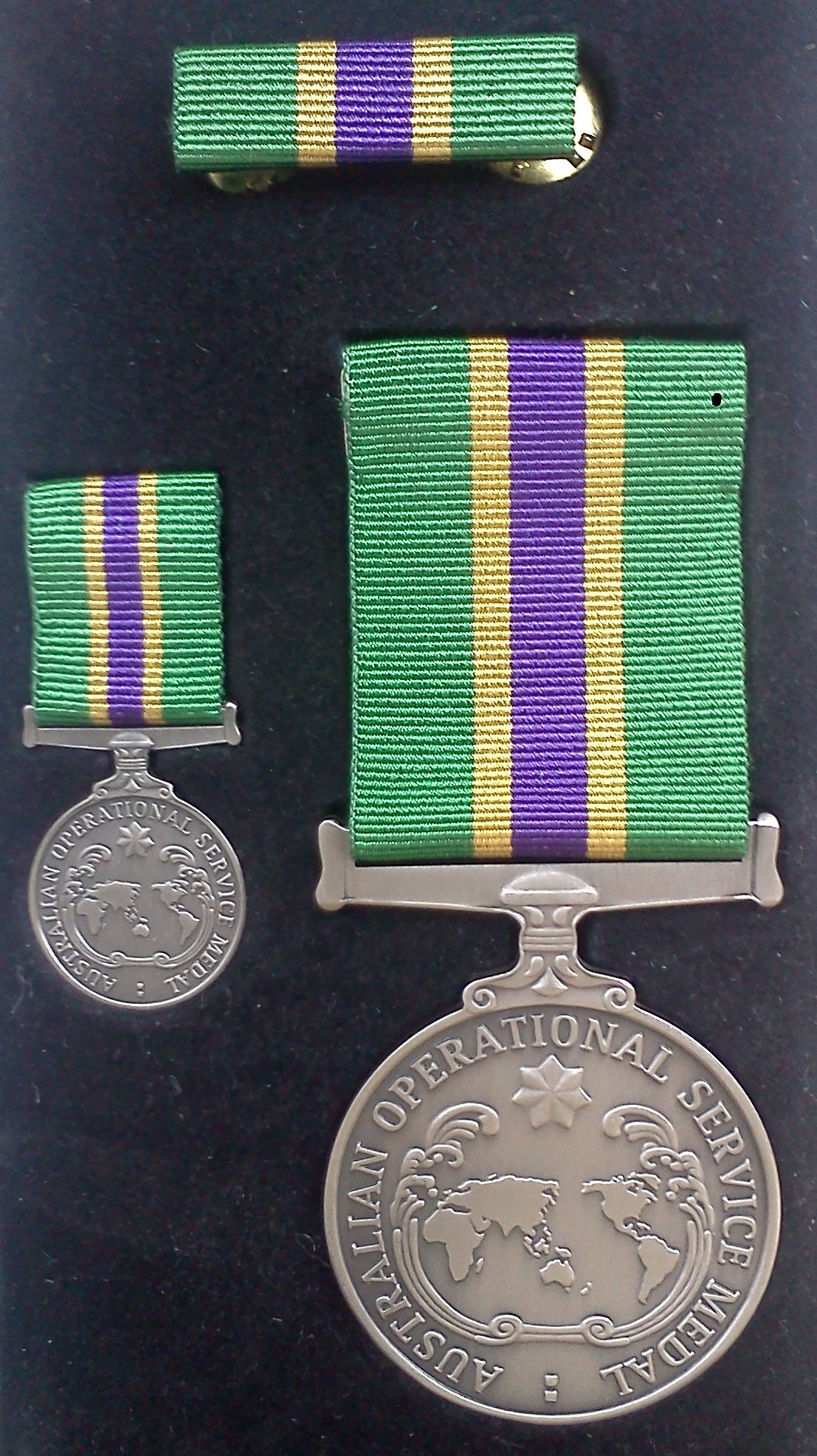
AOSM with Civilian ribbon

The Australian Operational Service Medal is a campaign medal established on 22 May 2012 to recognise service by Australian Defence Force (ADF) personnel on designated hazardous operations. It may also be awarded to civilians who serve alongside the ADF on designated operations under specific conditions.

It replaces the Australian Active Service Medal and Australian Service Medal for future ADF operations. The medal is issued to military personnel with a different ribbon for each designated operation. When issued to civilians, a standard ribbon is issued with clasps issued for each designated operation.

== Overview ==
The Australian Operational Service Medal is a campaign medal established by Royal Letters Patent on 22 May 2012. This campaign medal was instituted as a replacement for future issues of the Australian Active Service Medal and Australian Service Medal and operational campaign medals for the Australian Defence Force, as well as to recognise the service of Defence civilians in declared operational areas. It is awarded as either a military or civilian variant.

=== Military version ===
The military version of the medal has a standard medal design, but ribbons vary by operation. An accumulated service device will be awarded for subsequent qualifying service by ADF members where they undertake further service on an operation for which they have already been awarded the Australian Operational Service Medal.

==== Ribbons ====
To date, six ribbons for ADF service have been announced:

The Border Protection ribbon has three equal stripes of dark blue, ochre and dark green which denote the seas and sky, the deserts, and the forests and grasslands.
The Greater Middle East Operation ribbon has three equal stripes of mid green, black and light blue, edged by two slim stripes of light sand. Sand represents the desert sands, green represents Australia and hope, black represents anti-piracy, and blue represents the maritime and air aspects.
The Special Operations ribbon is 32 mm wide in black with a central stripe of red. Additional accumulated service is denoted by an 8 mm high Arabic numeral with an antique silver finish.
The Counter Terrorism/Special Recovery ribbon is 32 mm with black edges, symbolising counter-terrorism operations fading to grey to symbolise the urban nature of operations. The blue stripes, which flank the central white stripe, represent the broader contribution of the Special Operation command staff. The white symbolises the peaceful outcome as a final action.
The Africa ribbon is 32 mm as a central red stripe, flanked by black stripes of equal width, bordered with golden yellow and White stripes of equal width and edged with mid-green stripes.
The Indo-Pacific ribbon is 32 mm as a central yellow stripe surrounded by green stripes, which are flanked by light blue stripes. The yellow and light blue stripes are of equal width. The ribbon is edged with deep blue stripes of the same width as the green stripes.

=== Civilian version ===
The Australian Operational Service Medal (Civilian) was established to allow for recognition of Defence civilians, who had agreed to be subject to the Defence Force Discipline Act 1982 and were employed overseas to support the operations of a deployed military force in a declared area of operations. The civilian version uses the same medal design as the military version, but is awarded with a unique civilian ribbon and a clasp denoting the declared operation. Subsequent qualifying service for civilians will be (is) denoted by clasps.

The Civilian ribbon is green with central stripes of gold and purple. The purple represents Defence, and the green and gold are Australia's national colours.

==== Clasps ====
Clasps announced (and awarded) to date are listed below.

== Variants for declared operations – Military version ==
=== Australian Operational Service Medal – Border Protection (AOSM-BP) ===
The variant for border protection operations was announced on 19 July 2012. This variant will be (is) awarded to Australian Defence Force personnel who have served on border protection operations since 1997. The ribbon for the medal is 32 mm wide with a central stripe of ochre flanked by one blue stripe and one green stripe of equal width.

The declared operations are:

Operation	From	To	Notes
CRANBERRY	1 August 1997	16 July 2006	
DIRK	1 September 1997	31 October 1997	
STANHOPE	3 February 1998	6 March 1998	
MISTRAL	1 August 1998	30 June 2006	
TEEBONE	8 April 2001	7 May 2001	
CELESTA	1 August 2001	31 July 2006	
SUTTON	25 January 2002	19 February 2002	
GEMSBOK	29 August 2003	3 October 2003	
RELEX	3 September 2001	13 March 2002	
RELEX II	14 March 2002	16 July 2006	
RESOLUTE	17 July 2006	ongoing	

Personnel who served on naval vessels, maritime patrol aircraft or Regional Force Surveillance Unit patrols whilst assigned to any of these operations may be eligible.

Members of the Australian Defence Force must have served either an aggregate of 30 days either deployed or force assigned as a member of one of the declared operations, or were deployed or force assigned to a declared operation and completed 30 sorties from a unit assigned to the operation, so long as the sorties were conducted over a period of not less than 30 aggregate days with no more than one sortie counted per day.

Members must also have been:

- Deployed at sea directly supporting a declared operation
- Deployed on land or in the air, dedicated in support of a declared operation
- Deployed forward to exclusively support a declared operation.

==== Exclusions ====
Members are not eligible for an award of the AOSM-BP where an entitlement exists to another Australian medal for the same deployment.

Members are not eligible for an award of the AOSM-BP where the member was part of:

- Headquarters staff at Joint Operations Command;
- Headquarters staff at Northern Command;
- Headquarters staff at Military Strategic Commitments;
- Headquarters staff at Regional Force Surveillance Unit;
- Australian Defence Force staff at Border Protection Command; or
- Base maintainers and support personnel
- Rifle Company Butterworth personnel providing direct support to Border Protection operations via airfield and aircraft security.

=== Australian Operational Service Medal – Greater Middle East Operation (AOSM-GMEO) ===
The eligibility requirements for this medal are:

- 30 days service, continuous or aggregated, on either of the below operations
- The ADF member is force assigned for operational duties.

The declared operations are:

Operation	From	To	Notes
MANITOU	1 July 2014	ongoing	
ACCORDION	1 July 2014	ongoing	
HIGHROAD	1 January 2015	June 2021	
OKRA	1 January 2015	20 December 2024	
MAZURKA	1 November 2023	ongoing	
PALADIN	1 November 2023	ongoing	
FORTITUDE	1 November 2023	ongoing	
STEADFAST	10 September 2018	ongoing	
LITTEN	31 August 2016; 4 November 2016	21 October 2016 ongoing	
AUGURY	4 July 2014	ongoing	

=== Australian Operational Service Medal – Africa (AOSM-A) ===
The eligibility requirements for this medal are:

- 30 days service, continuous or aggregated, on either of the below operations
- The ADF member is force assigned for operational duties.

The declared operations are:

Operation	From	To	Notes
ASLAN	1 November 2023	ongoing	
ORENDA	1 April 2020	31 December 2023	

=== Australian Operational Service Medal – Indo–Pacific (AOSM-IP) ===
The eligibility requirements for this medal are:

- 30 days service, continuous or aggregated, on either of the below operations
- The ADF member is force assigned for operational duties.

The declared operations are:

Operation	From	To	Notes
GATEWAY	1 July 2005	ongoing	
RENDER SAFE	3 June 2014	ongoing	
SAVILLE	10 November 2014	ongoing	
AUGURY	22 June 2017	1 December 2019	
ARGOS	26 April 2018	ongoing	
LINESMEN	16 April 2019	ongoing	
LILIA	25 November 2021	31 August 2024	

== Clasps for declared operations – Civilian version ==
East Timor clasp on AOSM Civilian ribbon

On 12 December 2012, the Governor-General declared, for the purposes of the Australian Operational Service Medal Regulation 2012, a number of declared operations, and determined the conditions for award of Clasps.

General conditions for all Clasps include

- awarded to a civilian who was employed for duty on the declared operation for a period of not less than an aggregate of 30 days;

Specific conditions for each Clasp include

Theatre	Operation	Declared period		Clasp name	Notes
Theatre	Operation	from	to	Clasp name	Notes
East Timor	TANAGER	20 February 2000	19 May 2002	EAST TIMOR	
East Timor	CITADEL	20 May 2002	19 May 2004	EAST TIMOR	
East Timor	SPIRE	20 May 2004	21 May 2005	EAST TIMOR	
various	SLIPPER	11 October 2001	1 August 2002	ICAT	
various	SLIPPER	11 October 2001	30 July 2009	ICAT	
various	SLIPPER	31 July 2009	19 February 2012	ICAT	
various	SLIPPER	20 February 2012	30 June 2014	ICAT	
Afghanistan	SLIPPER	1 July 2014		ICAT	
various	FALCONER	18 March 2003	22 July 2003	IRAQ 2003	
various	CATALYST	16 July 2003	31 July 2009	IRAQ 2003	
Solomon Islands	ANODE	24 July 2003	1 August 2013	SOLOMON IS II	
Timor-Leste	ASTUTE	12 May 2006	25 May 2013	TIMOR-LESTE	
various	MANITOU	1 July 2014	ongoing	G.M.E. OPS	
various	ACCORDION	1 July 2014	ongoing	G.M.E. OPS	
Various	GATEWAY	1 July 2015	ongoing	INDO-PACIFIC	
Various	RENDER SAFE	3 June 2014	ongoing	INDO-PACIFIC	
Various	SAVILLE	10 November 2014	ongoing	INDO-PACIFIC	
Philippines	AUGURY	22 June 2017	1 December 2019	INDO-PACIFIC	
Korea	ARGOS	26 April 2018	ongoing	INDO-PACIFIC	
South Korea	LINESMEN	16 April 2019	ongoing	INDO-PACIFIC	
Solomon Islands	LILIA	25 November 2021	31 August 2024	INDO-PACIFIC	

== See also ==
- Australian Honours Order of Precedence
- Australian campaign medals
- Australia Service Medal 1939–45
- Australian Active Service Medal 1945–1975
- Australian Active Service Medal
- Australian Service Medal 1945–1975
- Australian Service Medal
- Police Overseas Service Medal (Australia)
- Humanitarian Overseas Service Medal
- National Emergency Medal (Australia)
- Civilian Service Medal 1939–1945
- List of military operations involving Australia

48°00' North Latitude, 35°00' East Longitude	48°00' North Latitude, 81°00' East Longitude
12°00' North Latitude, 35°00' East Longitude	12°00' North Latitude, 81°00' East Longitude

39°N, 32°E	39°N, 78°E
05°S, 32°E	05°S, 78°E

39°N, 32°E			39°N, 78°E
		23°N, 68°E	23°N, 78°E
17°N, 32°E	17°N, 38°E		
	11°S, 38°E	11°S, 68°E	

38°N, 32°E	38°N, 68°E
10°N, 32°E	10°N, 68°E
