= List of Australian campaign medals =

Australian campaign medals are listed in order of precedence as defined in references below. Those campaign medals which have been independently issued by Australia to its armed forces are in bold.

== Second Boer War ==
- Queen's South Africa Medal
- King's South Africa Medal

== World War I ==
- 1914 Star
- 1914–15 Star (Note: Recipients of the 1914 Star are not eligible for the award of the 1914–15 Star, but may be eligible for a Clasp to the 1914 Star.)
- British War Medal
- Mercantile Marine War Medal
- Victory Medal
- Naval General Service Medal 1915–62 (Note: The order of wearing of the Naval General Service Medal 1915–62 and General Service Medal 1918–62 (Army and Air Force) will vary from person to person depending on when the person earned the first clasp. If the first clasp relates to service between World War I and World War II, the medals should be worn immediately after World War I war medals. If the first clasp relates to service after 2 September 1945, the medals should be worn immediately after the United Nations Service Medal for Korea.) (Note: Clasps to these medals should be worn on the ribbon in order of date of receipt.)
- General Service Medal 1918–62

== World War II ==
- 1939–45 Star
- Atlantic Star (Note: Only one of these three Stars could be awarded to an individual. Should a person have qualified for two of these awards, the Star first earned is worn with the Clasp of the second Star. Only one Star and one Clasp may be worn even if the person qualified for all three Stars.)
- Air Crew Europe Star
- Arctic Star
- Africa Star
- Pacific Star (Note: Only one of these two Stars could be awarded to an individual. Should a person have qualified for both the Pacific Star and the Burma Star, the Star first earned was awarded together with the appropriate Clasp denoting the service that would have qualified for the other Star.)
- Burma Star
- Italy Star
- France and Germany Star
- Defence Medal
- War Medal, 1939–45
- **Australia Service Medal 1939–45**

== Post-World War II ==
- **Australian Active Service Medal 1945–1975**
- Korea Medal
- United Nations Service Medal for Korea (Note: Uniquely, although a foreign award, the United Nations Service Medal for Korea is worn immediately after the Korea Medal. All other foreign awards for which official permission has been given to accept and wear are worn as Foreign Awards.)
- Naval General Service Medal 1915–62
- General Service Medal 1918–62
- General Service Medal 1962
- **Vietnam Medal**
- **Vietnam Logistic and Support Medal** (Note: A person who has been awarded the Vietnam Medal, or who is eligible for the award of the Vietnam Medal, is not eligible for the award of the Vietnam Logistic and Support Medal. These medals are of equal status.)
- **Australian Active Service Medal**
- **International Force East Timor Medal** (INTERFET)
- **Afghanistan Medal**
- **Iraq Medal**
- **Australian Service Medal 1945–1975**
- **Australian General Service Medal for Korea**
- **Australian Service Medal**
- **Rhodesia Medal**

== Australian Operational Service Medal ==
NOTE: Worn in order of date of qualifying service. Governor General - Australian Order of Wearing Honours and Awards (Note 9 to Annex 1)

- **Australian Operational Service Medal – Border Protection**
- **Australian Operational Service Medal – Greater Middle East Operation**
- **Australian Operational Service Medal – Special Operations**
- **Australian Operational Service Medal – Counter Terrorism/Special Recovery**
- **Australian Operational Service Medal – Africa**
- **Australian Operational Service Medal – Indo-Pacific**
- **Australian Operational Service Medal – Civilian**

== Foreign awards ==
Foreign awards commonly awarded to Australians for campaign service include:

NATO

- NATO Medal with 'ISAF' clasp for service with the International Security Assistance Force.
- NATO Medal with 'Afghanistan clasp for service in Operation Resolute Support.

United Nations

- UN Medal (UNFICYP, Cyprus)
- United Nations Special Service Medal (Timor Leste 2005–2006 UNOTIL)
- UN Medal (UNIIMOG, Iraq)
- UN Medal (UNTAG, Namibia)
- UN Medal (UNTAC, Cambodia)
- UN Medal (UNTSO, Middle East)
- UN Medal (UNAMIR, Rwanda)
- UN Medal (UNOSOM I, UNOSOM II and UNITAF, Somalia)
- UN Medal (UNTAET, UNTAET and UNMISET, East Timor)
- UN Medal (UNMIS, Sudan)
- UN Medal (UNMISS, South Sudan)

20th Century

- Multinational Force and Observers Medal (Multinational Force and Observers)
- Vietnam Campaign Medal (South Vietnam)
- Kuwait Liberation Medal (Saudi Arabia)
- Kuwait Liberation Medal (Kuwait) – Not Authorised for wear on uniform, only as a keepsake.
- Gulf Medal (United Kingdom) awarded for service with British units.
- Pingat Jasa Malaysia (Malaysia)
- Timor Leste Solidarity Medal (East Timor)
- Southwest Asia Service Medal (United States) for service with US units in Operations Desert Shield or Desert Storm.

JIPTC

- Jordan International Police Training Center Medal JIPTC (Jordan 2003–2007) for training 32,000 members of the post-war Iraqi Police Service in Jordan

21st Century

- Iraq Medal (United Kingdom) awarded for service with British units.
- Ebola Medal for Service in West Africa (United Kingdom)

Permission for formal acceptance and wearing of foreign awards is given by the Governor-General on the recommendation of the Prime Minister or the Minister responsible for Australian honours.

== See also ==
- Australian Honours Order of Precedence
- British campaign medals
- New Zealand campaign medals
