= Australian honours order of wearing =

Positioning of Australian Orders, Decorations and Medals

The Governor-General of Australia publishes the order of wearing of Australian orders, decorations and medals in the Commonwealth of Australia Gazette. The Order of Wearing Australian Honours and Awards was last published in 2007.

== Order of wearing ==
The order of wearing decorations and awards within the Australian honours system is prescribed as follows.

Honours and awards listed are:

- those within the Australian system of honours and awards;
- those conferred by the Sovereign in exercise of the royal prerogative;
- those within the Order of St John; and
- foreign awards the acceptance and wearing of which have been authorised by the Governor-General.

Awards of the United Kingdom issued since 5 October 1992 are classified as foreign and are worn accordingly.

1. Victoria Cross/Victoria Cross for Australia VC
2. Cross of Valour CV
3. Knight/Lady Companion of the Order of the Garter (Note: Conferred by The Sovereign in exercise of the Royal Prerogative) KG/LG
4. Knight/Lady of the Order of the Thistle KT/LT
5. Member of the Order of Merit OM (Civil Division and Military Division)
6. Knight/Dame of the Order of Australia (Note: "Provision for further awards at this level within the Order of Australia was removed by Her Majesty The Queen on 3 March 1986 on the advice of the Prime Minister. The grade was reinstated on 25 March 2014 on the advice of the Prime Minister." Order of Wearing, Page 5, Note 2.) AK/AD
7. Knight/Dame Grand Cross of the Royal Victorian Order GCVO
8. Companion of the Order of Australia (General Division) AC (Military Division)
9. Knight/Dame Commander of the Royal Victorian Order KCVO/DCVO
10. Officer of the Order of Australia (General Division) AO (Military Division)
11. Commander of the Royal Victorian Order CVO
12. Star of Gallantry SG
13. Star of Courage SC
14. Distinguished Service Cross DSC
15. Member of the Order of Australia (General Division) AM (Military Division)
16. Lieutenant of the Royal Victorian Order LVO
17. Member of the Royal Victorian Order MVO
18. Conspicuous Service Cross CSC
19. Nursing Service Cross NSC
20. Medal for Gallantry MG
21. Bravery Medal BM
22. Distinguished Service Medal DSM
23. Public Service Medal PSM
24. Australian Police Medal APM
25. Australian Fire Service Medal AFSM
26. Ambulance Service Medal ASM
27. Emergency Services Medal ESM
28. Australian Corrections Medal (Note: Commonwealth of Australia Gazette Notice C2017G00904 of 18 August 2017 specifies the medal is to be worn immediately after the Emergency Services Medal.) ACM
29. Australian Intelligence Medal (Note: Commonwealth of Australia Gazette Notice C2020G00621 of 31 July 2020 specifies the medal is to be worn immediately after the Australian Corrections Medal.) AIM
30. Medal of the Order of Australia (General Division) OAM (Military Division)
31. Order of St John
32. Conspicuous Service Medal CSM
33. Australian Antarctic Medal AAM
34. Royal Victorian Medal RVM
35. Commendation for Gallantry
36. Commendation for Brave Conduct
37. Commendation for Distinguished Service
38. Australia Service Medal 1939-45
39. Australian Active Service Medal 1945–1975 (Note: Clasps to these medals should be worn on the ribbon in order of date of receipt.)
40. Vietnam Medal
41. Vietnam Logistic and Support Medal (Note: A person who has been awarded the Vietnam Medal, or who is eligible for the award of the Vietnam Medal, is not eligible for the award of the Vietnam Logistic and Support Medal. These medals are of equal status.)
42. Australian Active Service Medal
43. International Force East Timor Medal (INTERFET)
44. Afghanistan Medal
45. Iraq Medal
46. Australian Service Medal 1945–1975
47. Australian General Service Medal for Korea
48. Australian Service Medal
49. Australian Operational Service Medal (Note: 'AOSM's are worn in order of date of qualifying service.' www.defence.gov.au - Order of wearing)
  1. Australian Operational Service Medal – Border Protection
  2. Australian Operational Service Medal – Greater Middle East Operation
  3. Australian Operational Service Medal – Special Operations
  4. Australian Operational Service Medal – Counter Terrorism/Special Recovery
  5. Australian Operational Service Medal – Africa
  6. Australian Operational Service Medal – Indo-Pacific
50. Australian Operational Service Medal – Civilian
51. Rhodesia Medal
52. Police Overseas Service Medal
53. Humanitarian Overseas Service Medal
54. National Emergency Medal (Note: Commonwealth of Australia Gazette No. S169 of Friday, 28 October 2011 specifies the medal is to be worn immediately after the Humanitarian Overseas Service Medal.)
55. Civilian Service Medal 1939–1945
56. National Police Service Medal (Note: Commonwealth of Australia Gazette No. S31 of Thursday, 3 March 2011 specifies the medal is to be worn immediately after the Civilian Service Medal 1939–45.)
57. King Edward VII Coronation Medal
58. King George V Coronation Medal
59. King George V Silver Jubilee Medal
60. King George VI Coronation Medal
61. Queen Elizabeth II Coronation Medal
62. Queen Elizabeth II Silver Jubilee Medal
63. Queen Elizabeth II Golden Jubilee Medal (Note: The Jubilee Medals have been awarded by The Sovereign in exercise of the Royal Prerogative to those awarded the Victoria Cross for Australia and Cross of Valour)
64. Queen Elizabeth II Diamond Jubilee Medal
65. Queen Elizabeth II Platinum Jubilee Medal
66. King Charles III Coronation Medal
67. 80th Anniversary Armistice Remembrance Medal
68. Australian Sports Medal
69. Centenary Medal
70. Defence Force Service Medal
71. Reserve Force Decoration RFD
72. Reserve Force Medal
73. Defence Long Service Medal
74. National Medal
75. Australian Defence Medal
76. Australian Cadet Forces Service Medal
77. Champion Shots Medal
78. Long Service Medals (Note: Includes Imperial efficiency and long service awards) (see United Kingdom honours order of wearing)
79. Service Medal of the Order of St John
80. Anniversary of National Service 1951–1972 Medal
81. Foreign Awards (in order of date of authorisation of their acceptance and wearing).

== Citations ==
The following citations are not positioned according to the list above. For members of the uniformed services, they are worn according to respective Service dress rules. For civilians, they are worn centrally above any other honours or awards:

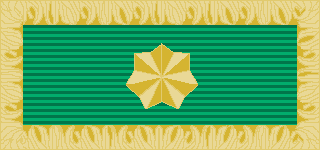
- Unit Citation for Gallantry
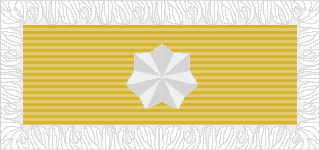
- Meritorious Unit Citation
- Group Bravery Citation

== Foreign awards ==
Approved foreign awards are published by the Governor-General in the Schedule of Approved Countries and Awards.

The following are the only foreign honours authorised to be accepted by Australians.

Authorised as of 8 May 2024
Country	Award	Ribbon
Afghanistan	Medal of Honour National Police of Afghanistan	
Afghanistan	Ghazi Mir Bacha Khan Medal	
Argentina	Order of May	
Argentina	Order of the Liberator General San Martín	
Austria	Austrian Decoration for Science and Art	
Austria	Austrian Olympic Medal 1976	
Austria	Decoration of Honour for Services to the Republic of Austria	
Austria	Decoration of Honour for Services to the State of Vienna	
Austria	Decoration of Merit in Gold or Silver of the Republic of Austria	
Austria	Distinguished Service Order in Gold of the Republic of Austria	
Austria	Ehrenzeichen des Landes Kärnten	
Austria	Medal for Services to the Republic of Austria	
Austria	Merit Badge of the Republic of Austria	
Bangladesh	Gallantry medals ('Bir' awards)	
Belgium	Civic Decoration	
Belgium	Commemorative Medal of the 1940–1945 War	
Belgium	Labour Decoration	
Belgium	Military Decoration	
Belgium	Order of Leopold	
Belgium	Order of Leopold II	
Belgium	Order of the Crown	
Belgium	Queen Elisabeth Medal	
Belgium	Medal of the Armed Resistance 1940–1945	
Belgium	Royal Order of the Lion	
Belgium	War Cross (First World War)	
Belgium	War Cross (Second World War)	
Belgium	War Cross (1954–present)	
Brazil	Order of the Southern Cross	
Brazil	Order of Rio Branco	
Brunei	Coronation Medal	
Brunei	Campaign Medal	
Brunei	The Most Blessed Order of Loyalty to the State of Brunei	
Brunei	The Most Distinguished Order of Merit of Brunei	
Brunei	The Most Honourable Order of the Crown of Brunei	
Brunei	Excellent Service Medal	
Brunei	Meritorious Service Medal	
Bulgaria	Order of the Madara Konnik	
Cambodia	Medal of Labour	
Cambodia	National Construction Medal	
Cambodia	Royal Order of Cambodia	
Cambodia	Royal Order of Sahametrei	
Cambodia	Royal Order of Sowathara	
Canada	General Campaign Star (With ISAF clasp)	
Canada	Meritorious Service Cross	
Canada	Meritorious Service Medal	
Canada	Star of Courage	
Canada	125th Anniversary of the Confederation of Canada Medal	
Chile	Order of Bernardo O'Higgins	
Chile	Order of Merit	
Chile	Victory Cross	
Taiwan	Order of Brilliant Star	

== See also ==
- Orders, decorations, and medals of Australia
- Post-nominal letters
- List of post-nominal letters (Australia)
- Australian Commendations and Citations
- United Kingdom Honours Order of Wearing
