= Iraq Medal (Australia) =

- Obverse (left), reverse (right) and ribbon (bottom) of the medal
- Type: Campaign Medal
- Awarded for: Service on Operation Falconer, Catalyst, Riverbank or Kruger
- Presented by: Australia
- Eligibility: recognises service of Australian Defence Force personnel in designated operations in the Iraq region from 18 March 2003
- Campaign: Iraq War
- Status: Closed - last issued in 2011 to a member of the SECDET XVIII (CPP Team) at the Al Minhad Air Base.
- Established: 30 September 2004

Highlights
- Total: 16,828 as of 30 June 2010

Order of Wear
- Next (higher): Afghanistan Medal
- Next (lower): Australian Service Medal 1945–1975
- Related: Australian Active Service Medal

The Iraq Medal was instituted by Queen Elizabeth II, Queen of Australia on the advice of the Australian Prime Minister John Howard in 2004. The Iraq Medal is awarded to Australian Defence Force (ADF) personnel who served in or around Iraq (19 March 2003 – 25 November 2013) during the Iraq War. ADF personnel are also recognised by the 'IRAQ 2003' clasp to the Australian Active Service Medal.

== Eligibility ==
Members of the ADF who render service with the forces known as:

- Operation Falconer – the ADF contribution to the United States led military operations to remove the threat of Iraqi weapons of mass destruction that:
  - commenced on 18 March 2003 and ended on 30 April 2003, with 7 days service in the specified areas comprising the total land areas, territorial waters, inland waterways and superjacent airspace boundaries of Iraq, Kuwait, Bahrain, Qatar, United Arab Emirates Oman, Saudi Arabia, Jordan Yemen, the Persian Gulf the Strait of Hormuz, the Gulf of Oman, those portions of the Arabian Sea bounded by 68 degrees East and 12 degrees North the Gulf of Aden, the Bab el Mandeb, the Red Sea, the Gulf of Suez and the Gulf of Aqaba;
  - commenced on 1 May 2003 and ended on 22 July 2003, with 30 days service in the specified areas comprising the total land areas, territorial waters, inland waterways and superjacent airspace boundaries of Iraq, Kuwait, Bahrain, Qatar, United Arab Emirates, Saudi Arabia north of 23 degrees North, the Persian Gulf and the Strait of Hormuz.
- Operation Catalyst the ADF contribution to the United States led coalition operations in Iraq to support the Australian effort to assist with the rehabilitation of Iraq and remove the threat of weapons of mass destruction that commenced on 16 July 2003 and ended on 31 July 2009, for 30 days service in the specified areas comprising the total land areas, territorial waters, inland waterways and superjacent airspace boundaries of Iraq Kuwait, Bahrain, Qatar United Arab Emirates, Saudi Arabia north of 23 degrees North, the Persian Gulf and the Strait of Hormuz.
- Operation Riverbank from 21 July 2008 personnel attached to the United Nations Assistance Mission for Iraq as part of Operation Riverbank. The operation ended on 25 November 2013.
- Operation Kruger from 1 January 2009 personnel deployed on Operation KRUGER as part of the Security Detachment Iraq which protects the Australian embassy in Baghdad. The operation ended in late July 2011.

== Description ==
- The Iraq Medal is a cupro-nickel circular medal. The obverse features the Commonwealth Coat of Arms.
- The reverse has a processional lion, which is copied from a relief on the Gateway of the Temple of Ishtar in Babylon. In the Assyrian Empire, the lion was a dominant symbol of power. The lion stands on a narrow plinth, symbolising balance, with the word 'IRAQ' inscribed underneath.
- The ribbon is sand yellow representing the desert sands of Iraq, with central stripes of purple and red representing the ADF and the conflict in Iraq.

== See also ==
- Australian Honours System
- Australian campaign medals
- Australian Honours Order of Precedence
