= Australian Commendations and Citations =

Commendation's
- Type: Commendation
- Presented by: Australia
- Eligibility: Members of the Australian Defence Force and the Australian Defence Force Cadets.
- Status: Currently awarded

Australian Commendations are awards of recognition which all Department of Defence personnel are eligible; including both Defence Members and the Australian Public Service (APS). The Scheme provides a means to formally recognise outstanding/exceptional achievement, or specific acts of bravery for which awards from within the Australian Honours System are not an appropriate medium of recognition. The circumstances attracting the award of a commendation may relate to an isolated instance or to a series of instances over a period of time.

== National Commendations ==
- Commendation for Gallantry
- Commendation for Brave Conduct
- Commendation for Distinguished Service

== Australian Defence Force Commendations ==
- Secretary/Chief of Defence Force Joint Commendation
- Secretary of Defence Commendation
- Chief of Defence Force Commendation
- Defence Support Services Commendation (Gold, Silver & Bronze)
- Australian Defence Force Commendation (Gold, Silver & Bronze)
- Navy Commendation (Gold, Silver & Bronze)
- Army Commendation (Gold, Silver & Bronze)
- Air Force Commendation (Gold, Silver & Bronze)

== Australian Defence Force Cadets Commendations ==
- Director General Australian Navy Cadets Commendation
- National Commander Australian Navy Cadets Commendation (Gold, Silver & Bronze)
- Commander - Australian Army Cadets Commendation (Gold)
- Deputy Commander - Australian Army Cadets Commendation (Silver)
- Regional Commander - Australian Army Cadets Commendation (Bronze)
- Director General Cadets - Air Force Commendation (Bronze)
- Commander - Australian Air Force Cadets Commendation (Silver)

== Description ==
Commendations come in three grades (Gold, Silver & Bronze) of which Gold is the highest and Bronze is the lowest.

== See also ==
- Australian Honours System
- Australian Honours Order of Precedence
