= Australian Corrections Medal =

Award for distinguished service in the Australian correctional service

- medal (front)
- Type: Meritorious Service Medal
- Awarded for: Distinguished Service
- Presented by: Governor-General of Australia
- Eligibility: A Correctional service member who is employed or engaged by a correctional service, or by an entity that is authorised to perform functions for a correctional service.
- Post-nominals: ACM
- Status: Currently awarded
- Established: 19 June 2017
- First award: 2018 Australia Day Honours
- Final award: 2025 Australia Day Honours

Highlights
- Total: 290
- Ribbon of the medal

Order of Wear
- Next (higher): Emergency Services Medal (ESM)
- Next (lower): Australian Intelligence Medal (AIM)

The Australian Corrections Medal (ACM) is a civil decoration awarded to Australian correctional service members for distinguished service. The ACM was introduced on 19 June 2017. Recipients of the Australian Corrections Medal are entitled to use the post-nominal letters "ACM".

Awards are made by the Governor-General, on the nomination of the responsible minister in each state or territory, and at the federal level. The total number of awards made each year must not exceed the following quota:

- One medal for every 1000 full-time members, or 1000 part-time members of a state or territory correctional service.

== Description ==
The medal is a circular nickel-silver medal. The obverse features the Federation Star bearing the scales of justice surrounded by a wreath of Australian wattle. The reverse of the medal is inscribed with the recipient's name surrounded by another wreath of Australian wattle. The suspension bar has 'Corrections' written on the obverse side only with the back remaining blank.

The ribbon is 32 mm (1.3 in) wide and features a central band of blue flanked by white and mustard green stripes.

== See also ==
- Australian Honours Order of Precedence
