= Australian General Service Medal for Korea =

- Obverse (left), reverse (right) and ribbon (bottom) of the medal
- Type: Campaign medal
- Awarded for: Service in operations in South Korea during the post-Armistice period.
- Presented by: Australia
- Status: Currently issued
- Established: 24 November 2009
- Final award: 23 January 2014

Order of Wear
- Next (higher): Australian Service Medal 1945–1975
- Next (lower): Australian Service Medal

The Australian General Service Medal for Korea (AGSMK) recognises former defence force personnel who completed 30 days of service in operations in South Korea, including any location 161 km (100 mi) seaward from the coast of South Korea, during the post-Armistice period, 28 July 1953 to 19 April 1956. The medal was established by letters patent by Queen Elizabeth II on 24 November 2009 and further determination approved by the Governor General on 12 March 2010. The AGSMK was announced on 12 February 2010 by the Parliamentary Secretary for Defence Support, the Hon Dr Mike Kelly AM MP, following the recommendations of the 2005 Post-Armistice Korean Service Review.

== Description ==
The AGSMK is a circular nickel-silver medal 38mm in diameter ensigned with the Federation Star. The obverse has a central design of a relief map of South Korea superimposed over polar projection lines representing the United Nations and surrounded by the words Australian General Service Medal Korea. Centred on the reverse are the words Post Armistice Service 1953–1956 surrounded by Australian gum leaves and blossoms with two Federation Stars included in the bottom left and right hand quadrants. The medal has an antique silver finish with a raised polished outer edge. The medal ribbon is 32 millimetres wide and has a central yellow stripe 8mm wide, flanked by 6mm stripes of blue, which in turn are flanked by 6mm stripes white. The ribbon colours are representative of the colours used for the Korea Medal and the United Nations Korea Medal.

The ribbon bar consists of a strip of full-sized ribbon with no emblem.

== Order of wear ==
The AGSMK is placed immediately after the Australian Service Medal 1945–1975 in the Order of Wearing Australian Honours and Awards.

== See also ==
- Australian campaign medals
- Australian Honours Order of Precedence
- Korea Medal
- United Nations Korea Medal
- Australian Service Medal 1945–1975
