= Emergency Services Medal =

- Obverse of medal and ribbon
- Type: Medal
- Awarded for: distinguished service
- Presented by: Governor-General of Australia
- Eligibility: members of Australian emergency services
- Post-nominals: ESM
- Status: Currently awarded
- Established: 7 July 1999
- First award: 2000 Queen's Birthday Honours
- Final award: 2025 Australia Day Honours

Highlights
- Total: 736

Order of Wear
- Next (higher): Ambulance Service Medal (ASM)
- Next (lower): Australian Corrections Medal (ACM)

The Emergency Services Medal (ESM) is awarded for distinguished service by a member of an Australian emergency service, and people who are involved in emergency management, training or education. The medal was introduced in 1999, and recipients are entitled to use the post-nominal letters "ESM". The Emergency Services Medal is considered to be among the highest honours available to Emergency Services personnel.

Awards are made by the Governor-General, on the nomination of the responsible minister in each state or territory, and at the federal level. The total number of awards made each year must not exceed the following quota:

- One medal for every 1000 full-time members, or part of 1000, full-time members of the emergency service (or combined emergency services) of each state.
- One medal for every 5000, or part of 5000 part-time, volunteer or auxiliary members of the emergency service (or combined emergency services).
- One medal may be awarded in each of the Australian Capital Territory, the Northern Territory and the combined External Territories.

== Description ==
- The central motif on the obverse of the Emergency Services Medal is a raised equilateral triangle with beveled edges. This is bordered by stylised sprays of wattle. The centre of the triangle features a raised impression of the Federation Star that is surrounded by twenty-four balls. The balls represent the twenty-four hours per day the Emergency Service is available to the community.
- The reverse has the inscription ‘For Distinguished Service’.
- The medal has silver and bronze colouring.
- The 32 millimetre-wide ribbon features a centre band of an orange and white checkerboard pattern, flanked on each outer edge by a royal blue band. .

== See also ==
Australian Honours Order of Precedence
