= Australian Intelligence Medal =

- Type: Meritorious Service Medal
- Awarded for: Distinguished Service
- Description: medal (front)
- Presented by: Governor-General of Australia
- Eligibility: A member of the National Intelligence Community.
- Post-nominals: AIM
- Status: Currently awarded
- Established: 24 January 2020
- First award: 2021 Australia Day Honours
- Final award: 2025 Australia Day Honours

Highlights
- Total: 48
- Ribbon of the medal

Order of Wear
- Next (higher): Australian Corrections Medal (ACM)
- Next (lower): Medal of the Order of Australia (OAM)

The Australian Intelligence Medal (AIM) is a civil decoration awarded to national intelligence community members for distinguished service. The decoration was introduced on 24 January 2020. Recipients of the Australian Intelligence Medal are entitled to use the post-nominal letters "AIM". Awards are made by the governor-general of Australia on the nomination of the Australian Intelligence Medal Committee.

== Description ==
The medal is a bi-metal construction of nickel-silver in antique finish and bronze colouring in a circular shape 38 millimetres in diameter. The obverse of the medal features a raised Federation Star. The centre of the Federation Star has a bronze-coloured raised impression of a decagon, symbolising the ten agencies of the National Intelligence Community. The Federation Star is surrounded by an indented border, representing the twenty-four-hour nature of intelligence. The central emblem is encircled by a contemporary laurel of a wattle which recalls the uniquely Australian nature of the award. The reverse features a border with the raised, polished words ‘Australian Intelligence Medal’ surrounding a space where the recipient's name may be engraved.

The ribbon is 32 mm (1.3 in) wide and features a central band of yellow 5 millimetres in width, flanked by white graduating to midnight blue then to black.

== Eligibility ==
Awards are made by the Governor-General, on the nomination of the Australian Intelligence Medal Committee. The total number of awards made each year must not exceed the following quota:

- One medal for every 1000 members, or part of 1000 members plus one additional medal.
- Covid-19 related work is an exception to the quota.

The National Intelligence Community consists of ten organisations, with the head of each along with the secretary of the Department of the Prime Minister and Cabinet forming the Australian Intelligence Medal Committee.

The eligible organisations are:

- Australian Criminal Intelligence Commission (ACIC)
- Australian Federal Police (AFP)
- Australian Geospatial-Intelligence Organisation (AGO)
- Australian Security Intelligence Organisation (ASIO)
- Australian Secret Intelligence Service (ASIS)
- Australian Signals Directorate (ASD)
- Australian Transaction Reports and Analysis Centre (AUSTRAC)
- Defence Intelligence Organisation (DIO)
- Department of Home Affairs (DHA)
- Office of National Intelligence (ONI)

== Notable recipients ==
Avril Haines, the Director of National Intelligence (United States) was awarded the medal as part of the 2024 King's Birthday Honours for "distinguished service to the National Intelligence Community."

== See also ==
- Australian Honours Order of Precedence
