= International Force East Timor Medal =

International Force East Timor Medal (INTERFET Medal)
- Obverse (left), reverse (right) and ribbon (bottom) of medal
- Type: Campaign Medal
- Awarded for: Service
- Description: Circular nickel silver medal
- Presented by: Australia
- Eligibility: INTERFET contributing countries personnel in East Timor
- Established: 25 March 2000

Highlights
- Total: 8,696 to Australians; 6,356 to Foreigners

Order of Wear
- Next (higher): Australian Active Service Medal
- Next (lower): Afghanistan Medal
- Related: Australian Active Service Medal

The International Force East Timor (INTERFET) Medal recognises members of the Australian Defence Force who served for 30 days (or 30 sorties) in East Timor during the INTERFET campaign (16 September 1999 – 10 April 2000). The qualifying area comprises East Timor and the sea adjacent to East Timor out to a distance of 12 nautical miles (22 km) from the low water mark.

Australian Defence Force personnel are also recognised by the 'East Timor' clasp to the Australian Active Service Medal. Australia has also offered this medal to the other 16 nations who participated in the INTERFET operation.

== Description ==
- The nickel silver medal is surmounted by a connector piece, which features a raised Federation Star.
- The obverse depicts the outline of a dove holding an olive branch, as a symbol of peace. This outline is raised in polished white silver and is superimposed on a textured map of East Timor and Territories. 'INTERNATIONAL FORCE EAST TIMOR' is inscribed on the inside of the medal rim.
- The medal reverse features the wording 'TOGETHER AS ONE FOR PEACE IN EAST TIMOR'.
- The 32 millimetre-wide has a central red stripe, flanked by stripes of green, white and pale blue. The white, green and blue stripes represent the Navy, Army and Air Force, with dual representation of white for peace, blue for the sea surrounding East Timor and green for the regrowth of a new nation. The central red stripe represents the turbulent past of East Timor.

== See also ==
- Australian Honours Order of Precedence
- Australian campaign medals
