= Edward Kenna =

Australian soldier and Victoria Cross recipient

Edward Kenna VC
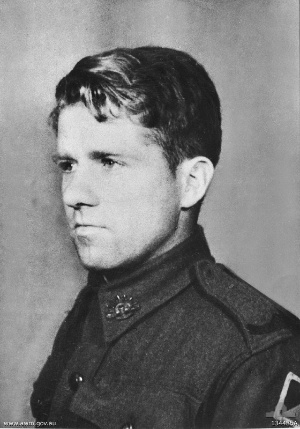
- Ted Kenna during his military service
- Born: 6 July 1919; Hamilton, Victoria
- Died: 8 July 2009 (aged 90); Geelong, Victoria
- Military career
- Allegiance: Australia
- Branch: Australian Army
- Service years: 1940–1946
- Rank: Private
- Nickname: Ted
- Unit: 2/4th Australian Infantry Battalion
- Conflicts: Second World War; South West Pacific theatre; New Guinea Campaign
- Awards: Victoria Cross

Edward Kenna, VC (6 July 1919 – 8 July 2009) was an Australian soldier and recipient of the Victoria Cross, the highest decoration for gallantry "in the face of the enemy" that can be awarded to members of the British and Commonwealth armed forces. Before his death, he was the last surviving Australian to have been awarded a Victoria Cross during the Second World War.

== Second World War ==
Kenna served in the Citizen Military Forces from August 1940 and was allotted service number V55955. In December 1941, the Citizens Military Force was called up for full-time service for the duration of the war. In June 1942, Kenna volunteered for the Second Australian Imperial Force and was allotted new service number VX102142. He served in the 23rd/21st Battalion in Victoria and later in the Darwin area. In June 1943, his unit returned to Victoria before being sent to Queensland. At this point, the unit was disbanded and its members allotted as reinforcements to other units. Kenna was assigned to the 2/4th Battalion and embarked for New Guinea in October 1944.

=== Victoria Cross action ===
The citation for his VC was gazetted on 6 September 1945, and read:

War Office, 6th September, 1945.

The KING has been graciously pleased to approve the award of the VICTORIA CROSS to:-

No. VX.102142 Private Edward KENNA, 2/4 Australian Infantry Battalion, Australian Military Forces.

In the South West Pacific at Wewak on 15th May, 1945, during the attack on the Wirui Mission features, Private Kenna's company had the task of capturing certain enemy positions. The only position from which observation for supporting fire could be obtained was continuously swept by enemy heavy machine gun fire and it was not possible to bring Artillery or Mortars into action.

Private Kenna's platoon was ordered forward to deal with the enemy machine gun post, so that the company operation could proceed. His section moved as close as possible to the bunker in order to harass any enemy seen, so that the remainder of the platoon could attack from the flank. When the attacking sections came into view of the enemy they were immediately engaged at very close range by heavy automatic fire from a position not previously disclosed. Casualties were suffered and the attackers could not move further forward.

Private Kenna endeavoured to put his Bren gun into a position where he could engage the bunker, but was unable to do so because of the nature of the ground. On his own initiative and without orders Private Kenna immediately stood up in full view of the enemy less than fifty yards away and engaged the bunker, firing his Bren gun from the hip. The enemy machine gun immediately returned Private Kenna's fire and with such accuracy that bullets actually passed between his arms and his body. Undeterred, he remained completely exposed and continued to fire at the enemy until his magazine was exhausted. Still making a target of himself, Private Kenna discarded his Bren gun and called for a rifle. Despite the intense machine gun fire, he seized the rifle and, with amazing coolness, killed the gunner with his first round.

A second automatic opened fire on Private Kenna from a different position and another of the enemy immediately tried to move into position behind the first machine gun, but Private Kenna remained standing and killed him with his next round.

The result of Private Kenna's magnificent bravery in the face of concentrated fire, was that the bunker was captured without further loss, and the company attack proceeded to a successful conclusion, many enemy being killed and numerous automatic weapons captured.

There is no doubt that the success of the company attack would have been seriously endangered and many casualties sustained but for Private Kenna's magnificent courage and complete disregard for his own safety. His action was an outstanding example of the highest degree of bravery.

Three weeks later he was shot in the mouth and spent more than a year in hospital before being discharged from the AIF in December 1946. The following year he married Marjorie Rushberry, a nurse who had cared for him at Heidelberg Military Hospital.

Interviewed about his VC action for the Australians at War Film Archive in 2002, Kenna said:

It's just one of those things that you do, I suppose. It's hard to say. I think anyone would have done the same thing in the same position because, well it's no good laying down there and doing nothing. You had to do something and I don't think the Nips would have brought tea or dinner for me so I had to get up and do something and I honestly think that any soldier would have done the same thing.

— Caulfield (ed), Voices of War p254

== Later life ==
After his discharge from hospital, Kenna returned to Hamilton, Victoria. The people of the Hamilton district raised sufficient funds to build Kenna and his wife a house. The Kennas had four children. After the war he worked with the local council and played Australian rules football for the local team. He attended many Victoria Cross reunions in London and led the annual Anzac Day march in Melbourne. In the 1980s Kenna had his portrait painted by Sir William Dargie and in July 2000 he was featured on a postage stamp as part of an issue commemorating Australia's living Victoria Cross winners.

Before his death in 2009, two days after his 90th birthday, Kenna was the last living Australian VC recipient of the Second World War, and one of only two Australian living recipients of the Victoria Cross; the other being Keith Payne, who was awarded his VC during the Vietnam War. (Mark Donaldson, who received a Victoria Cross for Australia, was also living.)

Kenna's Victoria Cross was on display at the Australian War Memorial in Canberra for a period in 2010. His family later decided to sell his medals, including the VC, at an auction held at Dallas Brooks Hall in July 2011. Kenna's medal group was sold for a record high A$1,002,000 to an unknown buyer.

In 2013, a bronze statue of Kenna by sculptor Peter Corlett was unveiled in his hometown of Hamilton, Victoria.
