= Australian Active Service Medal =

- Obverse of medal (with East Timor clasp) and ribbon
- Type: Campaign medal
- Awarded for: Service in prescribed warlike operations
- Presented by: Australia
- Established: 13 September 1988

Highlights
- Total: 62,210 as at 30 June 2010

Order of Wear
- Next (higher): Australian Active Service Medal 1945–1975
- Next (lower): International Force East Timor Medal (INTERFET)
- Related: Australian Active Service Medal 1945–1975

The Australian Active Service Medal (AASM) is an Australian military decoration. It was authorised on 13 September 1988 to recognise prescribed service in "warlike" operations, backdated to February 1975. It is awarded with a clasp to denote the prescribed operation and subsequent awards of the medal are made in the form of additional clasps. In 2012, it was announced that the medal would no longer be issued for future operations, with the AASM and the Australian Service Medal being replaced by the Australian Operational Service Medal.

== Description ==
The AASM is a circular nickel-silver medal ensigned with the Crown of St Edward. The obverse has a Federation Star within a wreath of mimosa and bears a laurel wreath surrounding the inscription 'FOR ACTIVE SERVICE'.

The medal ribbon is 32 millimetres wide and has a central red stripe to symbolise the danger of warlike operations. It is flanked by stripes of silver-green which in turn are flanked by stripes of light green, gold, dark green and brown.

The ribbon bar consists of a strip of full-sized ribbon with no emblem.

== AASM Afghanistan 2015–2021 Debate ==
Veterans and current serving ADF personnel have proposed that a new AASM be issued incorporating clasps for warlike operations in Afghanistan (ICAT), Syria and Iraq. In 2015, the AASM ceased being issued by the Australian Government and was replaced by the Operational Service medal (OSM). Unlike the AASM, the OSM for Middle East deployments does not distinguish between the active and warlike service of deployed personnel serving in Afghanistan, Iraq and Syria, compared with support personnel serving in places such as the UAE who receive the same medal as personnel service on warlike operations. Alternately the current AASM could be issued for active service in those countries, with clasps for ICAT, Iraq and Syria.

This has caused concern to personnel who believe a new AASM should be issued alongside the OSM to recognise warlike service of those operations, including the AASM for service in Afghanistan from 2015 to the evacuation in 2021.

== Clasps ==
The following clasps were authorised for issue with the AASM:

=== Balkans ===
1 day of service (or 1 sortie) with the United Nations (UNPROFOR, UNMIBH, UNCRO, UNPREDEP, UNTAES) or North Atlantic Treaty Organisation (NATO) peacekeeping activities in the former Yugoslavia between 12 January 1992 and 24 January 1997.

=== Cambodia ===
1 day of service (or 1 sortie) with the United Nations Transitional Authority in Cambodia (UNTAC) from 20 October 1991 to 7 October 1993.

=== East Timor ===
1 day of service (or 1 sortie) with the:
- United Nations Assistance Mission in East Timor (UNAMET), Operation Faber, from 16 September 1999 to 23 February 2000.
- ADF contribution to the International Force for East Timor (INTERFET), Operation Warden, from 16 September 1999 to 10 April 2000.

See also INTERFET Medal.

- UN mandated International Force for East Timor (INTERFET), Operation Stabilise, from 16 September 1999 to 23 February 2000.
- United Nations Transitional Administration in East Timor (UNTAET), Operation Tanager, from 20 February 2000 to 19 May 2002.
- United Nations Mission of Support to East Timor (UNMISET), Operation Citadel, from 20 May 2002 to 17 August 2003.

=== ICAT ===
1 day of service (or 1 sortie) as part of the International Coalition Against Terror:
- with the ADF contribution deployed overseas to the United States-led military response to international terrorism, Operation Slipper, from 11 October 2001 to 5 December 2002, and from 1 January 2009 to the present.
- in Diego Garcia (for 30 days/30 sorties) from 11 October 2001 to 1 August 2002.
- as part of the ADF Support to the United Nations Assistance Mission in Afghanistan, Operation Palate, from 18 April 2003 to 4 July 2004.
- as part of the ADF Support to the United Nations Assistance Mission in Afghanistan, Operation Palate II, from 27 June 2005 to the 10 March 2017.

See also Afghanistan Medal.

=== Iraq ===
1 day of service (or 1 sortie) in the area comprising Iraq for service as a member of the ADF assigned for service to:
- Operation Jural with the United Kingdom elements of the coalition force from 30 June 1991 to 12 January 2003.
- Operation Provide Comfort with the United States elements of the coalition force from 11 August 1991 to 15 December 1996.
- Operation Bolton with the United Kingdom elements of the coalition force from 31 August 1992 to 12 January 2003.
- Operation Southern Watch with the United States elements of the coalition force from 31 August 1992 to 12 January 2003.
- Operation Northern Watch with the United States elements of the coalition force from 1 January 1997 to 12 January 2003.

=== Iraq 2003 ===
1 day of service (or 1 sortie) in the Middle East Area as part of the:
- ADF contribution deployed overseas to the United States-led military coalition operations to remove the threat of Iraqi weapons of mass destruction, Operation Falconer, from 18 March 2003 to 22 July 2003.
- ADF participation in United States-led coalition in Iraq, to support the effort to assist with the rehabilitation of Iraq, and to remove the threat posed to world security by Iraq's weapons of mass destruction capability, Operation Catalyst, from 16 July 2003 to 31 July 2009.
- ADF participation to the United Nations Assistance Mission for Iraq, Operation Riverbank, from 21 July 2008.
- ADF participation to the provision of security in Iraq, Operation Kruger, from 1 January 2009.

See also Iraq Medal.

=== Kuwait ===
Service with the multinational deployment in the Persian Gulf from 17 January 1991 to 28 February 1991.
Service on HMAS Canberra during Operation Damask VI from 13–19 January 1993.

=== Middle East ===
Service of 1 or more days with the United Nations Truce Supervision Organization (UNTSO) in southern Lebanon from 12 July 2006 to 14 August 2006.

=== Namibia ===
30 days of service with the United Nations Transitional Assistance Group (UNTAG) from 18 February 1989 to 10 April 1990.

=== Rwanda ===
1 day of service with the United Nations Assistance Mission for Rwanda, Operation Tamar, from 25 July 1994 to 8 March 1996.

=== Sierra Leone ===
Service of 1 or more days with the International Military Advisory and Training Team or attached to British forces involved in Operation Husky from 15 January 2001 to 28 February 2003.

=== Somalia ===
1 day of service (or 1 sortie) with the:
- Battalion Group for Operation Solace as a part of UNOSOM I from 10 January 1993 to 21 May 1993.
- Naval Component for Operation Solace from 10 January 1993 to 21 May 1993.
- Land components of the United Nations Operation in Somalia II from 1 May 1993 to 28 March 1995.
- Air components of the United Nations Operation in Somalia II from 1 May 1993 to 28 March 1995.

=== Vietnam 1975 ===
1 day of service associated with RAAF activities with Transport Support Flight Butterworth or HQ Richmond Detachment 'S' to UNICEF, from 29 March 1975 to 28 April 1975.

== Returned from Active Service Badge ==
Recipients of the Australian Active Service Medal are also entitled to the issue of the Returned from Active Service Badge (RASB).

The RASB is the only campaign service badge awarded post-World War II. It is worn on the left lapel and only in civilian attire, to reflect that the recipient has been involved in warlike service. The brass badge has a serial number with a prefix denoting the member's service, and has been awarded since 1945 where the only change to its appearance has been the replacement of the King George VI's crown with that of the Queen Elizabeth's.

Unlike most awards, the RASB is not issued to deceased members or the next-of-kin, as the badge represents a return from the member's warlike service. The replacement of the AASM with the Operational Service Medal was announced in May 2012; as a result, the RASB has been retired with the AASM, with the Operational Service Badge filling the role of being a badge indicative of a members' warlike service.

== Related medals ==
A separate campaign medal in the Australian system is awarded for major operations and wars, and several – such as the Afghanistan Medal and the Iraq Medal – were issued concurrently with the AASM. These are referenced under their respective clasps, such as the "ICAT" clasp. Personnel who received this medal may also be entitled to receive a service or campaign medal from an international organisation or the host country – such as the NATO Medal – if they meet the eligibility criteria for those medals. These are treated as foreign medals in the Australian system, and if approved for wear on service uniforms, are worn after Australian medals in the order they are received. Recipients of the ASM may be authorised to wear two or three further medals for the same period of service; an Australian campaign medal, a medal from an international organisation and a medal from a host nation. Some of the international and host nation medals have been granted a blanket authority for all recipients to wear. Others are approved on an individual basis.

== See also ==
- Australian campaign medals
- Australian Honours Order of Precedence
- Gulf War Military Awards
- United Nations Medal
- List of United Nations peacekeeping missions
