= Australian Service Medal =

- Obverse (left), reverse (right) and ribbon (bottom) of medal with SINAI clasp
- Type: Campaign Medal
- Awarded for: Service in non-warlike operations
- Presented by: Australia
- Eligibility: Australian Defence Force personnel
- Status: Active
- Established: 13 September 1988

Highlights
- Total: 38,681 as at 30 June 2010

Order of Wear
- Next (higher): Australian General Service Medal for Korea
- Next (lower): Rhodesia Medal
- Related: Australian Service Medal 1945–1975

The Australian Service Medal is an Australian military decoration. It was authorised 13 September 1988 to recognise prescribed service in peacekeeping and non-warlike operations. It is awarded with a clasp to denote the prescribed operation and subsequent awards of the medal are made in the form of additional clasps. The Australian Service Medal 1945–1975 recognises non-warlike service prior to 17 September 1975.

== Description ==
- The Australian Service Medal is a nickel-silver medal ensigned with the Crown of St Edward. The obverse features a modified shield of the Commonwealth Coat of Arms surmounted by the Australian Defence Force Joint Service emblem superimposed on meridians of longitude.
- The reverse of the medal shows clusters of mimosa blossoms surrounding a Federation Star with the inscription "For Service" in capital letters.
- The medal ribbon is 32mm wide and has a central brown stripe symbolising the earth. It is flanked by two stripes of dark green which in turn are flanked by stripes of light green, gold and silver-green.
- A nickel-silver clasp with the name of the theatre or action for which the award is made is presented with the medal.

== Related medals ==
Personnel who receive this medal may also be entitled to receive a service or campaign medal from an international organisation or the host country, if they meet the eligibility criteria for those medals. These are treated as foreign medals in the Australian system, and if approved for wear on service uniforms, are worn after Australian medals in the order they are received. Recipients of the ASM may be authorised to wear up to two further medals from an international organisation and a host nation for the same period of service.

Some of these medals have been granted a blanket authority for all recipients to wear. Others are approved on an individual basis.

== Clasps ==
The following clasps were issued:

=== Balkans ===
30 days service with the United Nations or North Atlantic Treaty Organization (Operation OSIER) in the Balkans region with effect from 25 January 1997 – 16 April 2012

=== Bougainville ===
30 days service with the Truce Monitoring Group in Bougainville (Operations BEL ISI I and II) with effect from 20 November 1997 – 26 August 2003

=== Cambodia ===
30 days service in Cambodia with the United Nations Military Liaison Team/Cambodian Mine Action Centre from 8 October 1993 – 4 October 1999

=== CT/SR ===
60 days continuous/consecutive service:
- in a Tactical Assault Group or Recovery Force with effect from 31 August 1979 until 31 October 2020.
- assigned to Operation Bursa, in the Bass Strait, from 1980 until 1990, including Australian Army, Royal Australian Air Force and Royal Australian Navy personnel assigned to aviation units supporting the operation. Eligible service for aviation personnel consists of service with a unit assigned to the operation, on a reduced notice-to-move, for both aircrew and maintenance personnel.

Note: Replaced by the Australian Operational Service Medal - Counter Terrorism/Special Recovery from 1 November 2020.

=== East Timor ===
30 days service for:
- Humanitarian (Operation FABER) 30 August 1975 – 30 October 1975
- United Nations Assistance Mission in East Timor (UNAMET) 19 June 1999 – 15 September 1999
- Operation SPITFIRE air bridge evacuation 6 September 1999 – 19 September 1999
- Defence Cooperation Program 1 January 2001 – 11 May 2006
- Operation CITADEL UN missions UNMISET and UNOTIL 18 August 2003 – 11 May 2006
- Operation SPIRE 20 May 2004 – 11 May 2006
- Operation CHIRON service with UN Special Political Mission to Timor-Leste (UNOTIL/UNMIT) 20 May 2005 – 11 May 2006
For service after 11 May 2006 see Timor-Leste clasp

=== Ethiopia/Eritrea ===
30 days service with Operation POMELO, United Nations Mission in Ethiopia and Eritrea (UNMEE) from 15 January 2001 – 31 May 2005

=== Guatemala ===
30 days service with the United Nations Verification Mission in Guatemala with effect from 15 February 1997 – 14 May 1997

=== Gulf ===
30 days service with the Royal Australian Navy activity in the Persian Gulf and the Gulf of Oman between 17 November 1986 and 31 October 1988; and the continuing mine countermeasures operations within the Persian Gulf between 1 November 1988 and 28 February 1989

=== Haiti ===
30 sorties or 30 days service on authorised third country deployments with the United Nations Mission in Haiti from 1 July 1994 – 30 June 1996

=== Iran/Iraq ===
90 days service with the United Nations Iran-Iraq Military Observer Group (UNIIMOG) from 12 August 1988 – 28 February 1991

=== Iraq ===
For:
- 30 days service in southern Turkey and northern Iraq with the International Kurdish Relief Operation (Op HABITAT) from 1 May 1991 – 30 June 1991
- 7 days service within Iraq with the United Nations Special Commission in Iraq (Op BLAZER) that from 1 May 1991 – 30 June 1998
- 7 days service with the multinational military deployment in the Middle East (Op POLLARD) for the period 15 February 1998 – 30 June 1998, and for 30 days service 1 July 1998 – 1 October 2001
- 30 days service with authorised 3rd country deployments with UK and US Iraq/Persian Gulf Ops – imposing sanctions on Iraq from 16 July 1991 – 1 October 2001
- 30 days service with Operation BOLTON, the UK component imposing the No Fly Zones over Iraq, and based in Saudi Arabia, Kuwait and Incirlik airbase, Turkey, from 13 May 1999 to 12 January 2003
- 30 days service with Operation SOUTHERN WATCH, the US component imposing the No Fly Zones over Iraq, and based in Saudi Arabia, Kuwait and Incirlik airbase, Turkey, from 23 September 1999 to 12 January 2003
note: for Ops BOLTON and SOUTHERN WATCH, service over Iraq receives the AASM

=== Irian Jaya ===
30 days service on Operation CENDARAWASIH, between 1976 and 1981 (Survey Operations)

=== Kashmir ===
90 days service with the United Nations Military Observers Group India/Pakistan (UNMOGIP) from 14 February 1975 – 31 December 1985

=== Korea ===
30 days service with the United Nations Command (Military Armistice Commission) within the Korean Peninsula while involved in the preservation of the Armistice between the Democratic People's Republic of Korea and the Republic of Korea from 14 February 1975 – 30 June 2024.

Note: Replaced by the Australian Operational Service Medal - Indo-Pacific from 1 July 2024.

=== Kuwait ===
Service with the Multinational Military Force in the Persian Gulf, from 1 March 1991 – 15 July 2003 (except 17 January to 28 February 1991 – for which the Australian Active Service Medal is awarded).

=== Lebanon ===
For:
- 14 days service with Operation RAMP from 20 July 2006 to 25 August 2006 (members of the ADF who rendered service in the area comprising Lebanon only)
- 30 days service with Operation RAMP II from 13 November 2007 to 5 December 2008 (members of the ADF who rendered service in the area comprising Lebanon only)

=== Middle East ===
30 days service with:
- the United Nations Truce Supervision Organization (UNTSO) from 14 February 1975 – 31 October 2023
- the United Nations Disengagement Observer Force (UNDOF) from 14 February 1975 – 31 October 2023
- the second United Nations Emergency Force (UNEF II) from 14 February 1975 – 31 July 1979
- the United Nations Interim Force in Lebanon (UNIFIL) from 1 March 1978 – 15 September 2020
- RAN ships in North West Indian Ocean deployments from 1 September 1980 – 31 July 1986

=== Mozambique ===
30 days service in Mozambique (Op CORACLE) with effect from 12 July 1994 – 31 March 2002

=== Peshawar ===
90 days service with the United Nations Mine Clearance Training Team (UNMCTT) from 16 July 1989 – 31 December 1993

=== Sierra Leone ===
30 days service on Operation HUSKY, the International Military Advisory and Training Team (IMATT) from 15 January 2001 – 28 February 2003

=== Sinai ===
30 days service:
- with the Multinational Force and Observers in the Sinai (MFO) between 9 February 1982 and 28 April 1986
- on Operation Mazurka with the Multinational Force and Observers, with effect from 6 January 1993 – 31 October 2023. The clasp was replaced by the Australian Operational Service Medal - Africa commencing from 1 November 2023.

May also be entitled to the Multinational Force and Observers Medal

=== Solomon Islands ===
30 days service on Operation TREK, the International Peace Monitoring Team in the Solomon Islands from 4 November 2000 – 15 March 2002

=== Solomon Islands II ===
30 days service on Operation ANODE, the ADF contribution to the Regional Assistance Mission to Solomon Islands (RAMSI) from 24 July 2003 to 30 September 2013.

=== SE Asia ===
30 days service:
- on land in Malaysia from 14 February 1975 – 31 December 1989
- on land in Singapore from 14 February 1975 – 30 April 1975
- on RAN ships with ANZUK force from 14 February 1975 – 30 April 1975
- on land in Laos, Cambodia from 14 February 1975 – 13 March 1975
- with ADF activities on Operation GADING 5 on Sumatra from 6 May 1975 – 22 August 1975

Note: Those eligible for the Australian Service Medal 1945–75 with Clasp SE ASIA or Australian Service Medal 1945–75 with Clasp FESR are not eligible for the Australian Service Medal with Clasp SE ASIA.

=== S Pacific 2006 ===
30 days service with Operation Quickstep to ensure the safety of Australian Nationals in Fiji during the period 31 October 2006 and 22 December 2006.

Note: was originally issued as the FIJI 2006 clasp, named changed on 3 March 2010.

=== Special Ops ===
For service after 14 February 1975 in certain special non-warlike Australian Defence Force operations as determined by the Chief of the Defence Force. A member who received this clasp was not eligible to receive the CT/SR clasp for the same period.

=== Sudan ===
30 days service:
- with Operation AZURE, the ADF contingent with the United Nations Mission in Sudan (UNMIS) from 10 April 2005 – 31 December 2011.
- with Operation HEDGEROW, the ADF contingent with the United Nations and African Union Mission in the Darfur (UNAMID) from 28 July 2008 – 21 June 2011

=== South Sudan ===
30 days service:
- with Operation ASLAN, the ADF contingent with the United Nations Mission in South Sudan (UNMISS) from 23 September 2011 – 31 October 2023.

Note: The clasp was replaced by the Australian Operational Service Medal - Africa commencing from 1 November 2023.

=== Timor-Leste ===
For:
- 7 days/sorties (12 May – 16 June 2006) or 30 days/sorties (10 June 2006 onwards) on Operation ASTUTE from 12 May 2006 – 26 June 2008
- 30 days service as part of contributions as per 'EAST TIMOR' listed above from 12 May 2006 – 26 June 2008

May also be entitled to the Timor Leste Solidarity Medal

=== Uganda ===
90 days service with the Commonwealth Military Training Team Uganda (CMTTU) between 18 March 1982 and 24 March 1984

=== West Sahara ===
30 days service with United Nations Mission for the Referendum in Western Sahara with effect from 5 September 1991 – 15 December 2012

== Superseded clasps ==
=== Fiji 2006 ===
Name of clasp changed to S Pacific 2006 (see above)

=== Namibia ===
90 days service with the United Nations Transition Assistance Group (UNTAG) from 11 March 1989.
Originally issued with the ASM, but the period has since been deemed to be warlike service, and the Australian Active Service Medal with appropriate clasp issued instead. Recipients of the original clasp could replace it, and the ASM medal if they had no other clasps, with the AASM.

=== Rwanda ===
30 days service with the United Nations Operation in Rwanda with effect from 29 July 1994.
Originally issued with the ASM, but the period has since been deemed to be warlike service, and the Australian Active Service Medal with appropriate clasp issued instead. Recipients of the original clasp could replace it, and the ASM medal if they had no other clasps, with the AASM.

=== Vietnam 1975 ===
ADF support to the United Nations International Children's Emergency Fund (UNICEF).
Originally issued with the ASM, but the period has since been deemed to be warlike service, and the Australian Active Service Medal with appropriate clasp issued instead. Recipients of the original clasp could replace it, and the ASM medal if they had no other clasps, with the AASM.

== Revoked clasps ==
=== Somalia ===
30 days service with the First and Second United Nations Operations in Somalia (including activities associated with those operations in the areas extending 20 kilometres into Ethiopia and Kenya, 10 kilometres into Djibouti and 12 nautical miles (22 km) into the territorial waters of Somalia) between 17 October 1992 and 30 April 1993

In 2023, the Somalia clasp was revoked and cancelled.

== See also ==
- Australian Honours Order of Precedence
- Australian campaign medals
