= Korea Medal =

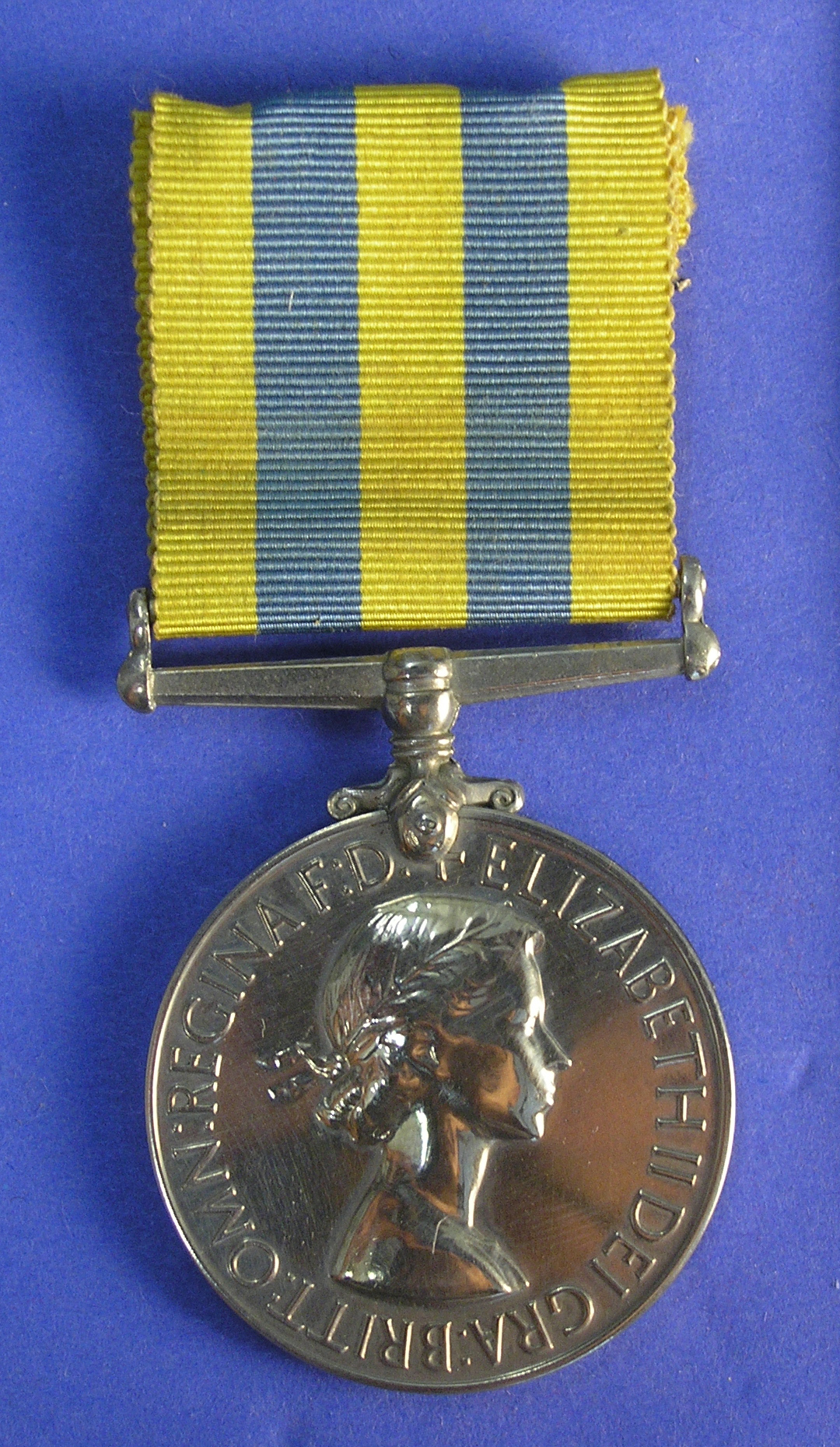
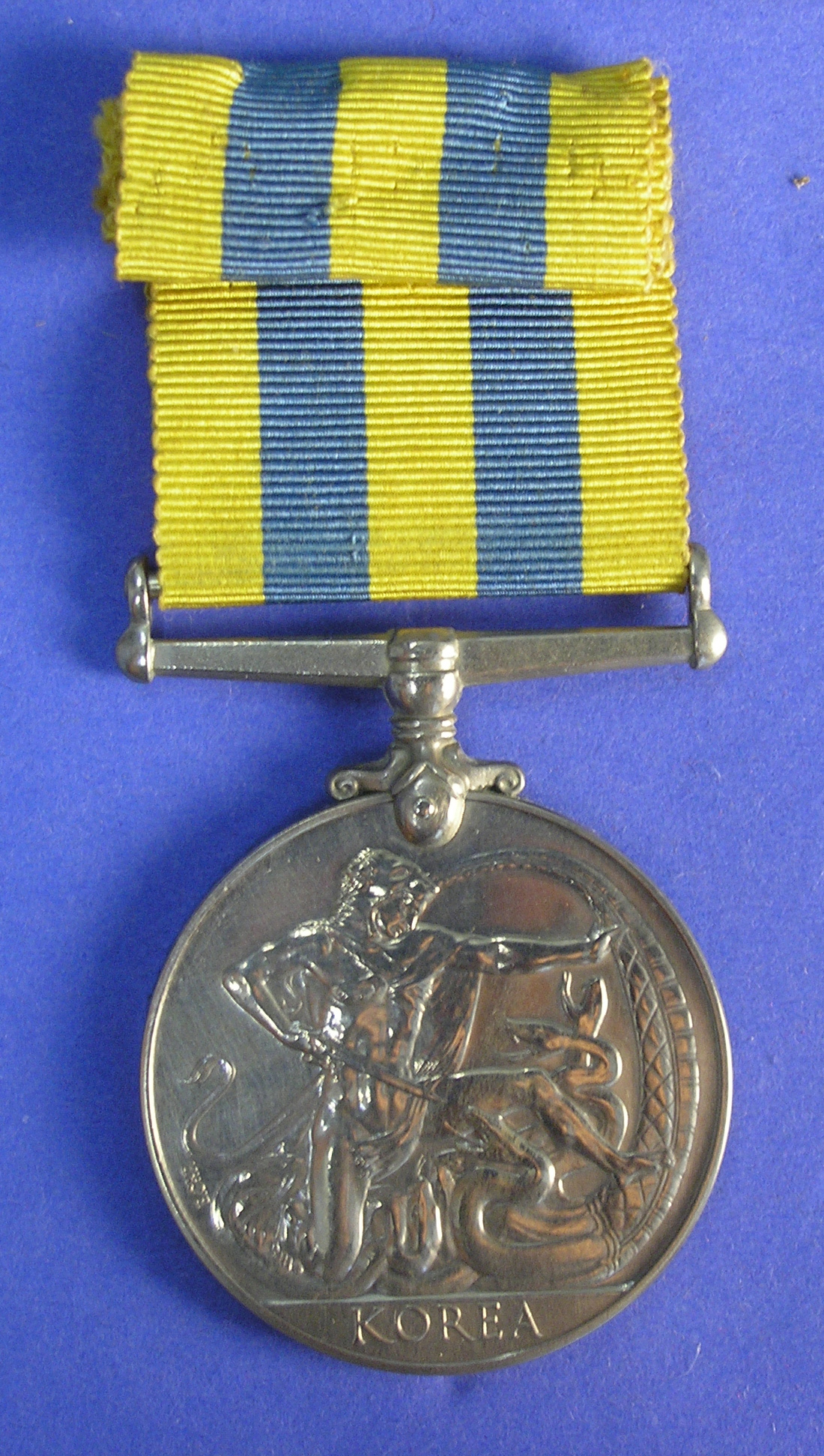
- Obverse and reverse of the medal
- Type: Campaign medal
- Awarded for: Campaign service
- Description: 36mm diameter disk Cupro-nickel, Canada issue: silver
- Presented by: The monarch of the United Kingdom
- Eligibility: Australian, British, Canadian, and New Zealand veterans of the Korean War
- Campaign: Korean War (1950–1953)
- Clasps: None
- Status: No longer awarded
- Established: July 1951
- Ribbon of the Korea Medal Ribbon with bronze oakleaf for Mentioned in Despatches

Precedence
- Next (higher): Dependent on state
- Next (lower): Dependent on state
- Related: United Nations Service Medal for Korea; Korean Service Medal; Republic of Korea War Service Medal

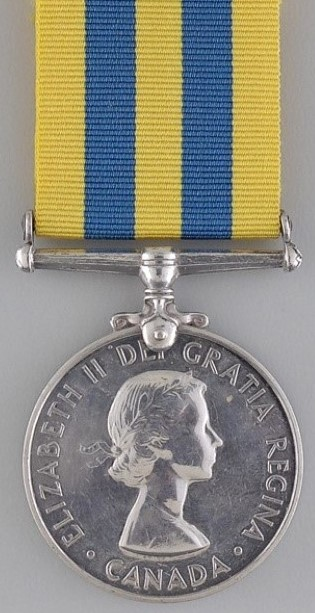
Obverse of Canadian version

The Korea Medal (French: Médaille de Corée), sometimes referred to as the Queen's Korea Medal to distinguish it from the United Nations Service Medal, is a campaign medal created in 1951 to recognise troops from Australia, Canada, New Zealand, and the United Kingdom who had given either one day's service in Korea, an air sortie over the Korean Peninsula, or 28 days service offshore, during the Korean War. The medal was identical in all countries where it was awarded, except for Canada where it contained unique elements. An award distributed across the Commonwealth, the Korea Medal holds a different place in each country's order of precedence for honours.

== History ==
The Korean War was the first event in which United Nations (UN) armed forces took on a combat role in suppressing aggression, involving the participation of 20 UN member states, as well as South Korea and Italy, in a multinational effort to stop the North Korean takeover of South Korea. The Korea Medal was created in 1951 to recognize specifically members of the armed forces from King George VI's various states at the time that participated in the Korean War; namely, Australia, Canada, New Zealand, and the United Kingdom. South Africa produced its own version of the Korea Medal.

== Design ==
Designed by Edward Carter Preston, the Korea Medal is in the form of a 36 millimetres (1.4 in) diameter disc. All medals were of cupro-nickel, except for the Canadian version that was made of silver.

On the obverse is an effigy of Queen Elizabeth II, surrounded by an inscription, symbolizing her roles as both fount of honour and Commander-in-Chief of her various forces. At the time of the medal's creation, King George VI was monarch and his effigy was to have appeared on the Korea Medal. However, he died on 6 February 1952 and so the image of his daughter was placed on the obverse of the medal, uncrowned, as per custom for sovereigns prior to their coronation.
There are three versions of the inscription surrounding the Queen's head:

- ELIZABETH II DEI GRA. BRITT. OMN. REGINA F.D. (Latin abbreviation for: Elizabeth II, by the Grace of God Queen of all the Britains, Defender of the Faith).
- ELIZABETH II DEI GRATIA REGINA F.D. (Elizabeth II, by the Grace of God Queen, Defender of the Faith), later awards omitting BRITT. OMN..
- ELIZABETH II DEI GRATIA REGINA CANADA (Elizabeth II, by the Grace of God, Queen, Canada), awarded to Canadian participants.

On the reverse is a depiction of Hercules wrestling the Hydra—a symbolic representation of communism—with the word KOREA below.

The recipient's name, rank and regimental number was impressed on the medal's rim.

This medal is worn on the left chest, suspended from a bar on a 31.8 millimetres (1.25 in) wide ribbon with five vertical stripes in alternating yellow and blue, the latter representing the United Nations. No bars were awarded. A single bronze oak leaf emblem was issued to signify a Mention in Despatches, which was worn pinned to the same ribbon from which the medal was hung.

== Eligibility and allocation ==
Members of the British and Commonwealth armed forces were granted the Korea Medal for active service in the theatre of the Korean Peninsula between 2 July 1950 and 27 July 1953. To receive the medal, navy personnel were required to complete either 28 days aboard ship in the operational areas of the Yellow Sea or the Sea of Japan, or at least one day of shore duty; air force personnel needed to complete one operational sortie over the peninsula or the surrounding seas, or meet the same requirements as naval or army personnel; and army personnel must have undertaken a minimum of one day's service on the strength of a unit serving in Korea. Any military members who had made an official visit to the region for a period of no less than 30 days were also eligible for the medal, as were those who had not fulfilled the requirements due to injury or death in combat. In some countries, civilians in the Red Cross, Order of St. John Voluntary Aid Detachment, Salvation Army, or YMCA could receive the Korea Medal, per navy requirements if they served aboard a hospital ship, or per army requirements if they were stationed on land.

Some 15,000 Korea Medals were issued to Canadian personnel, amongst which 33 members of the Royal Canadian Navy and 248 individuals in the Canadian Army were granted oak leaves to pin to their Korea Medal ribbons.

All persons awarded the Korea Medal also automatically received the United Nations Service Medal for Korea. The South Korean government offered to all UN militia the Korean War Service Medal, though regulations at the time did not permit persons from the Commonwealth to accept the decoration; in 2001, Queen Elizabeth II, as Queen of New Zealand, approved the issuance of the Korean War Services Medal to all New Zealanders who had previously received the Korea Medal.

== Precedence ==
Some orders of precedence are as follows:

Country	Preceding	Following
(Australia) Australia; Order of wear	Australian Active Service Medal 1945–1975	United Nations Korea Medal
(Canada) Canada; Order of precedence	Sacrifice Medal	Canadian Volunteer Service Medal for Korea
(New Zealand) New Zealand; Order of precedence	New Zealand Service Medal 1946–1949	Naval General Service Medal 1915–1962
(United Kingdom) United Kingdom; Order of precedence	Newfoundland Volunteer War Service Medal	General Service Medal (1962)

== See also ==
- Korea Medal (South Africa)
- Korean Service Medal
- Australian campaign medals
- British campaign medals
- New Zealand campaign medals
- Canadian order of precedence (decorations and medals)
