= Rhodesia Medal =

- Obverse and reverse of medal
- Type: Campaign Medal
- Awarded for: 14 days of service in Rhodesia between 1 December 1979 and 20 March 1980
- Presented by: United Kingdom, Australia, New Zealand, Fiji and Kenya
- Eligibility: Civilians, police, and military personnel who participated in the resolution of Zimbabwean independence
- Established: August 1980

Highlights
- Total: Circa 2,500, including 152 to Australians
- Ribbon bar of medal

Precedence
- Next (higher): Varies by country
- Next (lower): Varies by country

The Rhodesia Medal was initiated by the British Government in consultation with Australia, New Zealand, Fiji and Kenya, whose forces took part in Operation AGILA (Operation MIDFORD for the New Zealand forces). The role of the multi-national force was to keep peace between 22,000 guerrilla fighters and the Rhodesian forces during the ceasefire and run-up to the 1980 elections.

Each country treats the medal as part of its own honours system.

== Qualification ==
The medal was awarded for service of at least 14 days between 1 December 1979 and 20 March 1980, to members of the military and police forces, as well as eligible civilians, who participated in monitoring the ceasefire and supervising the elections in the lead-up to Zimbabwean independence. There was no minimum qualifying period for those killed, wounded or disabled due to service, or where a recipient was decorated for gallantry.

Recipients of the Rhodesia Medal also received the Zimbabwean Independence Medal in either silver or bronze, although British personnel did not have permission to wear it in uniform, while New Zealand granted approval for restricted wear only.

== Description ==
Issued by the Royal Mint, the Rhodesia Medal had the following design:

- It is circular, made of rhodium-plated cupro-nickel and 36 mm in diameter.
- The obverse features the crowned effigy of Queen Elizabeth II with the inscription 'ELIZABETH II DEL GRATIA REGINA FID.DEF'.
- The reverse depicts a sable antelope surrounded by the inscription 'THE RHODESIA MEDAL' and '1980'.
- The medal was issued named to British armed forces personnel, but unnamed to police officers.
- The medal is suspended from a 32 mm sky-blue ribbon with three central stripes of red, white and blue.
- No clasps were awarded.

== Precedence ==
Country	Preceding	Following
(Australia) Australia; Australian Honours Order of Precedence	Australian Service Medal	Police Overseas Service Medal
New Zealand; New Zealand Honours Order of Precedence	New Zealand General Service Medal 1992 (Warlike) w/clasp 'Vietnam'	New Zealand General Service Medal 1992 (Non Warlike) w/clasp 'Indian Ocean'
(United Kingdom) United Kingdom; Order of wear	National Crime Agency Long Service and Good Conduct Medal	Royal Ulster Constabulary Service Medal

== See also ==
- Australian campaign medals
- British campaign medals
- New Zealand campaign medals
