= Australian Service Medal 1945–1975 =

- Medal (with SE ASIA clasp) and ribbon
- Type: Campaign medal
- Awarded for: service in designated campaigns
- Presented by: Australia
- Clasps: 14
- Established: 22 February 1995
- Final award: 23 January 2014

Highlights
- Total: 104,000

Order of Wear
- Next (higher): Iraq Medal
- Next (lower): Australian General Service Medal for Korea
- Related: Australian Active Service Medal 1945–1975, Australian Service Medal

The Australian Service Medal 1945–1975 recognises service in peacekeeping or non-warlike operations in the 30-year period following World War II, and prior to 17 September 1975. The medal was established on 22 February 1995. The Australian Service Medal recognises non-warlike service after February 1975.

== Description ==
As described by the Australian Department of Defence:

- "The Australian Service Medal 1945–1975 is a nickel-silver medal ensigned with the Crown of St Edward. The obverse features the Commonwealth Coat of Arms above a spray of golden wattle" surrounded by the words 'THE AUSTRALIAN SERVICE MEDAL 1945–1975'.
- "The reverse of the medal shows the Federation Star and golden wattle" with space for recipient's details.
- "The medal ribbon has a central gold stripe flanked by two green stripes which in turn are flanked by stripes of silver grey, dark and light blue" from the Australia Service Medal 1939–45
- A nickel-silver clasp with the name of the theatre or action for which the award is made is presented with the medal.

== Clasps ==
The medal has the following clasps:

=== Berlin ===
30 days service Service with the 'Berlin Airlift', from 26 June 1948 to 30 September 1949.

This clasp was issued 36 times.

=== FESR ===
30 days service with the Far East Strategic Reserve (FESR), from 2 July 1955 to 31 October 1971.

This clasp was issued 8,761 times.

=== Germany ===
30 days service during the occupation of Germany from 9 May 1945 to 19 October 1951.

=== Indonesia ===
30 days service with:

- the UN Good Offices Commission from 1 August 1947 to 1 January 1949
- the UN Commission for Indonesia from 1 January 1949 to 30 April 1951

=== Japan ===
30 days service with British Commonwealth Occupation Force (BCOF) in Japan from 3 September 1945 to 28 April 1952

This clasp was awarded 10,058 times.

=== Kashmir ===
30 days service with UN mission in India/Pakistan, from 13 August 1948 to 13 February 1975.

=== Korea ===
30 days service in total with any of:

- the UN Commission in Korea from 9 June 1950 to 23 June 1950.
- the British Commonwealth Forces Korea (BCFK) in Japan & Okinawa from 29 April 1952 to 26 August 1957.
- service afloat and in the air off Korea to 100 miles from 28 July 1953 to 26 August 1957.
- Ceasefire monitoring activities in Korea, from 28 July 1953 to 26 August 1957.
- the UN Command (MAC) from 27 August 1957 to 13 February 1975

This clasp was issued 3,919 times.

=== PNG ===
30 days service in Papua New Guinea in nation building, training and administration of defence forces, and humanitarian relief from 3 September 1945 to 16 September 1975

This clasp was issued 14,030 times.

=== Southwest Pacific ===
30 days service associated with:

- RAAF service on Bathurst, Champagny and Sir Graham Moore Island with Long Range Navigation Stations from 3 September 1945 to 24 November 1946.
- islands in South-West Pacific area, Dutch East Indies, Burma & Malaya/Singapore, from 3 September 1945 to 24 November 1946.
- RAAF service on Morotai Island from 25 November 1946 to 10 July 1948.
- RAAF service on Cocos Island with No. 2 Airfield Construction Squadron from 18 November 1951 to 22 January 1954.
- minesweeping service afloat with the RAN in:
  - waters off coast of China & the South-West Pacific from 3 September 1945 to 30 December 1946.
  - all Australian waters from 3 September 1945 to 16 August 1948.
  - the Netherlands (Dutch East) Indies from 25 November 1946 to 30 December 1946.
  - waters off Solomon Islands from 25 November 1946 to 16 August 1948.
- undertaking bomb & mine clearance:
  - along the coast of Queensland from 3 September 1945 to 31 May 1950.
  - in the Solomon Islands 25 November 1946 to 10 November 1956.
- War Graves on Labuan, Ambon and Borneo Islands from 25 November 1946 to 20 September 1947.

This clasp was awarded 8,877 times.

=== Middle East ===
30 days service with any of:

- the UN Truce Supervision Organization from 11 June 1948 to 13 February 1975.
- No 78 (F) Wing Malta from 9 July 1952 to 1 December 1954
- the UN Observation Group in Lebanon from 11 July 1958 to 9 December 1958.
- the UN Yemen Observer Mission from 4 July 1963 to 4 September 1964.
- the Second UN Emergency Force from 25 October 1973 to 13 February 1975.
- the UN Disengagement Observer Force from 3 June 1974 to 13 February 1975.

This clasp was awarded only 14 times.

=== Southeast Asia ===
30 days service:

- on land in Malaysia (excluding Thai-Malay border when warlike), from 1 August 1960 to 16 August 1964, and from 12 August 1966 to 14 March 1975.
- on land in Singapore from 1 August 1960 to 16 August 1964, and from 12 August 1966 to 14 March 1975
- on land in Thailand (excluding Ubon & Ban Kok Talat) from 2 July 1955 to 24 June 1965, and from 1 September 1968 to 30 October 1971.
- on land in Vietnam from 2 July 1955 to 30 July 1962.
- on land in Indonesia, Laos, Cambodia from 2 July 1955 to 14 March 1975.
- on RAN ships with the ANZUK force from 31 October 1971 to 14 March 1975.

=== Special OPs ===
For service on Special Operations, for activities and dates as specified by the Chief of the Defence Force, at some time in the period 3 September 1945 and 13 February 1975.

=== Thailand ===
30 days service:

- at RTAF Base Ubon from 1 May 1962 – 24 June 1965.
- on Operation CROWN, with 2 Field Troop, RAE, at Ban Kok Talat from 1 May 1962 – 24 June 1965.

This clasp was awarded 1,401 times.

=== West New Guinea ===
30 days service with UNTEA from 3 October 1962 to 30 April 1963.

== Superseded clasps ==
A "Thai-Malay" clasp was issued for the Australian Service Medal 1945–1975 for service on land and air anti-terrorist operations along the Thai-Malay border between 1 August 1960 and 31 August 1964, or on RAAF air operations between 17 August 1964 and 30 March 1966, but in February 2002 this service was upgraded to the Australian Active Service Medal 1945–1975. A total of 1,071 clasps were issued.

== See also ==
- Australian Honours Order of Precedence
- Australian campaign medals
