= Civilian Service Medal 1939–1945 =

- Medal and ribbon
- Type: Medal
- Awarded for: service in arduous circumstances in support of the war effort as part of organisations with military-like arrangements and conditions of service.
- Presented by: Australia
- Eligibility: Civilians in Australia during World War II
- Established: 28 October 1994

Highlights
- Total: 7,147

Order of Wear
- Next (higher): National Emergency Medal
- Next (lower): National Police Service Medal

The Civilian Service Medal 1939–1945 is awarded to civilians in Australia during World War II who served in arduous circumstances in support of the war effort as part of organisations with military-like arrangements and conditions of service. The medal was introduced in 1994, following a recommendation of the Committee of Inquiry into Defence and Defence Related Awards.

The Committee intended to extend recognition only to those whose war service in Australia was more arduous than the norm, and was performed under military-like conditions. Hence, Women's Land Army members, whose work was very physical, required them to live in rural areas away from their homes for lengthy periods, and was subject to military-like discipline, are generally eligible. On the other hand, members of the industrial workforce involved in munitions production are not eligible, as they overwhelmingly lived at home and were subject to standard civilian working conditions. The medal is therefore recognition of those not in the armed services, but who experienced wartime working conditions similar to the armed services.

Recipients must have served for at least 180 days in any one or a combination of the 38 eligible groups between 3 September 1939 and 2 September 1945. Recipients of the Civilian Service Medal 1939–1945 do not earn an entitlement to use post-nominal letters. As at 30 June 2006, 6,711 awards of the Civilian Service Medal 1939–1945 had been made.

== Description ==
- The Civilian Service Medal 1939–1945 is bronze and portrays the Southern Cross surrounded by golden wattle, Australia's floral emblem. The Southern Cross represents Australia and the golden wattle represents the civilian population joining in defence of the country.
- The medal ribbon has three vertical bands. The central band is ochre to represent the soil of Australia. The two outer bands are green for the land and food production. The two white stripes on the ribbon represent communication and construction.
