= Vietnam Logistic and Support Medal =

- Obverse, reverse and ribbon of the medal
- Type: Campaign medal
- Awarded for: Campaign service.
- Description: Silver disk, 36mm diameter.
- Presented by: Australia
- Eligibility: Australian
- Campaign: Vietnam (1968–73)
- Clasps: None authorised.
- Established: 24 February 1993

Highlights
- Total: 11,500

Order of Wear
- Next (higher): Vietnam Medal
- Next (lower): Australian Active Service Medal 1945–1975

The Vietnam Logistic and Support Medal was issued to recognise the service of Australian support personnel during the Vietnam War.

== Qualification requirements ==
The qualifying criteria for the medal include:

- Service of one day or more as a member or crew of a ship or aircraft operating in the prescribed area of operations of Vietnam in support of Australian forces.
- Service of one day or more within the prescribed area of operations of Vietnam while attached to a unit or organisation in support of Australian forces.
- Service of one day or more while attached to, or serving with, a unit of the Australian armed forces or allied forces, as an observer.

Groups meeting the criteria for this award also include certain defence personnel in support roles, entertainers, journalists, civilian surgical and medical teams, Qantas aircrew and embassy couriers.

Personnel who have already earned the Vietnam Medal are ineligible for the Vietnam Logistic and Support Medal

== Description ==
- The Vietnam Logistic and Support Medal is a circular medal made of nickel-silver. The design is the same as the Vietnam Medal, but with a plain suspender.
- The obverse bears the crowned effigy of The Queen with the inscription 'ELIZABETH II DEI GRATIA REGINA F.D.'
- The reverse of the medal has the word 'VIETNAM' at the top centre above a depiction of a man standing between two symbolic spheres.
- The medal ribbon has three red stripes on a yellow centre representing South Vietnam. The ribbon also has a blue stripe to represent the Navy, a red stripe for the Army and a light blue stripe for the Air Force. The ribbon also has a brown stripe for the colour of the earth and waterways of Vietnam.
