= Australia Service Medal 1939–1945 =

Australian military campaign medal for service in the Second World War

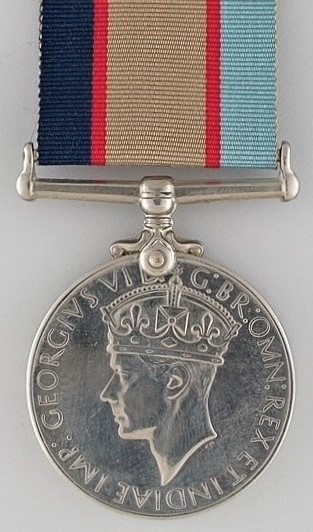
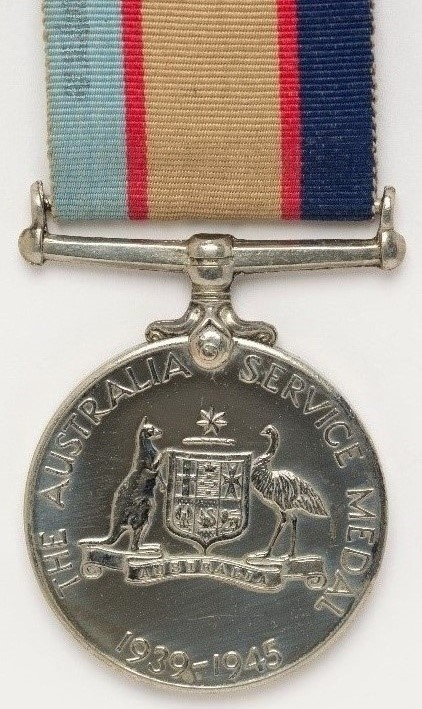
- Obverse and reverse of the medal
- Type: Campaign medal
- Awarded for: Service in World War II
- Presented by: Australia
- Clasps: None
- Established: November 1949

Highlights
- Total: Circa 600,000, including awards made post 1996
- Ribbon bar
- Related: Australian Service Medal 1945–1975, Australian Active Service Medal 1945–1975

The Australia Service Medal 1939–1945 recognises service in Australia's armed forces, Mercantile Marine and Volunteer Defence Corps during World War II.

== Award criteria ==
Gazetted in November 1949, initially, the qualifying period was at least 18 months full-time service at home or overseas, or at least three years part-time service, between 3 September 1939 and 2 September 1945. There was no minimum qualifying period for those killed, wounded or disabled due to service. On 16 August 1996, the qualifying period was reduced to 30 days for full-time service and 90 days for part-time service.

Australian Forces also qualified for the campaign stars and medals authorised for British and Commonwealth Forces, with the Australia Service Medal worn immediately after the War Medal 1939–1945.

== Description ==
- The Australia Service Medal 1939–1945 is a circular silver medal, 36 millimetres (1.4 in) in diameter.
- The obverse bears the crowned effigy of King George VI, surrounded by the inscription 'GEORGIVS VI D:G:BR:OMN:REX ET INDIAE IMP'.
- The reverse shows the coat of arms of the Commonwealth of Australia surrounded by the words 'THE AUSTRALIA SERVICE MEDAL 1939–1945'.
- The 32-millimetre (1.3 in) wide medal ribbon has a wide khaki central stripe, flanked by two narrow red stripes, with edge stripes of dark blue on the left and light blue on the right. The khaki represents the Army, and the red, dark blue and light blue represent the Mercantile Marine, Navy and Air Force respectively.

Medals were awarded with the recipient's name impressed on the rim.

== See also ==
- Australian Honours Order of Precedence
- Australian campaign medals
