= Australian Active Service Medal 1945–1975 =

- Obverse of medal (with Vietnam clasp) and ribbon
- Type: Campaign medal
- Awarded for: service in designated campaigns
- Presented by: Australia
- Clasps: Malaya; Korea; Malaysia; Thailand; Thai-Malay; Vietnam
- Established: 11 December 1997
- Final award: 23 January 2014

Highlights
- Total: 74,000

Order of Wear
- Next (higher): Vietnam Logistic and Support Medal
- Next (lower): Australian Active Service Medal
- Related: Australia Service Medal 1939–1945

The Australian Active Service Medal 1945–1975 recognises the service of Australian Defence Force and certain other persons in prescribed warlike operations in the period after World War II, and prior to February 1975. The medal was established in December 1997. The Australian Active Service Medal recognises warlike service after February 1975 until 2012 when the Australian Operational Service Medal was instituted.

== Description ==
- The Australian Active Service Medal 1945–1975 is a nickel-silver medal ensigned with the Crown of St Edward. The obverse has a Federation Star with the inscription "The Australian Active Service Medal 1945–1975" in capital letters.
- The reverse has a wreath of golden wattle flanking a central horizontal panel.
- The medal ribbon is 32mm wide and has a central red stripe flanked by yellow stripes which in turn are flanked by stripes of blue, green and purple. These colours are representative of the ribbon colours of the Imperial awards previously issued for campaign service.

== Related medals ==
Recipients of this medal are also entitled to the issue of the Returned from Active Service Badge.

Recipients of the AASM 1945–75 may be authorised to wear up to three further medals for the same period of service; a UK campaign medal, a medal from an international organisation and a medal from a host nation.

During this period campaign and service medals under the UK system were originally issued. The Australian system of honours was introduced in 1975 following which Australian service and campaign medals were issued to Australian Military Force personnel, and the issue of UK medals discontinued.

The AASM 1945–75 was issued retrospectively to provide an Australian recognition of the service. The AASM 1945–75 was issued in addition to the existing UK medals. The UK medals remained recognised in the Australian Order of Precedence. UK medals applicable to a clasp are referenced with the clasp details.

Personnel who receive this medal may also be entitled to receive a service or campaign medal from an international organisation or the host country, if they meet the eligibility criteria for those medals. These are treated as foreign medals in the Australian system, and if approved for wear on service uniforms, are worn after Australian medals in the order they are received.

Some of the international and host nation medals have been granted a blanket authority for all recipients to wear. Others are approved on an individual basis. Any foreign medals with blanket approval to be worn are referenced with the clasp. In addition all UN medals are authorised for wear.

== Clasps ==
The medal has the following clasps:

=== MALAYA ===
1 days service during the Malayan Emergency from 16 June 1948 – 31 July 1960

See also General Service Medal (1918) with clasp Malaya
May also be eligible for the Malaysian Pingat Jasa Malaysia

=== KOREA ===
1 days service during the Korean War from 1 July 1950 – 27 July 1953

see also Korea Medal
see also the United Nations Korea Medal

=== MALAYSIA ===
1 days service in:

- Brunei, North Borneo and Sarawak from 8 December 1962 – 23 December 1962
- Sabah, Sarawak and Brunei from 24 December 1962 – 11 August 1966
- Malay Peninsula and Singapore from 17 August 1964 – 11 August 1966

See also General Service Medal (1962) with clasps Malay Peninsula and Borneo
May also be eligible for the Malaysian Pingat Jasa Malaysia

=== THAILAND ===
1 days service:

- at RTAF Base Ubon from 25 June 1965 – 31 August 1968
- with 2 Field Troop, RAE at Ban Kok Talat in Operation CROWN from 25 June 1965 – 31 August 1968

=== THAI-MALAY ===
1 days service in:

- Land and air anti-terrorist operations (1 August 1960 – 31 December 1964)
- RAAF air operations (17 August 1964 – 30 March 1966)

Initially, this service was recognised with a similarly named clasp to the Australian Service Medal 1945–1975, but it was upgraded to the AASM 1945–1975 in February 2002.

=== VIETNAM ===
For recipients of:

- GSM (1962) with clasp South Vietnam – 24 December 1962 – 28 May 1964
- Vietnam Medal – 29 May 1964 – 27 January 1973
- Vietnam Logistic and Support Medal – 29 May 1964 – 27 January 1973

== See also ==
- Australian Honours Order of Precedence
- Australian campaign medals
