= Ian Langford =

Ian Langford may refer to:

- Ian Langford (cricketer)
- Ian Langford (soldier)
