= 2008 Queen's Birthday Honours (Australia) =

Australian honours commemorating Queen Elizabeth II's birthday in 2008

The Queen's Birthday Honours 2008 were appointments in the Australian honours system to recognise and reward good works by citizens of Australia and other nations that contribute to Australia. The Birthday Honours are awarded as part of the Queen's Official Birthday celebrations and were announced on 8 June 2008 in Australia.

The recipients of honours are displayed as they were styled before their new honour and arranged by honour with grades and then divisions i.e. Civil, Diplomatic and Military as appropriate.

== Order of Australia ==
=== Companion (AC) ===
==== General Division ====
- The Honourable Emeritus Professor Peter Erne Baume, AO, of New South Wales. For service to advancing higher education as an academic, researcher and administrator, and to the community through leadership roles in organisations addressing significant public health and social policy issues.
- Dr David Michael Bennett, AO QC, of New South Wales. For service to the law, particularly as Commonwealth Solicitor-General, through the provision of advice on matters of national interest and the international promotion of Australian legal services and education.
- The Honourable Dr Geoffrey Ian Gallop, of New South Wales. For distinguished service to the Parliament of Western Australia, to the promotion of economic development and environmental sustainability, and to the community through educational, health and social reform.
- Mr Reg Grundy, OBE, of New South Wales. For service to the entertainment and television industry as the creator and producer of television programs depicting national cultural identity, to the promotion of Australia internationally, and to the community through philanthropic contributions to a range of organisations.
- The Honourable John Winston Howard, of New South Wales. For distinguished service to the Parliament of Australia, particularly as Prime Minister and through contributions to economic and social policy reform, fostering and promoting Australia's interests internationally, and the development of significant philanthropic links between the business sector, arts and charitable organisations.
- Mr William John Kelty, of Victoria. For service to the trade union movement, particularly through the establishment of the universal system of superannuation, through improvements to productivity and conditions in the workplace and the development of youth training schemes.
- His Excellency the Honourable Justice Kevin Horace Parker, AO RFD, The Hague, Netherlands. For eminent service to the law and the judiciary, particularly as Vice-President of the International Criminal Tribunal for the former Yugoslavia, and to the Anglican Church in Western Australia.
- Mr Kerry Matthew Stokes, AO, of Western Australia. For service to business and commerce through strategic leadership and promotion of corporate social responsibility, to the arts through executive roles and philanthropy, and to the community, particularly through contributions to organisations supporting youth.

=== Officer (AO) ===
==== General Division ====
- Mr Richard Hugh Allert, AM, of South Australia. For service to the business sector through visionary leadership and promotion of corporate social responsibility, and to the community through involvement with and support for a range of artistic, charitable and educational organisations.
- The Most Reverend Archbishop John Alexius Bathersby, of Queensland. For service to the Catholic Church in Australia, particularly as Archbishop of Brisbane, and to the community through the promotion of ecumenical dialogue.
- Professor James Frank Bishop, of New South Wales. For service to medicine, particularly in the field of cancer treatment and research and through the development of innovative policy, improved public awareness and service delivery programs.
- Professor Christopher John Burrell, of South Australia. For service to medicine as a specialist in infectious diseases, particularly in the field of virology, as an administrator and educator, and to the community of South Australia through the establishment of the Coriole Music Festival.
- Mr Roger Campbell Corbett, AM, of New South Wales. For service to business, particularly through leadership and executive roles in the retail sector and a range of allied organisations, and to the community.
- Ms Patricia Mary Faulkner, of Victoria. For service to the community through the development and implementation of public policy relating to health, aged care, children's services, disability services and housing.
- Dr Geoffrey Graham Garrett, of Australian Capital Territory. For service to scientific research and administration through leadership of the Commonwealth Scientific and Industrial Research Organisation and the development and implementation of innovative research initiatives.
- Dr Colin (Col) Gellatly, of New South Wales. For service to the community as a leader in policy reform and administration in the New South Wales public sector, particularly through the coordination of whole-of-government program initiatives.
- Professor Michael Francis Good, of Queensland. For service to medical research, particularly in the fields of infectious disease immunology and vaccine technology, through leadership roles at the Queensland Institute of Medical Research and contributions to education.
- Ms Joanna Miriam Hewitt, Washington DC, USA. For service to the community, particularly through significant contributions to Australia's agricultural, forestry and fishing sectors, to cross departmental policy formulation and delivery, and to international relations through fostering diplomatic, trade and cultural interests.
- The Honourable Chief Justice Terence John Higgins, of Australian Capital Territory. For service to the judiciary and to the law, particularly as Chief Justice for the Australian Capital Territory, and to the community through leadership roles with a range of sporting, educational and social welfare organisations.
- Mrs Dorothy Jane Hoddinott, of New South Wales. For service to education and the teaching profession, particularly through the Australian Joint Council of Professional Teaching Associations and through the professional development of teachers of English as a second language, and to the community through the support of immigrant and refugee students.
- Commissioner Malcolm Arthur Hyde, APM, of South Australia. For service to policing and law enforcement as Commissioner of Police in South Australia, particularly through the development of improved service delivery methods, to the detection and prevention of illicit drug use and electronic crime, and through contributions to national law enforcement policies.
- Mr Ubaldo Larobina, OBE, of Victoria. For service to the media, particularly through the distribution of news and information to Italians living in Australia, and to the community through a range of multicultural, educational and charitable organisations.
- Ms Kim Coral McKay, of New South Wales. For service to the environment through executive public relations roles with a range of organisations, particularly as co-founder of Clean Up Australia and Clean Up the World, and to the community.
- Mr Martyn Kenneth Myer, of Victoria. For service to business and to the community, particularly through contributions to medical research and the establishment of the Florey Neurosciences Institute and through executive and philanthropic roles with a range of organisations.
- His Honour Thomas Ian Pauling, QC, of Northern Territory. For service to the Northern Territory through significant contributions to the law, particularly relating to constitutional matters, to the development of legal organisations and the promotion of professional standards, and to the community.
- Professor John Ralston, of South Australia. For service to science and to scientific research, particularly in the field of physical chemistry and minerals processing, to education and to the creation and application of new scientific knowledge to industry.
- Mr Arthur Sinodinos, of New South Wales. For service to politics through the executive function of government, to the development of economic policy and reform, and to the Greek community.
- Professor Ian Hugh Sloan, of New South Wales. For service to education through the study of mathematics, particularly in the field of computational mathematics, as an academic, researcher and mentor, and to a range of national and international professional associations.
- Dr Ian James Watt, of Australian Capital Territory. For service to the community through the development of public policy and administration in the areas of finance and governance, budget and expenditure policy, taxation reform, and through contributions to international professional finance organisations.
- Mr Jeffrey Robert Whalan, of Australian Capital Territory. For service to the community through the implementation and administration of government policies and initiatives in the area of social services and welfare programs, and to the development of corporate accountability and stakeholder management processes.

=== Member (AM) ===
==== General Division ====
- Mr Donald John Alexander, of South Australia. For service to engineering, particularly the water supply sector in South Australia.
- Professor Dennis Patkin Altman, of Victoria. For service to education as an academic, social and political commentator, and to the community through raising awareness of human rights issues and as a contributor to the development of HIV/AIDS policy.
- Mr Peter James Andren, deceased, of New South Wales. For service to the Parliament of Australia, and to the rural and regional communities of central west New South Wales, particularly through support for a range of Indigenous, disability and health service organisations.
- Dr Anona Fern Armstrong, of Victoria. For service to education through research and teaching roles in the fields of management, corporate governance, and evaluation, to professional organisations, and to the community.
- Associate Professor Robert Neville Atkinson, RFD, of South Australia. For service to medicine as an orthopaedic surgeon and through contributions to professional associations.
- Mr Edmund John Bailey, of Northern Territory. For service to the horseracing industry in the Northern Territory through the development and administration of the sport, and to the community.
- Mr Gerald Anthony Barry, of Queensland. For service to the community through a range of executive and support roles with ostomy associations.
- Dr Alfred John Bass, of Tasmania. For service to the community through the development of information technology systems relating to the collection of population health data.
- Mr Brian Joseph Bertwistle, of Queensland. For service to the transport and logistics industry, particularly through support for educational programs and driver and vehicle safety initiatives.
- Mr Michael Peter Berwick, of Queensland. For service to conservation and the environment through initiatives supporting the preservation of the Daintree Rainforest and far north Queensland, to local government, and to the community of Douglas Shire.
- Mr Kenneth Robert Bickle, of New South Wales. For service to the pharmacy profession through executive roles with a range of organisations, and to the community as a supporter of the Return Unwanted Medicines Program.
- Mr Ian Ross Bidmeade, of South Australia. For service to public health and to people with disabilities through contributions to administrative and legislative reforms, and to the community through a range of social welfare organisations.
- Professor Louis Charles Birch, of New South Wales. For service to science, particularly in the field of biology as an academic and researcher, and through contributions to the understanding of the relationship of science to religion.
- Mr Kevin Michael Blake, of Victoria. For service to international humanitarian aid through fundraising and administrative roles with Melbourne Overseas Missions.
- Mrs Shirley Lillian Blake, of Victoria. For service to international humanitarian aid through fundraising and administrative roles with Melbourne Overseas Missions.
- Mrs Ellen May Boyd, of Victoria. For service to youth, particularly through the Guiding movement as State Commissioner, Victoria, and to the community as a contributor to a range of women's organisations.
- Ms Dorothy Buckland-Fuller, MBE, of New South Wales. For service to the community as a contributor to a range of social justice, ethnic and migrant women's organisations and through raising awareness of issues affecting women from culturally and linguistically diverse backgrounds.
- Professor Catherin Jane Bull, of Victoria. For service to landscape architecture and urban design as an academic, researcher and practitioner and through contributions to a range of professional organisations and advisory bodies.
- Mr Bruno Giovanni Camarri, of Western Australia. For service to business, particularly in the resources sector, to the law, and to the community of Western Australia through a range of charitable organisations.
- Mrs Doreen Fay Campbell, of New South Wales. For service to industrial relations, and to the community of the Illawarra.
- Mr Peter David Campbell, of New South Wales. For service to the community through philanthropic contributions to a range of health, social welfare, youth and charitable organisations.
- Mrs Mollie Campbell-Smith, MBE, of Tasmania. For service to the community of Tasmania, particularly through the promotion of issues that affect the interests of women and to a range of organisations involved in the areas of health and aged care.
- Professor Robert John Clark, of Tasmania. For service to agricultural science as an academic, educator and administrator, particularly through contributions to the University of Tasmania and the Tasmanian Institute of Agricultural Research.
- Mr Denis Chadwick Cleary, of New South Wales. For service to business, particularly the finance sector, and to the community through a range of voluntary roles with sporting groups.
- The Reverend Canon Dr Raymond Leslie Cleary, of Victoria. For service to the Anglican Church of Australia, and to the community through executive roles in a range of social justice and welfare organisations.
- Mr Paul Hugh Clitheroe, of New South Wales. For service to the finance sector through the promotion of financial literacy, and to the community.
- Mr Michael Stanley Cockram, of Western Australia. For service to the community through executive roles with Prison Fellowship Western Australia and as a supporter of restorative justice programs.
- Sister Mary Denise Coghlan, of Queensland. For service to international humanitarian aid as Director of the Jesuit Refugee Services, Cambodia.
- Dr Timothy James Cooper, of South Australia. For service to the brewing industry, particularly through the implementation of environmentally sustainable production and manufacturing practices, to professional organisations, and to the community.
- Mr Gregory Gane Cornwell, of Australian Capital Territory. For service to the Australian Capital Territory Legislative Assembly, and to a range of community organisations.
- Adjunct Professor Peter Russell Corrigan, of Victoria. For service to architecture as an academic, educator and practitioner and to the arts, particularly through theatre production design.
- Ms Sue Margaret Cumming, of Queensland. For service to the community, particularly in the field of social work as a clinician and through administrative roles with a range of professional associations.
- Mr Albert Dadon, of Victoria. For service to the arts, particularly through the Melbourne Jazz Festival, to the community through philanthropic support for cultural and charitable organisations, and to business.
- Professor Elizabeth Anne Davies, of New South Wales. For service to nursing, particularly in the areas of nurse and midwifery education, and to the community through a range of health-related organisations and advisory bodies.
- Mrs Janice Maxine (Jan) Davis, of South Australia. For service to the Legislative Council of the Parliament of South Australia through administrative and support roles.
- Mr John Kelvin Dawson, of Queensland. For service to business, particularly the banking and finance sector and to the development of relations between Australia and Britain.
- Ms Rayne De Gruchy, PSM, of Australian Capital Territory. For continued service to public administration, particularly through specialist legal services and to corporate governance.
- Ms Tania Karen de Jong, of Victoria. For service to the arts as a performer and entrepreneur and through the establishment and development of music and arts enrichment programs for schools and communities.
- Dr Andrew Wesley Dent, of Victoria. For service to emergency medicine as an academic, researcher and educator and through administrative roles at St Vincent's Hospital, Melbourne.
- Emeritus Professor David Michael Doddrell, of Queensland. For service to science in the field of magnetic resonance as an academic and researcher.
- Mr Esmond Joseph Downey, of Victoria. For service to the community through a range of church, educational and aged care organisations.
- Professor Geoffrey Gordon Duggin, of New South Wales. For service to renal medicine and toxicology as a clinician and researcher, and through contributions to professional associations.
- Professor Elizabeth Jane Elliott, of New South Wales. For service to paediatrics and child health as an academic, researcher and educator and through the establishment of the Australian Paediatric Surveillance Unit.
- Mr Tony Fini, of Western Australia. For service to the building and construction industry in Western Australia, and to the community through support for sporting and cultural organisations.
- Councillor Kevin Malcolm Forbes, of Western Australia. For service to local government in the Mount Barker region, and to the community through business, educational and emergency service organisations.
- Emeritus Professor Richard George Fox, of Victoria. For service to the law and to legal education, particularly in the areas of criminal procedure and sentencing.
- Mr Arthur George Frame, of Queensland. For service to the performing arts and to the community through administrative and advisory roles with a range of organisations in Queensland and support for artists in rural and regional areas.
- Mr David Maxwell Freeman, of New South Wales. For service to the Jewish community, particularly through the development of hospital and aged care facilities in Sydney.
- Mr Paul Albert Gardner, of Victoria. For service to the community through social welfare organisations addressing youth homelessness and unemployment, to the arts, and to advertising.
- Ms Carol Frances Gaston, of South Australia. For service to the community, particularly through the health services planning and management sector in South Australia, to nursing education, and to humanitarian work in Australia and overseas.
- Mr James Philip Graham, of New South Wales. For service to business, particularly in the financial services sector, and to the community through support for medical research and educational organisations.
- Mr David John Gray, of Western Australia. For service to commerce and industry through leadership roles in peak organisations representing the business sector, and to the performing arts in Western Australia.
- Dr Robert Stirling Greenhill, RFD, of Queensland. For service to public sector dentistry, particularly through the development of specialist orthodontic services and interdisciplinary management of patients with cleft lip and palate and craniofacial anomalies, to dental education, and to professional organisations.
- Mr Malcolm John Grierson, of Queensland. For service to the community, particularly through contributions to the development of major infrastructure and public works facilities in Queensland.
- Mr Peter John Griffin, of Victoria. For service to the community through support for health, medical research, arts and charitable organisations, and to business, particularly in the investment and banking sectors.
- Professor Miraca Una Gross, of New South Wales. For service to education as an academic, researcher and author through the design and delivery of programs and policies for gifted students and their teachers, to professional development and educational practice.
- Mrs Jennifer Therese Hagger, of South Australia. For service to the community, particularly through executive roles with the House of Prayer for All Nations - Adelaide and Mission World Aid.
- Dr Janet Mary Hammill, of Queensland. For service to the community through health services for Indigenous women and children and research into the effects of foetal alcohol syndrome.
- Mr Vivian William Hanley, of New South Wales. For service to the transport, storage and furniture removal industries through a range of representational roles, training initiatives, and contributions to improving industry standards.
- Associate Professor Jack Hansky, of Victoria. For service to medicine in the field of gastroenterology, particularly through research and clinical practice in the treatment of gastric bleeding, to medical education, and to the community.
- Mr Ian Kenneth Hardy, of South Australia. For service to the community, particularly in the area of aged care as a leading contributor to the development of better services, and through support for opera.
- The Honourable Justice David Lindsey Harper, of Victoria. For service to law reform, to the judiciary, and in the area of international humanitarian law, and to the community through support services for the care and resettlement of offenders and their families.
- Mr Antony Paul Hasham, of New South Wales. For service to the community through Variety, the Children's Charity and Life Education Australia, and to the hairdressing industry.
- Ms Carmel Hattch, of Northern Territory. For service to paediatric and outreach nursing, to the welfare of Indigenous children in the Northern Territory, and as a foster parent.
- Mr Michael Sidney Hill Smith, of South Australia. For service to the development of the Australian wine industry, particularly as a judge, educator and mentor, to professional organisations, and as a winemaker.
- Mr Edward William Howard, OBE OAM, of Queensland. For service to the community through executive, advisory and leadership roles with a range of health, tenancy, church and social welfare organisations.
- Mr John Weir Ingram, of New South Wales. For service to industry, particularly in the area of industrial relations reform, to the manufacturing sector through executive roles, and to the community.
- Mr Antony Simon Jeffrey, of New South Wales. For service to arts administration through executive roles with a range of cultural organisations, and to the design, development and promotion of sponsorship and fundraising programs for the performing arts.
- Dr Kenneth Alan Johnson, of Northern Territory. For service to the development of conservation management strategies for Australia's desert flora and fauna through research and in partnership with the traditional Aboriginal owners of the land.
- Dr Roderic Edward Kefford, of New South Wales. For service to primary and secondary education through administrative and teaching roles, particularly in independent schools, and contributions to educational organisations.
- Mr Donald William Kinsey, of Victoria. For service to the community through public speaking programs and a range of executive roles with charitable, child health care and educational support organisations.
- Mr John Kendall (Jack) Knight, of New South Wales. For service to engineering through leadership and innovation in major infrastructure development projects in Australia and internationally, to professional education, and to the community.
- Mr Justin Lee Langer, of Western Australia. For service to cricket as a player and mentor and to the community, particularly through fundraising and support for a wide range of charities, including children's leukaemia and cancer research organisations.
- Mr John Mick Lee, OAM, of Western Australia. For service to local government, particularly within the Town of Victoria Park, and to the community through leadership and support roles with a range of organisations.
- Ms Frances Hewlett Lovejoy, deceased, of New South Wales. For service to education, particularly in the fields of sociology and women's studies as an educator, author and mentor.
- Emeritus Professor Judy Lumby, of New South Wales. For service to nursing education, to professional organisations, and to the community through contributions to improving safety and quality in health care services.
- Professor Peter Francis McDonald, of Australian Capital Territory. For service in the fields of demography and social research, particularly relating to population dynamics and future studies, through the exploration of related policy options and through education.
- Mr Andrew John McGalliard, RFD ED, of Victoria. For service to the Defence community, particularly through leadership roles with support, advisory and charitable organisations, and to engineering.
- Mr John Francis McGrath, of Victoria. For service to the community through a range of mental health organisations, to the Parliament of Victoria and to the National Party of Australia.
- Professor John Ralph McKellar, ED, of South Australia. For service to people with dementia, particularly Alzheimer's disease, and their carers through organisations that provide education, support services and funding for research.
- Ms Cathryn Rosemary McKenzie, of Victoria. For service to the law and to the community as an advocate for human rights and equal opportunity.
- Professor Sandra Vianne (Vi) McLean, of Queensland. For service to higher education as an administrator, academic and leader, and to the development of national standards for the teaching profession.
- Mr Leo Francis Mahony, deceased, of Australian Capital Territory. For service to the community through executive roles with the Royal United Services Institute of Australia.
- Mr John Messara, of New South Wales. For service to the thoroughbred horseracing industry, particularly through the introduction of best practice initiatives in the areas of reproduction and stud management.
- Ms Voula Messimeri-Kianidis, of Victoria. For service to the community through executive roles with a range of multicultural organisations, and advocacy roles on behalf of migrants, refugees and women.
- Sister Theresa Anne Morellini, of Western Australia. For service to the Indigenous community of the Kimberley region, particularly in the areas of social welfare and education, the prevention of alcohol and substance abuse, and pastoral care programs.
- Dr Jacqueline April Morgan, of New South Wales. For service to medicine, particularly in the field of neuromuscular disorders, and to the community through a range of organisations involved in research and support for people with muscular dystrophy.
- Dr Kenneth John Moss, of New South Wales. For service to business in the mining, financial and property development sectors, and to the community through contributions to maritime, educational and health organisations.
- Mr Ian Crawford Murray, of New South Wales. For service to business, particularly international trade, through executive roles with a range of export-related organisations, and to professional education.
- Professor Hyland Neil (Hank) Nelson, of Australian Capital Territory. For service to tertiary education as an academic, researcher and political commentator on the contemporary history of Papua New Guinea.
- Mr Norman John O'Bryan, of Victoria. For service to the community through executive and fundraising roles for medical research organisations, particularly in the area of cardiovascular health.
- Professor Patrick Joseph O'Keefe, of Queensland. For service to the protection and repatriation of cultural property and heritage, to the law as a lecturer and author, and to legal education.
- Mr Justin Francis O'Sullivan, of Queensland. For service to the law through a range of roles with professional legal organisations, particularly the Queensland Law Society, as a practitioner, and to the community.
- Professor Anthony Wilfred (Tony) Parker, of Queensland. For service to sports medicine and exercise science as an academic, researcher and author and through executive and advisory roles with professional organisations.
- Associate Professor David Cleland Paton, of South Australia. For service to conservation and the environment through research into the ecology and behaviour of Australian birds, to the management and restoration of the natural environment, and to education.
- Ms Penelope Ann Paton, of South Australia. For service to conservation and the environment through the management of natural resources and ecosystems, and as a contributor to environmental and ornithological research projects.
- Mr Michael Delaney Perrott, of Western Australia. For service to the community through support for a range of mental health and suicide prevention organisations, and to governance and strategic planning in the tertiary education sector.
- Emeritus Professor Peter Duhig Phelan, of Victoria. For service to medicine, particularly in the area of paediatrics as an academic and administrator and through contributions to the development of health care delivery and clinical practice management.
- Dr Glen David Postle, of Queensland. For service to education through the design and introduction of flexible learning programs for disadvantaged youth in rural and remote areas, and to professional development.
- Professor Stephen John Redman, of Australian Capital Territory. For service to medical science, particularly in the field of experimental neuroscience as an academic and researcher and through contributions to professional organisations.
- Mrs Margaret Lynette Rose, of New South Wales. For service to the building and construction industry and to the community, particularly in the area of sustainable urban development and planning and through support for a range of charitable organisations.
- Mr Robert Michael Rose, of New South Wales. For service to the building and construction industry and to the community, particularly in the area of sustainable urban development and planning and through support for a range of charitable organisations.
- Mr Stanley Barry Roth, of New South Wales. For service to the community through executive roles with the United Israel Appeal of Australia, as a supporter of a range of charitable organisations, and to business.
- Dr John Frank Roulston, of Queensland. For service to education, particularly through administrative and teaching roles in the independent schools sector, to the development of schools-based drug prevention programs and contributions to professional organisations.
- Mrs Pamela Ryan, MBE, of Victoria. For service to athletics as a competitor, coach and mentor, and through administrative roles with Athletics International.
- Mr Leslie John (Les) Schirato, of New South Wales. For service to the community through philanthropic contributions to health, youth, church and social welfare organisations, and to business.
- Mr Reginald Francis Scott, OAM, of New South Wales. For service to dental health through executive roles with professional organisations, and to the development of training programs for dental prosthetists.
- Mrs Penelope Alice Seidler, of New South Wales. For service to the preservation of cultural heritage, particularly through The Australiana Fund, to visual arts organisations, and to architecture.
- Mr Alwyn Jeffrey Shaw, of Tasmania. For service to the building and construction industries through a range of civil and infrastructure projects, and to the thoroughbred horse breeding industry.
- Dr Marie Gabrielle Siganto, of Queensland. For service to the arts and education through contributions to artistic, cultural, educational and multicultural organisations, and as a benefactor and supporter of professional development programs.
- Mr Warwick Louis Smith, of Victoria. For service to people with vision impairments, particularly through executive roles with Guide Dogs Victoria, and to the accountancy profession.
- Professor Edgar William (Ted) Snell, of Western Australia. For service to the visual arts as an academic, artist, commentator and administrator, to professional organisations, and as a mentor of young artists.
- Mr Anthony Eric (Tony) South, OAM, of Queensland. For service to the community as a campaigner for people with a disability and through contributions to the development of spinal injury prevention and research programs.
- Professor Thomas Harley Spurling, of Victoria. For service to chemical science through contributions to national innovation policies, strategies and research, and to the development of professional scientific relationships within the Asian region.
- Mr Anthony Charles Stacey, of Tasmania. For service to the footwear manufacturing industry, and to the community through executive roles with a range of arts, motoring and service groups.
- Ms Janette Mary (Jan) Stirling, of South Australia. For service to women's basketball as an elite coach and player and as a contributor to professional development, and to the community.
- Professor Russell William Stitz, RFD, of Queensland. For service to medicine in the field of colorectal surgery, to the development of surgical education and training programs, and through leadership roles in professional organisations.
- The Right Reverend Ronald Francis Stone, of Victoria. For service to the Anglican Church of Australia, and to rural and remote communities through executive roles with social welfare organisations.
- Dr Helen Lesley Sykes, of Victoria. For service to youth, particularly through the Trust for Young Australians, to leadership development programs, and to child and adolescent mental health.
- Ms Dianne Marion Thorley, of Tasmania. For service to local government and to the community of the Toowoomba region through a range of youth education, social welfare, environment and conservation projects and associations.
- Mr Barry Thornton, of Queensland. For service to the manufacturing and transport industries, to the development of infrastructure reform projects, and to the community through support for educational, arts and charitable organisations.
- Mr Richard Kinsley (Darcy) Tronson, of Tasmania. For service to politics through roles supporting the executive function of government, and to the Australian Maritime College.
- Associate Professor Ronald Stewart Walls, of New South Wales. For service to medicine in the fields of clinical immunology and allergy, as an academic, researcher and administrator, to the advancement of medical education, and to professional associations.
- Mr Russell Alexander Watts, of New South Wales. For service to conservation and the environment through advocacy roles for the preservation of endangered flora and fauna, particularly native bird species, and to the development of ecotourism initiatives.
- Mr John Randall Weigel, of New South Wales. For service to the conservation of reptile and amphibian species, to wildlife management, research and education, and to regional tourism in New South Wales.
- Brother Anthony Peter Whelan, of New South Wales. For service to education through a range of executive and teaching roles in the Catholic education sector, to the promotion of social justice, and to professional standards development.
- Mr Bruce Gilmore Wilson, of Queensland. For service to transport planning, infrastructure development and reform, and to land management policy, particularly in Queensland, and through contributions to advisory bodies.
- Mrs Karen Louise Wilson, of New South Wales. For service to botany as a researcher and through the recording and documentation of Australian biodiversity.
- Mr Phillip Paul Wolanski, of New South Wales. For service to the community through executive roles and philanthropic contributions to a range of arts, sporting and cultural organisations, particularly the National Institute of Dramatic Art.
- Mr Andrew Stuart Wright, of Victoria. For service to the heavy vehicle design and manufacturing industry, to the development of automotive export markets, and through fostering innovative trade skills training programs.

==== Military Division ====
Navy

- Captain Jaimie Charles Hatcher, of Australian Capital Territory. For exceptional service as Commanding Officer HMAS Toowoomba during deployment on Operation Catalyst.
- Commodore Bruce James Kafer, CSC, of New South Wales. For exceptional service to the Royal Australian Navy, particularly as the Chief, Combat Support Group in Fleet Headquarters.
- Commodore Clinton William Thomas, CSC, of Victoria. For exceptional service as Commanding Officer HMAS Cerberus/Training Authority-Logistics, Director General Strategic Logistics, Director General Sea Change Implementation Team, and Chairman of the Royal Australian Navy Relief Trust Fund.

Army

- Lieutenant Colonel Peter James Connor, of New South Wales. For exceptional service as Commanding Officer, 2nd/17th Battalion, Royal New South Wales Regiment and Rotation 12 of Combined Task Force 635, Operation Anode.
- Colonel Fergus Andrew McLachlan, of Australian Capital Territory. For exceptional service to the Australian Defence Force as the Commanding Officer of the 1st Armoured Regiment; Operations Officer on Headquarters Joint Task Force 633 during Operation Catalyst; Acting Director of Operations — Army; Director of Officer Career Management Army, and as the Commander Career Management Army.
- Lieutenant Colonel Paul Michael Nothard, CSC, of New South Wales. For exceptional service as Staff Officer Grade One for Senior Officer Management in the Australian Army, Commanding Officer of the 1st Combat Service Support Battalion, and as the Commander of the Force Level Logistic Asset in the Middle East Area of Operations.
- Brigadier Malcolm Rerden, CSC, of Victoria. For exceptional service as the Commander Joint Task Force 631 on Operation Astute.
- Brigadier Craig Douglas Williams, of New South Wales. For exceptional service to the Australian Army as Assistant Commander 2nd Division and as Commander 5th Brigade.

Air Force

- Air Commodore John Stephen Hewitson, of Australian Capital Territory. For exceptional service to the Royal Australian Air Force, particularly in the fields of Maritime Surveillance Operations and Personnel Management.
- Group Captain Peter Frederick Norford, CSC, United Kingdom. For exceptional service in the fields of Flying Training and Aviation Safety.
- Air Commodore Kym Osley, CSC, of New South Wales. For exceptional service to the Royal Australian Air Force, particularly in the fields of Air Combat Operations and Capability Development.

=== Medal (OAM) ===
==== General Division ====
- Mr John Christopher Adams, of South Australia. For service to engineering, particularly through the standardisation of rail transport systems and executive roles with a range of professional organisations.
- Mr Dudley (Jim) Agnew, of New South Wales. For service to the community of the Clarence Valley, particularly through a range of healthcare organisations.
- Mr John MacDonald Allen, of Queensland. For service to community music, particularly through brass and concert bands, and as a mentor of young musicians.
- Councillor John Anderson, of New South Wales. For service to local government and to the community of Shoalhaven.
- Dr Robert Martin Anderson, of New South Wales. For service to medicine as a general practitioner, and to the community of the Narrabri district.
- Mr Giovanni Antonaglia, of Queensland. For service to the Italian community of Brisbane, particularly as a supporter of a range of charitable, social welfare, cultural and religious organisations.
- Dr Mary Maitland Atkinson, of New South Wales. For service to veterinary science, particularly through the Moruya Veterinary Hospital.
- Dr Peter Roderick Atkinson, of New South Wales. For service to veterinary science, particularly through the Moruya Veterinary Hospital.
- Mrs Valerie May Austin, of New South Wales. For service to the pharmacy profession, particularly as an initiator of programs to improve Indigenous health care.
- Mr Eric Arthur Ball, of Western Australia. For service to the community in the field of animal welfare, particularly through the Royal Society for the Prevention of Cruelty to Animals.
- Mr Henry Owen (Harry) Barker, of Queensland. For service to the community, particularly through Lions International and a range of ex-service organisations.
- Mr John Barry Beasley, of New South Wales. For service to the community, particularly through the surf lifesaving movement as an executive at state, regional and club level.
- Mr Mervyn John Bennett, of New South Wales. For service to equestrian sports as a competitor, coach and event coordinator.
- Mr Edgar Richard Bickford, of New South Wales. For service to the community of the Great Lakes District, particularly through graffiti removal programs, and as a mentor and supporter of young people.
- Dr Michael Wallace Birrell, of Victoria. For service to medicine as a general practitioner in the Point Lonsdale region.
- Ms Amanda Jane Boardman, of New South Wales. For service to the conservation of Australian fauna through rescue and rehabilitation of injured and distressed wildlife, and through community education programs.
- Mr Douglas James Boulton, of Queensland. For service to the surf lifesaving movement as a competitor, official and administrator, and to the community of Caloundra.
- Mr David Boyd, of New South Wales. For service to art as an innovator of design and techniques in pottery and ceramic sculpture, and as a painter.
- Mrs Rosemary Teresa Breen, of New South Wales. For service to the community, particularly to people with developmental disabilities, and to refugee and women's support organisations.
- Mrs Susi Brieger, of New South Wales. For service to education in the field of syllabus development and assessment, and to the Jewish community.
- Mrs Marianne Brockwell, of Western Australia. For service to the community as a supporter and fundraiser for a range of ex-service, charitable, health and motoring organisations.
- Mrs Carmel Dawn Brown, of New South Wales. For service to the communities of Murrumburrah and Harden, particularly through health and sporting organisations.
- Dr Grahame Brown, deceased, of Queensland. For service to dentistry as an educator in the speciality of endodontics and through the Royal Australian Army Dental Corps, and to gemmology.
- Mr Kevan Leslie Brown, of New South Wales. For service to the community of Deniliquin, particularly the welfare of ex-service personnel and their families.
- Mr Patrick Anthony Brown, of New South Wales. For service to the communities of Murrumburrah and Harden through a range of local government, sporting and health organisations.
- Mrs Helen Shiela Brustman, of Victoria. For service to the Jewish community, particularly through the Australia/Israel and Jewish Affairs Council.
- Dr Grace Jeannette Bryant, of New South Wales. For service to medicine as a Medical Officer to a range of sporting institutions and organisations and through administrative roles with professional associations.
- Mrs Adair Brice Bunnett, of Victoria. For service to the community, particularly through the preservation and promotion of local history and as a proponent of responsible urban development.
- Mrs Diane Margaret Burke, of Queensland. For service to the community particularly through the ANZAC Day Commemoration Committee of Queensland and to veterans' welfare programs as a fundraiser.
- Mr Keith Butterworth, Tasmania. For service to the community, particularly through the Australia Day Council of Tasmania, and as a supporter of a range of charitable organisations.
- Mr Paul Geoffrey Byrne, Tasmania. For service to the vocational education and training sector, particularly as a leader in reform initiatives and policy directions.
- The Reverend Father Brian Francis Byron, deceased, of New South Wales. For service to the Catholic Church through Our Lady of Peace Parish Gladesville and through a range of archdiocesan leadership roles.
- Mr John Michael Cannon, of Victoria. For service to the community, particularly through the St Vincent de Paul Society in Victoria.
- Dr Elizabeth Anne Carew-Reid, of Victoria. For service to medicine as a general practitioner, particularly through the provision of paediatric palliative care, and to the community.
- Mrs Shirley Olive Chandler, of New South Wales. For service to the community of Tamworth, as a supporter and organiser of a range of balls, concerts and débutante events.
- Mrs Elaine Chapman, of New South Wales. For service to the welfare of police officers and their families through the New South Wales Police Wives and Friends Support Group.
- Mr Reginald Stephen Chirgwin, of New South Wales. For service to the community of the Sutherland area, particularly through charitable and service groups.
- Miss Margaret Christensen, of Victoria. For service to the performing arts as a radio, stage, television and film actor, and to the community.
- Mr David Alexander Christie, of Victoria. For service to the community of Dromana, particularly through a range of cultural and service organisations.
- Mr Trevor Morton Clark, of Victoria. For service to the community, particularly through contributions to mental health research and reform.
- Mr Bruce Clarke, of Victoria. For service to the arts as a jazz guitarist and teacher.
- Mr Murray Alan Clarke, of New South Wales. For service to rowing, particularly as a coach and administrator, and to the community.
- Mr Alan Clive Cochrane, of Queensland. For service to the preservation of the marine environment.
- The Reverend Michael Edward Cockayne, of New South Wales. For service to the community of Queanbeyan, particularly through social welfare programs, and to the Anglican Church of Australia.
- Mr Ken Cohalan, of Northern Territory. For service to the business sector, particularly through the Northern Territory Chamber of Commerce.
- Mrs Ida Lena Collard, of New South Wales. For service to the community, particularly through leadership roles in women's organisations in the Port Stephens area.
- Mr Brian Michael Considine, of Victoria. For service to the community of Bendigo, particularly through the pipe band movement as a player and administrator, and to the Catholic Church.
- Mrs Beverley Josephine Cook, of Victoria. For service to the community of Gippsland East through a range of educational, health, sporting and church organisations, and to music.
- Mrs Jean Meryl Cook, of Victoria. For service to the community of Doncaster, particularly through social welfare organisations.
- Dr Peter Robert Cooke, of New South Wales. For service to the performing arts through theatrical design education, research and administration.
- Mr Paul Arthur Copeland, of Victoria. For service to veterans, particularly through the Australian Peacekeeper and Peacemaker Veterans' Association.
- Mr Barry Neil Couzner, of South Australia. For service to volleyball as an administrator and educator, and to the community.
- Colonel Arthur Reginald Craig (Retd), of Australian Capital Territory. For service to veterans and their families, particularly through the Australian Capital Territory Branch of the Returned and Services League of Australia.
- Sister Monica Josephine Crawford, of Queensland. For service to the community through the establishment and development of the Mater Health Services Archives, and to health care as an administrator and a nurse.
- Mr Keith Thomas Crellin, of South Australia. For service to classical music and musicians through artistic leadership, as an educator and mentor, and as a musician.
- Mr James Nicholas Crethar, of New South Wales. For service to the community of Lismore through a range of youth, service and progress organisations.
- Ms Kerry Anne Crowley, of New South Wales. For service to contemporary art in Australia, particularly through fostering the work of emerging artists in Australia and internationally.
- Mrs Gloria Jean Curtis, of South Australia. For service to the community through St John Ambulance Australia, particularly through cadet leadership and training roles.
- Mrs Gloria May Davey, of Queensland. For service to the community of Wynnun through service, music and sporting organisations.
- Mr Keith William Davidson, of Victoria. For service to youth through the Scouting movement.
- Mr Hilton Stanley Davis, of New South Wales. For service to the community of Blayney, particularly through retirement and aged care organisations.
- Mr John Ernest Davis, of New South Wales. For service to the community through fundraising activities to benefit the St Vincent's Hospital Heart and Lung Transplant program.
- Mr Raymond Kyrle Deane, of South Australia. For service to ex-service personnel and their families in South Australia through a range of roles with the RAAF Association.
- Mrs Elsie May Denney, of Victoria. For service to the community, particularly through service clubs and organisations relating to youth.
- Mr Allan John Devereaux, of Western Australia. For service to the community, particularly through the National Association of Extremely Disabled War Veterans.
- Mr Donovan John Ditter, of New South Wales. For service to the Australian wine industry, particularly as Chief Winemaker at Penfolds Wines.
- Mr David John Doherty, of Victoria. For service to logistics through contributions to the transport and supply chain industry, to the promotion and development of sector-wide best practice, and to Australian Rules football.
- Sister Enid Eliza Doherty, of New South Wales. For service to the community, particularly through the activities of the Sisters of Charity Outreach program.
- Mr John Francis (Jack) Dowd, deceased, of South Australia. For service to the community of Loxton, particularly to the welfare of veterans and their families.
- Mrs Doreen Florence Dunwoodie, deceased, of New South Wales. For service to the community of the South Coast, particularly through Lifeline.
- Dr Eric Mitchell (Tim) Ealey, of Victoria. For service to conservation and the environment.
- Dr Carl Wilfrid Edmonds, of New South Wales. For service to subaquatic and hyperbaric medicine as a practitioner, researcher and educator, and to the advancement of diving safety.
- Professor James Murray Ellis, of Western Australia. For service to the promotion of the information technology industry, particularly in Western Australia, and to the expansion of professional development and training opportunities.
- Mr Andrew Austin Embling, of Victoria. For service to the community of Alexandra and district through tourism initiatives and fundraising.
- Mr John Blair England, of South Australia. For service to the welfare of veterans and their families, particularly through The Royal Australian Regiment Association.
- Mr Giancarlo (John) Faustini, of Victoria. For service to the community of Ballarat, particularly through the Eureka Stockade Memorial Association and the Ballarat Italian Club.
- Mrs Gay Fetherstonhaugh, of Queensland. For service to the community of Queensland, particularly through the Country Women's Association and agricultural and horticultural societies.
- Mr Kenneth George Fewster, of Victoria. For service to cricket in Victoria.
- Dr Kenneth Ray Fielke, of South Australia. For service to the communities of rural and remote South Australia through the delivery of mental health services and programs, and contributions to professional organisations.
- Mr Stephen William Finney, of New South Wales. For service to veterans through a range of ex-service organisations in the Newcastle and Hunter region.
- Mr Reginald Harold Fitzpatrick, of Queensland. For service to the communities of Rockhampton and Yeppoon through health education, aged care welfare and the encouragement of photographic achievement.
- Mr Walter Douglas Flynn, of New South Wales. For service to the community of Dubbo through the airline industry, the Northcott Society and a range of business, sporting and service organisations.
- Mr Lawrence Edmund Fraser, MBE, of Western Australia. For service to veterans and their families, and to the Freemasonry movement.
- Mrs Mira Vivien Freshwater, of Victoria. For service to conservation, particularly through the identification and control of weeds in Sherbrooke Forest.
- Mr John Leonard Fry, of New South Wales. For service to the community through church organisations and social justice initiatives to assist prisoners and detainees.
- Mr Brian Joseph Gainsford, of New South Wales. For service to cricket in New South Wales through administrative roles at state, regional and local levels.
- Mr Lucio Galletto, of New South Wales. For service to the community through contributions as a restaurateur and author, and to the support of arts organisations.
- Mrs Rosemary Helen Gentle, of New South Wales. For service to education, particularly through the Rudolf Steiner schools.
- Dr Sydney Dennis Giddy, of Victoria. For service to medicine as an anaesthetist, and to the community of Ballarat.
- Councillor Beverley Giegerl, of New South Wales. For service to local government and to the community, particularly through the provision of library services.
- Mr Anthony Kenward Gifford, of New South Wales. For service to sport, particularly as the founder of the Australian Schools' Cricket Council, and to the community.
- Mrs Dulcie Juanita Giles, of New South Wales. For service to the community of Newcastle through ex-service organisations.
- Mrs Robyn Hope Ginn, of Queensland. For service to the arts of quiltmaking and needlecraft.
- Mr Alan Roy Gloyn, deceased, of South Australia. For service to the community of Whyalla through a range of community, service and sporting organisations.
- Mr Theofilos Gomatos, of Northern Territory. For service to the Greek community of the Northern Territory.
- Mr Clifford Scantlebury Grant, of New South Wales. For service to the arts, particularly as an opera singer.
- Mr Neville John Gray, of South Australia. For service to the community through the promotion of motorcycle road safety.
- Mrs Claire Guinness, deceased, of Western Australia. For service to the community through a range of organisations that contribute to the development and promotion of the Dunsborough area.
- Mr Vincent John Habermann, of Queensland. For service to sport, particularly cricket, and to the community of Bundaberg.
- Mrs Michelle Lucelle Hanton, of Northern Territory. For service to women's health, particularly as the founder of Dragons Abreast Australia.
- Mr Robert John Harding, of Victoria. For service to the merino sheep industry, and to the community of Nhill.
- Mr Ronald Charles Harrington, of Victoria. For service to the community of Ballarat, particularly through the Royal South Street Society.
- Mrs Diana Jean Harris, of South Australia. For service to education in the field of music.
- Mr Tressler Nixon (Mick) Harvey, of New South Wales. For service to the conservation of native flora, to education and to the community.
- Mr Michael Stewart Hatton, of New South Wales. For service to the tourism industry, particularly through the Australian Federation of Travel Agents.
- Mr Denis John Hawkins, of New South Wales. For service to the community, particularly through the provision of aged care.
- Mr Edward George Headland, of Western Australia. For service to the community of Moora and Midlands through a range of Indigenous, ex-service, sporting and community organisations.
- Mrs Elizabeth Joy Heagney, of Victoria. For service to the community through the Australian Ex-Prisoners of War Memorial.
- Mr James Bruce Henry, of Victoria. For service to education in the field of mathematics as an educator and through contributions to enrichment programs for students and professional development.
- Mrs Margaret Rose Hickey, of Queensland. For service to the community, particularly through roles with the Samford District Historical Museum.
- Mr Kenneth Frederick Hince, of Victoria. For service to the arts as a music critic, collector and historian, and to the antiquarian book trade.
- Mr William Ross Hine, of Tasmania. For service to local government and to the community of Circular Head through regional development and emergency service organisations.
- Ms Barbara Mary Hocking, of Victoria. For service to the community through advocacy and public awareness programs in the field of mental health.
- Mrs Lois Mary Hoeper, of South Australia. For service to the community through the National Council of Women and a range of service and church organisations.
- Mrs Norma Grace Holder, of New South Wales. For service to the community, particularly through the Country Women's Association of New South Wales.
- Mrs Mary Byron Holdsworth, of Victoria. For service to the community, particularly through the Altona Community Choir.
- Mr Donald Edmond Hopkins, of New South Wales. For service to horseracing in New South Wales through executive roles in industry organisations, and to the community of Taree.
- Ms Marion Rosslyn Hosking, of New South Wales. For service to people affected by domestic violence in the Manning district through accommodation and public awareness programs.
- Venerable Adrienne Lois Howley, of New South Wales. For service to the community of Maitland, particularly as a volunteer in the areas of palliative care and vision impairment.
- Mr Max Hutchinson, of Tasmania. For service to the community of Burnie through social welfare, agricultural, service and business organisations.
- Mr John Iori, of New South Wales. For service to the egg industry through roles in industry regulatory bodies, and to the community of Rouse Hill.
- Mr John Jackson, of New South Wales. For service to the optical dispensing industry, particularly through the development of education and training programs, and through leadership roles in professional organisations.
- Associate Professor Norman McIlrath James, of South Australia. For service to medicine in the discipline of psychiatry through the development and delivery of mental health services, to professional organisations, and to the community.
- Mr Kenneth Edward Jarvis, of Victoria. For service to the community of Geelong through a range of roles with local government, education, health and business organisations.
- Mr Noel Jennings, of Victoria. For service to badminton through administrative roles and as a coach and umpire.
- Mrs Mary Johnston, of New South Wales. For service to the community of the Illawarra, particularly through the William Beach Day Club.
- Dr Olive Johnston, of South Australia. For service to medicine, particularly in the area of maternal and child health, and to the community through Soroptimist International.
- Mrs Maureen Doris Jones, of South Australia. For service to the community of Gladstone through a range of sporting organisations, particularly the Rocky River Softball Club, and to youth through the Scouting movement.
- Mr Peter Francis Jones, of Western Australia. For service to music in Western Australia through the pipe band movement.
- Mr Errol Norman Jorgensen, MM, of Queensland. For service to veterans through the preservation of military history and support of ex-service organisations, and to the community of Toowoomba.
- Mr Murray Robert Juers, of South Australia. For service to the community through leadership roles in a range of aged care organisations.
- Mrs Gillian Kelly, of New South Wales. For service to the community in the area of social and local history and genealogical research through the Australian Society of the Lacemakers of Calais.
- Mr Ivan Bruce Kelly, of Tasmania. For service to the forest industries of Tasmania, particularly through the representation of country sawmillers, and to the community of Dunalley.
- Mr Philip Charles Kelly, of Victoria. For service to the shipping industry through executive roles with a range of transport and business organisations, and to the preservation of Australia's maritime history.
- Mr Saidley Peter Kelly, of New South Wales. For service to community of the Hawkesbury region through support and fundraising for a range of charitable organisations.
- Mr James Lawrence Kemsley, deceased, of New South Wales. For service to the community as a cartoonist and illustrator of the "Ginger Meggs" comic strip, through local government roles, and through the Bradman Foundation.
- Mr Percival John Keppie, of Queensland. For service to swimming through a range of executive, technical and managerial roles.
- Mrs Robyn Elizabeth Kerr, of New South Wales. For service to the Liberal Party of Australia through executive, administrative and fundraising roles.
- Ms Joanna Marie Knott, of New South Wales. For service to the community through leadership roles in organisations supporting research into the treatment of spinal cord injury and other conditions.
- Ms Maha Krayem Abdo, of New South Wales. For service to the Muslim community in Western Sydney, particularly in the areas of Muslim women's leadership training, social justice and interfaith dialogue.
- Mr Ronald George Laird, of Victoria. For service to cricket through the Bentleigh and St Kilda Cricket Clubs, and through executive roles with regional and state cricket associations.
- Mrs Beverley Ann Lamotte, of Western Australia. For service to youth through the Guide movement, and to the community through the National Council of Women of Western Australia.
- Mr Francis Henry (Frank) Lampard, of South Australia. For service to the Indigenous community through public sector roles, particularly in the field of education, and as a contributor to social welfare policy development.
- Mr Richard Hamilton Lane, deceased, of New South Wales. For service to the arts as the author of screenplays, radio and television scripts, and histories of Australian radio drama.
- Mr Andrew Gabor Lang, of New South Wales. For service to the law, particularly in the field of property and conveyancing law, as an author and educator, and to the community.
- Mr David Stanley Lawry, of South Australia. For service to arboriculture and the environment, particularly through research and support for sustainable plantings in the urban landscape, and to the community through the Avenues of Honour project.
- Mr Allan Andrew Lawson, of South Australia. For service to youth, particularly through fundraising for programs supporting young people at risk, and to education.
- Mr Raymond Charles Lee, of New South Wales. For service to education and to the community through The Scots College Pipes and Drums.
- Mr Terence Henry Legge, of New South Wales. For service to the community of Yass, particularly in the areas of health and aged care.
- Mr Edward McGregor Lennie, of Western Australia. For service to football as a referee.
- Mr Michael Andrew Lewis, of New South Wales. For service to the performing arts as an operatic baritone, to the education and mentoring of young singers, and to the community.
- Mr Richard Frederick Lornie, of New South Wales. For service to education, particularly as the Headmaster of Central Coast Grammar School and through administrative roles in the independent school sector.
- Mr Andrew Brantley Lu, of Australian Capital Territory. For service to the arts through a range of administrative roles, and to the community.
- Mr James Humphrey Lucey, of Queensland. For service to education through leadership, teaching and rugby coaching roles.
- Mr Christopher John Lusted, of Tasmania. For service to the community of Ulverstone through music.
- Ms Wilma Christine McBain, of Western Australia. For service to the community through the care and support of children requiring craniofacial plastic and reconstructive surgery. Coordinator of the Cleft Lip and Palate Service, since 1988 and the Cranio-Maxillo-Facial Unit, since 1993.
- Mr Ian George McClelland, of Victoria. For service to agriculture, particularly through the development of sustainable crop production systems, and innovative farming and land management practices.
- Mrs Beverley Ruth McClymont, of New South Wales. For service to the preservation and promotion of local history through a range of roles with historical societies.
- Mr Alan Alexander McCray, of Queensland. For service to the community, particularly with Rotary International, and to business through a range of roles with export, freight and food manufacturing organisations.
- Mrs Patricia Anita McDougall, of New South Wales. For service to nursing, particularly in the area of trauma and injury management, to nurse education, and to professional organisations.
- Mrs Denise Frances McGill, of Victoria. For service to the community through local government and the Parliament of Victoria.
- Mrs Sandra Mary McGrady, of Queensland. For service to the community of Mount Isa through charitable, service and cultural organisations.
- Dr John Joseph McGuinness, RFD, of New South Wales. For service to medicine in the field of anaesthesia, to medical education, and through the provision of humanitarian assistance to communities in the Asia-Pacific region.
- Mrs Enid Jean McIlraith, of New South Wales. For service to the Indigenous community of the Manly, Warringah and Pittwater regions through the promotion of reconciliation.
- Colonel Kenneth Stuart McKenzie, MBE DSM (Retd), of Queensland. For service to the welfare of ex-service personnel and their families through roles with the Returned and Services League of Australia.
- Mrs Elizabeth May McKerlie, of Victoria. For service to young people, particularly through the Scouting movement, and to the community of Bendigo.
- Mr George McLelland, of New South Wales. For service to the community through health, service, civic and sporting organisations.
- Ms Evol Gayle McLeod, of Australian Capital Territory. For service to the arts as an administrator and advocate, and to the community of Canberra.
- Mr Tom Walker McLucas, BEM, of Queensland. For service to the community of Bundaberg, particularly through the Returned and Services League of Australia, and to the sport of cycling.
- Ms Janne Christine McMahon, of South Australia. For service to the community in the area of mental health advocacy, particularly for private mental health consumers and carers.
- Mr John Terrence McMahon, of New South Wales. For service to cricket in New South Wales, particularly through administrative and coaching roles.
- Mr Aubrey Francis (Frank) McPherson, of Northern Territory. For service to Rugby League football in the Northern Territory.
- Mr Carey Howard McQuillan, deceased, of New South Wales. For service to ex-service personnel and their families through a range of veterans' groups and activities.
- Mr Peter John McWilliam, of New South Wales. For service to the community through a range of roles with organisations that support people with Parkinson's disease and their families.
- Mr John Richard Mace, of New South Wales. For service to the community of Lismore through the New South Wales Rural Fire Service and the Lismore Uniting Church.
- Mr Kenneth Mackay, of New South Wales. For service to the community of Nowra, particularly through the Nowra Town Band.
- Dr Patricia Mackay, of Victoria. For service to medicine in the field of clinical anaesthesia, particularly as a contributor to the improvement of quality and safety of patient care, and to the community.
- Mr Phillip Falk Maisel, of Victoria. For service to the community through the Jewish Holocaust Museum and Research Centre.
- Ms Margaret Ann Maloney, of South Australia. For service to international humanitarian aid through the provision of volunteer nursing services in developing countries.
- Mr Laurence William Marchant, of New South Wales. For service to the community of Grafton through a range of financial, medical and educational organisations.
- The Reverend Barry John May, of Western Australia. For service to the community, particularly through chaplaincy roles with the Western Australia Police Service and veterans' organisations.
- Mrs Charlene Stuart Meade, of New South Wales. For service to people with a disability, particularly through rehabilitation and support services.
- Mr Kryn Jan Meerman, of Tasmania. For service to the community, particularly through a range of roles in the health sector.
- Mr Kevin Alexander Meyer, of New South Wales. For service to the community through a range of roles in welfare, charitable, sporting and service organisations, and to the banking industry.
- Mr Gordon Stewart Millar, of Tasmania. For service to the community of the Longford area through a range of roles with sporting, civic, church and local government organisations.
- Mrs Avis Jean Miller, of South Australia. For service to education, particularly as a supporter of information technology studies and through roles with professional associations, and to the community of Port Elliot.
- Mr John Victor Miller, of New South Wales. For service to World War II veterans, particularly though the recognition of under-age servicemen.
- Mr John Alexander Millroy, of Queensland. For service to the horseracing industry, to tourism, and to the community.
- Ms Nancy Jane Milne, of New South Wales. For service to the legal sector, particularly as an insurance lawyer, and to the community.
- Ms Valerie Anne Milne, of Western Australia. For service to the community of Albany, particularly through the preservation of local history and heritage.
- Mr David Charles Minnis, of Victoria. For service to primary industry, particularly to the horticultural sector, as a contributor to national policy development and through the promotion of Australian exports.
- Mrs Dianne Margaret Mitchell, of Australian Capital Territory. For service to the Australian War Memorial and to the community through the Voluntary Guides programme.
- Mr Noel Paul Mitchell, of New South Wales. For service to the community of Cessnock, particularly through health care organisations.
- Mrs Susan Kathrine Mitchell, deceased, of New South Wales. For service to the community, particularly through a range of roles with organisations in the farming, regional development and health sectors.
- Mrs Barbara Annette Morgan, of Victoria. For service to the community through a range of lifesaving organisations.
- Associate Professor David Allan Morgan, of Queensland. For service to medicine as an orthopaedic surgeon, particularly through the establishment of the Queensland Bone Bank.
- Mr Michael David Morton-Evans, of New South Wales. For service to the community, particularly through a range of roles with organisations that support young people and those with a disability, and to local government.
- Mr Alfred George (Alf) Moufarrige, of New South Wales. For service to business and to the community, particularly through support for cancer research and a range of charitable organisations.
- Ms Judith Ann Munday, of Queensland. For service to the welfare of ex-servicewomen, and to the community.
- Mr Russell Alexander Murray, of New South Wales. For service to the community of Sussex Inlet, particularly through aged care and service organisations.
- Mr Franklyn William Nankervis, deceased, of Victoria. For service to the communities of Hurstbridge and Arthurs Creek through a range of veterans' welfare, municipal and service organisations.
- Mr Steven Peter Nemes, of New South Wales. For service to the community, particularly through Mount Sinai College and as a supporter of diabetes research.
- The Reverend Canon Brian Charles Newing, of Western Australia. For service to the Anglican Church in Western Australia, and to the community of Bunbury through roles with a range of aged care, educational and social welfare organisations.
- Mr Ben Buntha Nhem, of New South Wales. For service to the Cambodian community in New South Wales and to the Cambodian International Network for Peace and Reconciliation.
- Mr Maxwell Alan Nixon, deceased, of New South Wales. For service to the community, particularly through roles with Lions Clubs International Australia.
- Mr Terence John Noonan, of Western Australia. For service to agriculture, particularly through the Western Australian Farmers Federation, and to the community of Katanning.
- Ms Susan Anne Norrie, of Queensland. For service to the nursing profession, and to the community through a range of leadership and advisory roles.
- Mrs Susan O'Connor, of New South Wales. For service to the community as a foster parent and through training and support services for foster carers in New South Wales.
- Mrs Pearl Margaret Ogden, of Northern Territory. For service to the community in the Northern Territory, particularly as an historian and author, and through heritage conservation roles.
- Mr Stephen Gordon O'Grady, of New South Wales. For service to athletes with intellectual disabilities through the New South Wales Branch of the Law Enforcement Torch Run Committee for the Special Olympics.
- Mrs Jean Lydia Oldham, of Western Australia. For service to the community, particularly through Zonta International and the Royal Perth Hospital.
- Mr Richard Kenneth Osborne, of New South Wales. For service to the community through the Australian Volunteer Coast Guard Association and Rural Fire Services.
- Mrs Anne-Louise Oystragh, of New South Wales. For service to the Jewish community through a range of roles with the Central Synagogue.
- Mr Colin Duncan Pace, of Queensland. For service to the community of the Rollingstone district, and through leadership in the pineapple growing industry.
- Mr James Lawrence Paterson, of New South Wales. For service to skiing as a Paralympics and Disabled World Cup Ski Championships medallist.
- Mrs Marie Patterson, of New South Wales. For service to the community through the Australasian Charge Syndrome Association.
- Mr Kenneth Peters, of Queensland. For services to the community, particularly through the Lions Club of Mooloolaba and the Maroochydore Branch of The Cancer Council, Queensland.
- Mr Richard Isaac Pilpel, of Western Australia. For service to the printing industry in Western Australia, and to the Jewish community.
- Mr David Alexander Piper, of New South Wales. For service to the community, particularly through surf lifesaving in New South Wales, and through support for rehabilitation services and wheelchair sports.
- Mr David Evan Pitt, of New South Wales. For service to the community of Newport, particularly through Rugby Union football, and as a contributor to the newsagency industry in New South Wales.
- Mr Lawrence James (Laurie) Prandolini, of New South Wales. For service to marine engineering, particularly through executive roles in professional organisations.
- Mr Max Pringle, of New South Wales. For service to the community of Narrabri through a range of agricultural, aged care, historical and social welfare organisations.
- Mr Ronald Samuel Raab, of Victoria. For service to the community through roles with diabetes care organisations, particularly through the development of humanitarian programs with Insulin for Life Australia.
- Mr John David Radcliffe, of Tasmania. For service to the communities of Moonah and Glenorchy through volunteer work with a range of organisations.
- Ms Pamela Apolonia Rajkowski, of South Australia. For service to the community through research into the history of the Afghan and Aboriginal cameleers in Australia.
- Dr John Philip Rasmussen, of New South Wales. For service to heritage conservation, particularly through the New South Wales Branch of the National Trust of Australia, and to the arts.
- Dr Richard Rawson, of New South Wales. For service to the community as an ophthalmologist, to Indigenous health, and through humanitarian aid in developing countries.
- Dr Con Scott Reed, of New South Wales. For service to medicine in the areas of oncology and haematology as a clinician, researcher and executive member of professional associations.
- Mrs Anne Lloyd Rees, of New South Wales. For service to women, particularly through the Country Women's Association, and to the community of Cootamundra.
- Mrs Robyn Margaret Richards, of New South Wales. For service to people with vision impairment through Retina Australia.
- Mrs Caroline McPherson Richardson, of Victoria. For service to community health through the Australian Red Cross Victoria.
- Mr Bruce Norman Robertson, of New South Wales. For service to the community, particularly through the Keep Australia Beautiful Program.
- Ms Jeanette Margaret Robertson, of Western Australia. For service to nursing and to the community through athletics, the Perth Zoo Docent Association and other voluntary roles.
- Mrs Margaret Ruth Rogers, of New South Wales. For service to the community, particularly through voluntary work with the Taree and District Eisteddfod Society.
- Mr Luciano (Charlie) Rossetti, of Victoria. For service to aged care, to local government, and to the community of Pakenham.
- Mrs Maureen Agnes Rudge, of Tasmania. For service to occupational therapy and vocational rehabilitation in Tasmania, and to the community in a range of voluntary roles.
- Mrs Dianne Maria Sackelariou, of New South Wales. For service to the community through support and fundraising for a range of charitable organisations, and to mental health nursing.
- Mr Victor Sahade, of New South Wales. For service to the Lebanese community, particularly through the Maronite Church.
- Professor Philip Neil Sambrook, of New South Wales. For service to medicine, particularly as a researcher and clinician in the fields of rheumatology and osteoporosis.
- Ms Carolyn Jean Santagiuliana, of Queensland. For service to the community of Redland Shire through a range of welfare, health, sporting and cultural organisations.
- Miss Lavinus Monica Schneider, of South Australia. For service to nursing in South Australia and to health care in developing countries.
- Mr Geoffrey Edwin Secker, of Victoria. For service to the community, particularly through the Portsea Camp, Apex Australia and Lions International.
- Mr Desmond John Seymour, of Western Australia. For service to the community of Miling, particularly through a range of agricultural, local government, sporting and civic organisations, and to Australian Rules Football in Western Australia.
- Mr Ronald Charles Shattock, of South Australia. For service to the national caravan park industry and tourism in South Australia, particularly through the West Beach Trust.
- Mr Stuart Anthony Silbert, of Western Australia. For service to the Jewish community through a range of aged care, commercial, educational and charitable organisations.
- Mr Philip John Sketchley, of New South Wales. For service to the community of Newcastle and the Hunter Valley area through music as a performer, director, fundraiser and teacher.
- Mr Geoffrey Albert Smith, of New South Wales. For service to the community, particularly through the Bathurst District Historical Society and the Bathurst Show Society.
- Mrs Katherine Anne Smith, of New South Wales. For service to the community through fostering peaceful conflict resolution and the promotion of interfaith understanding.
- Mr Malcolm Richard Smith, of New South Wales. For service to the community through fostering peaceful conflict resolution and the promotion of interfaith understanding.
- Mr Paul Stuart Snell, of New South Wales. For service to the community of Coogee, particularly ex-service personnel and their families, and as a fundraiser.
- Mrs Joan Edith Spence, of Victoria. For service to the welfare of veterans and their families, particularly through the Noble Park Women's Auxiliary of the Returned and Services League of Australia.
- Mr Arthur Roland Squire, of Queensland. For service to the community of Chinchilla, particularly in the area of aged care.
- Mr Kevin Harold Stanford, of New South Wales. For service to the surf lifesaving movement as a competitor, coach and administrator at local, state and national levels.
- Dr Alan Wesley Stephens, of Australian Capital Territory. For service as an historian of the Royal Australian Air Force and a contributor to the development of air power strategy and doctrine.
- Mr Henry Ludwell (Harry) Stephenson, of New South Wales. For services to the community of the Central Coast through a range of organisations, particularly the Terrigal Senior Citizens' Association.
- Mr Richard Andrew Stevens, of Queensland. For service to the fishing industry, particularly through fisheries management.
- Mr Daniel Malcolm Stewart, of New South Wales. For service to the community, particularly through the Meniere's Research Fund and Merniere's Support Group of New South Wales.
- The Reverend Neville Thornley Stewart, of South Australia. For service to the community of north and west Adelaide, particularly through social welfare roles within the Uniting Church in Australia.
- Mrs Tracy Anne Stockwell, of Queensland. For service to sport as an administrator and proponent of sporting opportunities for women.
- Mr Richard Alvin Stubbs, of Victoria. For service to people with severely impaired mobility in the Mornington Peninsula area through the establishment of the Beyond Disability interactive communication program.
- Mr Thomas Raymond Sullivan, of Queensland. For service to local government and to the community of the Goondiwindi Shire.
- Mrs Verlie June Sullivan, of New South Wales. For service to people with Parkinson's disease and their carers, particularly in the Newcastle and Hunter Valley area.
- Mrs Shirley Gladys Swan, of Victoria. For service to swimming as an instructor, coach and mentor, and to the community of Swan Hill.
- The Reverend Dr Robin Taylor, of Western Australia. For service to the community as a chaplain, pastoral care coordinator and counsellor in Perth and the south-west region of Western Australia.
- Venerable Phuoc Tan Thich, of Victoria. For service to the Buddhist and Vietnamese communities in Victoria, and through support for a range of charitable organisations.
- Mr David George Thomas, of Queensland. For service to youth through the Scouting movement, the Duke of Edinburgh's Awards scheme and organisations that support young people with a disability.
- Professor Robert J. S. Thomas, of Victoria. For service to medicine through surgical oncology and cancer services in Victoria.
- Mr Donald Thomas Thompson, of Victoria. For service to the community of Rochester through a range of community organisations and activities.
- Mr John Ellis Thornton, of New South Wales. For service to the community of Finley, particularly through service and sporting organisations.
- Dr Ross Maxwell Toll, of New South Wales. For service to the community through fundraising and executive roles with the Children's Cancer Institute of Australia.
- Miss Shirley Treacy, of Queensland. For service to dance, particularly through the establishment of the Queensland Dance School of Excellence, and as an examiner and teacher.
- Mr Bruce Raymond Trewartha, of Australian Capital Territory. For service to youth, particularly through the Tuggeranong Valley Cricket Club and Scouts Australia.
- Mrs Dorothy Mae Truscott, of Queensland. For service to the community through the Bundaberg Blind and Vision Impaired Persons' Friendship Club and fundraising for organisations supporting children with a hearing impairment.
- Mr Robert Henry Truscott, of Queensland. For service to the community through the Bundaberg Steam Tramway Preservation Society and fundraising for organisations supporting children with a hearing impairment.
- Dr Warwick John Vaughan, of New South Wales. For service to education through the Primary English Teaching Association, contributions to curriculum development and public administration.
- Mr Ian Baker Wall, of South Australia. For service to business, particularly through the design and manufacture of electronic communication equipment, and to the community through philanthropic activities.
- Ms Sally Louise Waterford, of New South Wales. For service to the community of the Southern Highlands of New South Wales through roles with a range of social welfare organisations.
- Mrs Daphne Isobel Wells, of Australian Capital Territory. For service to senior citizens in the Canberra community, particularly through the coordination of social activities.
- Professor David Lawrence Wells, of Victoria. For service to forensic medicine and to the development of educational and training programs.
- Mr William Leslie (Les) Wells, of Australian Capital Territory. For service to senior citizens in the Canberra community, particularly through the coordination of social activities.
- Mr Raymond Douglass Wheatley, of New South Wales. For service to boxing as an administrator, judge and referee, and through contributions to publications.
- Ms Anne-Marie White, of Queensland. For service to the promotion of women's sport, particularly through journalism and advisory roles.
- Mr Peter John White, of Queensland. For service to the community through contributions to veterans, youth and civic organisations, and to the foundation construction industry.
- Mrs Margaret Aitken Wilke, of Queensland. For service to women through the Queensland Country Women's Association.
- Mr Geoffrey Line (Geoff) Wilkinson, of Victoria. For service to the community through the introduction and establishment of crime prevention initiatives, particularly the Crime Stoppers program.
- Mr Peter Wilkinson, of Western Australia. For service to the automotive industry, particularly through the development of accredited motor body repair training and apprenticeship schemes.
- The Reverend Dr Raymond Keith Williamson, of New South Wales. For service to the promotion of ecumenism and to community welfare, particularly through collaborative projects with the government to establish affordable housing.
- Dr Neville Beaumont Wilmer, of Queensland. For service to medicine and to the community of Gympie, particularly through the development of medical services and the Returned and Services League of Australia.
- Mr Darrell Albert Wilson, of Tasmania. For service to the community of Wynyard through a range of community organisations.
- Mr Graham John Wilson, of New South Wales. For service to the community of Armidale through roles in heritage organisations.
- Ms Coralie Faye Wood, of Australian Capital Territory. For service to the entertainment industry in the Australian Capital Territory.
- Mr Ian John Woodcock, of New South Wales. For service to the community of Lightning Ridge, particularly through aged care, local government and sporting organisations.
- Lieutenant Colonel Douglas Morris Wyatt, RFD (Retd), of Tasmania. For service to the community, particularly through the preservation of Tasmanian military history, and executive roles in a range of defence reserve organisations.

==== Military Division ====
Navy

- Lieutenant Sean Lyle Feenan, of Western Australia. For meritorious service in engineering postings in the Royal Australian Navy, particularly during seagoing appointments in HMA Ships Tobruk and Anzac.
- Chief Petty Officer Robert Mark Glover, of New South Wales. For meritorious service as a Chief Petty Officer Electronic Technician in the Royal Australian Navy.
- Lieutenant Gerrard Leslie Hoctor, of Victoria. For meritorious service to the Royal Australian Navy in the field of Communications and Information Systems.

Army

- Warrant Officer Class One Allan John Beatty, of Victoria. For meritorious service in the performance of duty as the Regimental Sergeant Major of 5th Brigade Administrative Support Battalion, 3rd Combat Service Support Battalion and Army Logistic Training Centre.
- Warrant Officer Class One Kenneth John Bullman, of New South Wales. For meritorious service as the Platoon Sergeant Major of 13 Military Police Platoon, Company Sergeant Major of the 1st Military Police Company, and the Regimental Sergeant Major of the 1st Military Police Battalion.
- Warrant Officer Class One David Charles Cross, of Queensland. For meritorious service to Army Aviation as Regimental Sergeant Major, 5th Aviation Regiment, and Regimental Sergeant Major, Army Aviation Training Centre.
- Warrant Officer Class One Lynne Foster, of Queensland. For meritorious service as the Transport Warrant Officer Class One of the Headquarters 3rd Brigade, the Regimental Sergeant Major of the 9th Force Support Battalion, and the inaugural Regimental Sergeant Major of the Force Level Logistic Asset – Middle East Area of Operations.
- Warrant Officer Class One Kenneth Charles Morris, of Queensland. For meritorious service as the Regimental Sergeant Major of 4th Battalion, The Royal Australian Regiment (Commando) and the Special Forces Training Centre.
- Warrant Officer Class One Stanley Francis Paulson, of New South Wales. For meritorious service as a Regimental Sergeant Major in the Australian Regular Army and the Army Reserve.
- Warrant Officer Class One Robert James Thompson, of Victoria. For meritorious service as the Regimental Sergeant Major of 7th Field Regiment, Royal Regiment of Australian Artillery, 4th Field Regiment, Royal Regiment of Australian Artillery, and Career Manager Royal Regiment of Australian Artillery.

Air Force

- Warrant Officer Anthony James McDermott, of Australian Capital Territory. For meritorious service as Warrant Officer Engineering at Number 75 Squadron and Number 79 Squadron, and as Maintenance Training Manager within the New Air Combat Capability Integrated Project Team.
- Flight Lieutenant David Warren Slattery, CSM, of Australian Capital Territory. For meritorious service as the Warrant Officer-in-Charge of Number 278 Squadron, and as Warrant Officer Engineering at Number 76 Squadron.

== Public Service Medal (PSM) ==
Public Service Medal ribbon

=== Australian Public Service ===
- Mr John Forrest Boersig, of Australian Capital Territory. For outstanding public service in the delivery of law and justice services to Indigenous Australians.
- Ms Adele Michelle Byrne, of Victoria. For outstanding public service in the establishment and administration of the Federal Magistrates Court of Australia.
- Dr Teresa Yuk Ching, of New South Wales. For outstanding public service in the field of audiology as a researcher, clinician, innovator and professional.
- Mr Mark John deWeerd, of New South Wales. For outstanding public service in implementing the Council of Australian Governments' Whole of Government Indigenous Trial in the Murdi Paaki region.
- Ms Mary Frances Durkin, of Australian Capital Territory. For outstanding public service in developing the Immigration Ombudsman function and improving the integrity of the immigration detention program.
- Ms Andrea Louise Flanagan, of Queensland. For outstanding public service in the provision of advice and assistance to veterans and their families, particularly in instances of death or major injury to members of the Australian Defence Force.
- Miss Stephanie Claire Foster, of New South Wales. For outstanding public service in the provision of high level policy advice to government in relation to the deployment of Australian military personnel on overseas operations.
- Ms Merrie Elizabeth Hennessy, of Australian Capital Territory. For outstanding public service in the development and implementation of superannuation regulation and legislation.
- Mr Andrew Ronald Lesbirel, of Australian Capital Territory. For outstanding public service in the development of new technical solutions to improve online service delivery in Centrelink.
- Mr Damian Francis Miley, of Queensland. For outstanding public service in managing projects under the Land and Sea Management Strategy for Torres Strait.
- Mr William Peel, of Australian Capital Territory. For outstanding public service to the Australian business community, particularly through his leadership of AusIndustry.
- Ms Sally Michelle Riley, of New South Wales. For outstanding public service in the development of initiatives that have increased the participation of Indigenous Australians in the film and television industries.
- Mr Trevor Michael Sutton, of Australian Capital Territory. For outstanding public service in managing the Child Support Agency's reform agenda, "Building a Better CSA".
- Mr Steven John Swift, of Australian Capital Territory. For outstanding public service in the regulation and promotion of aircraft structural safety.
- Mr John Leslie Williams, of Victoria. For outstanding public service in the successful settlement and participation of both established and emerging migrant communities in Australia.

=== New South Wales Public Service ===
- Ms Tarryn Kay Bracken, of New South Wales. For outstanding public service in the delivery of speech pathology services in the Illawarra region.
- Deputy Superintendent Gordon James Casey, of New South Wales. For outstanding public service in the delivery of correctional services, particularly at the Long Bay Complex of Prisons.
- Mr Benjamin Paul Chard, of New South Wales. For outstanding public service, particularly in the Hunter region.
- Mrs Beverley Ann Creagh, of New South Wales. For outstanding public service, particularly to New South Wales Fire Brigades and the Newcastle community.
- Ms Denise Gloria Darlow, of New South Wales. For outstanding public service as Private Secretary to eminent statesmen.
- Ms Dianne Mary Duff, of New South Wales. For outstanding public service in the development of performing arts within the public education system in New South Wales.
- Mr Robert John Gallagher, of New South Wales. For outstanding public service in the area of government advertising and information.
- Mr Lindsay Bernard Gilligan, of New South Wales. For outstanding public service, particularly as the Director of the Geological Survey of New South Wales.
- Mr Paul Joseph Henry, of New South Wales. For outstanding public service, particularly to the Inverell Shire Council.
- Mr Richard Runga Matenga, of New South Wales. For outstanding public service to the Department of Corrective Services, particularly the Indigenous community.
- Captain Timothy James Turner, of New South Wales. For outstanding public service to the Port of Newcastle.

=== Victorian Public Service ===
- Mr Kelvin John Anderson. For outstanding public service in the development and service delivery of correctional services in Victoria.
- Ms Sandra Jane Brien. For outstanding public service and innovative leadership in supporting Indigenous and refugee groups.
- Dr Anthony Gerard Britt. For outstanding public service to Victoria's livestock industries and animal health through the establishment of the National Livestock Identification System.
- Mr Clifford Gregory Owen. For outstanding public service in the development and implementation of a corporate governance model, and as a leader in police vehicle safety.

=== Queensland Public Service ===
- Mr Dennis Wayne Bidgood. For outstanding public service to the housing sector by streamlining administrative processes and delivering significant cost savings.
- Mrs Susan Lynette Rainbow. For outstanding public service to education, mentoring and program development for the Indigenous community of the Wide Bay Burnett region.
- Mr Terence Joseph Skehan. For outstanding public service to Queensland particularly in the field of special education.
- Mr Gary John Stevenson. For outstanding public service and leadership within local government, particularly through local government reforms.
- Mr Allan William Welsh. For outstanding public service to the development of arts and cultural infrastructure in Queensland.

=== Western Australian Public Service ===
- Dr James Macquarie Limerick. For outstanding public service to Western Australia's mineral and resource industries.

=== South Australian Public Service ===
- Dr David Anthony Cunliffe. For outstanding public service to the community of South Australia by ensuring the quality and safety of drinking water.
- Ms Patricia Anne Duhring. For outstanding public service to rural and remote communities as a Continence Nurse.
- Mr Rodney James Frisby. For outstanding public service and leadership in the field of motor vehicle registration and licensing.

== Australian Police Medal (APM) ==
Australian Police Medal ribbon

=== Australian Federal Police ===
- Assistant Commissioner Andrew Alexander Colvin, OAM.
- Assistant Commissioner Mandy Newton.

=== New South Wales Police ===
- Detective Chief Inspector James Michael Johnson.
- Deputy Commissioner Naguib Kaldas.
- Sergeant Andrew John McCoullough.
- Detective Sergeant Lindsay Matthew McGillicuddy.
- Superintendent Michael Charles Plotecki.
- Sergeant Garry John Salafia.
- Superintendent Stanley Kenneth Single.
- Senior Constable Norman William Wales.

=== Victoria Police ===
- Inspector Christopher Phillip Duthie.
- Detective Superintendent Richard Duncan Grant.
- Senior Sergeant Joy Lynette Murphy.
- Inspector Ross Hugh Smith.
- Inspector Jillian Wood.

=== Queensland Police ===
- Sergeant Arthur William Brennan.
- Detective Superintendent Peter Crawford.
- Detective Sergeant Kathryn Clare Dorge.
- Superintendent Peter Guild.
- Assistant Commissioner Brett Michael Pointing.

=== Western Australia Police ===
- Inspector Dennis Eric Collinson.
- Detective Sergeant Thomas James Doyle.
- Detective Inspector Anthony James Lee.
- Senior Aboriginal Police Liaison Officer Allan Douglas Tang Wei.

=== South Australia Police ===
- Chief Superintendent Silvio Alberto Amoroso.
- Senior Sergeant Annemieke Lyndy Baker.
- Senior Sergeant First Class Allan Mitchell McDonald.

=== Tasmania Police ===
- Inspector Robert George Gyselman.

=== Northern Territory Police ===
- Commander Katherina Laura Vanderlaan.

== Australian Fire Service Medal (AFSM) ==
Australian Fire Service Medal ribbon

=== New South Wales ===
- Mr William George Alexander, Zone Manager, Rural Fire Service.
- Mr Gerard Charles Cannon, of New South Wales Fire Brigades.
- Mr Edward William Davies, Rural Fire Brigade.
- Mr William Frederick Dunn, Group Captain, Rural Fire Brigade.
- Mr William Anderson Ewing, of New South Wales Fire Brigades.
- Mr Roy Leslie Harvey, of New South Wales Fire Brigades.
- Mr Ronald James Jollow, Senior Deputy Captain, Rural Fire Brigade.
- Mr Dennis James Saunders, Group Officer, Rural Fire Service.
- Mr James Smith, Area Commander, of New South Wales Fire Brigades.
- Mr Mark Andrew Swayn, Rural Fire Service.
- Mr Mark Robert Whybro, of New South Wales Fire Brigades.
- Mr Steven George Yorke, Chief Superintendent, Rural Fire Brigade.

=== Victoria ===
- Mr Barry Richard Barnett, Country Fire Authority.
- Mrs Patricia Elaine Bigham, Country Fire Authority.
- Mr David Miller, Manager Strategic Fire Planning, Department of Sustainability and Environment.
- Mr Paul Ritchie, Metropolitan Fire and Emergency Services Board.
- Mr Richard Kenneth (Rick) Williams, Country Fire Authority.

=== Queensland ===
- Mr Ilikena Dabea, Queensland Fire and Rescue Service Rural Fire Advisory Council.
- Mr John Frederik van Klaveren, Queensland Fire and Rescue Service.

=== Western Australia ===
- Mr David George Gossage, Fire and Emergency Services & Chief Bushfire Control Officer, Oakford Brigade.
- Mr John Campbell McMillan, Western Australia Fire Brigades.
- Mr Richard John Sneeuwjagt, Manager, Fire Management Services, Department of Environment and Conservation.
- Mr Ray Sousa, Chief Bushfire Control Officer, Training Officer and Emergency Services Coordinator, Fire and Emergency Services Authority.

=== South Australia ===
- Mr Graham Andrew Thomas, Group Officer, Country Fire Service.
- Mr Arthur Robert Tindall, Manager, Infrastructure & Logistics, Country Fire Service.

== Ambulance Service Medal (ASM) ==
Ambulance Service Medal ribbon

=== Queensland ===
- Dr Eric Desmond Elks, Clinical Support Officer, Queensland Ambulance Transport Brigade.
- Mr Leslie Joseph Steel, Communications Centre Supervisor, Queensland Ambulance Transport Brigade.

=== South Australia ===
- Mr Laidley Bruce Francis, General Manager, Emergency and Major Events, South Australian Ambulance Service.
- Mr Christopher David Lemmer, Chief Executive, South Australian Ambulance Service.

== Emergency Services Medal (ESM) ==
Emergency Services Medal ribbon

=== Victoria ===
- Mr Graeme Francis Jackman, State Emergency Service.

=== Queensland ===
- Mr Rhys William Fraser, South West Regional Director, Emergency Management Queensland.
- Mr Horace Vickers Hunt, State Training Coordinator, Volunteer Marine Rescue.

=== Western Australia ===
- Mr Rodney Alan Paterson, State Emergency Service.

=== South Australia ===
- Mr Donald John Skinner, State Emergency Service.
- Mrs Joan Stanton, South Australian Sea Rescue Squadron.

== Commendation for Gallantry ==
Commendation for Gallantry ribbon

=== Army ===
- Private Trent Ollis, of Queensland. For gallantry in action in hazardous circumstances while acting as Lead Scout of 12 Platoon, Security Task Group, 2nd Reconstruction Task Force under enemy fire at Musazai on 8 August 2007.

== Distinguished Service Cross (DSC) ==
Distinguished Service Cross ribbon

=== Army ===
- Lieutenant Colonel Harold James Jarvie, CSC, of Western Australia. For distinguished command and leadership in action as the Commanding Officer of 2nd Reconstruction Task Force in Afghanistan.
- Major Ian Douglas Langford, of New South Wales. For distinguished command and leadership in action as Officer Commanding Alpha Commando Company Group in the Special Operations Task Group, Operation Slipper, Afghanistan.

== Distinguished Service Medal (DSM) ==
Distinguished Service Medal ribbon

=== Army ===
- Major Micah Batt, of Queensland. For distinguished leadership in action as the Officer Commanding Security Detachment XI in Baghdad.
- Major Simon William Moore-Wilton, of Queensland. For distinguished leadership in action as the Officer Commanding, Security Task Group of the 2nd Reconstruction Task Force during Operation Slipper in Afghanistan.
- Lieutenant Glenn Leon Neilson, of Queensland. For distinguished leadership in action while commanding 12 Platoon, Security Task Group, 2nd Reconstruction Task Force under enemy fire at Musazai on 8 and 10 August 2007.
- Colonel John Peter Smith, of Australian Capital Territory. For distinguished leadership in action as the Australian National Representative and Chief J7 to the Multi National Division – South East, Iraq.

== Commendation for Distinguished Service ==
Commendation for Distinguished Service ribbon

=== Army ===
- Private Steven Andrew Hall, of Queensland. For distinguished performance of duties in warlike operations as a Rifleman, 12 Platoon, Security Task Group, 2nd Reconstruction Task Force during Operation Slipper.
- Sergeant Wade James McFarlane, of Queensland. For distinguished performance of duties in warlike operations as the Troop Sergeant of 3 Troop, Security Task Group, 2nd Reconstruction Task Force during Operation Slipper.
- Captain Paul Michael Sanderson, of Australian Capital Territory. For distinguished performance of duties in warlike operations as the acting Officer Commanding the Security Task Group, 2nd Reconstruction Task Force during Operation Sydney 3.
- Major Kelvin Stuart Seabrook, of New South Wales. For distinguished performance of duties in warlike operations as Operations and Training Major for the 10th Iraqi Army Division Military Transition Team during Operation Catalyst.

=== Air Force ===
- Group Captain Gavin Alexander Turnbull, of New South Wales. For distinguished performance of duties in warlike operations as the Chief of Staff Headquarters Joint Task Force 633 during Operations Catalyst and Slipper.

== Conspicuous Service Cross (CSC) ==
Conspicuous Service Cross ribbon

=== Navy ===
- Lieutenant Commander Mitchell Andrew Carmock, of New South Wales. For outstanding achievement as the Engineering Officer HMAS Sydney.
- Commodore Simon Terrence Cullen, AM, of New South Wales. For outstanding achievement as the Director Combined Planning Group, United States Central Command.
- Lieutenant Richard David Elsom, of Australian Capital Territory. For outstanding achievement as the inaugural Officer-in-Charge of the Directorate of Sailors' Career Management, Fleet Base West - Local Career Management Centre.
- Chief Petty Officer Dane Peter Rasmussen, of New South Wales. For outstanding achievement as the Ship's Technical Officer of HMAS Betano.

=== Army ===
- Colonel Michael James Kingsford, of Australian Capital Territory. For outstanding achievement as the Commanding Officer of the 4th Field Regiment, and as the Brigade Commander Rear, 3rd Brigade.
- Colonel David Michael Luhrs, of New South Wales. For outstanding achievement as the Director of Personnel Capability – Army.
- Brigadier Barry Neil McManus, of Queensland. For outstanding achievement as the Chief Staff Officer Personnel and Logistics (J1/4) Headquarters Joint Operations Command.
- Lieutenant Colonel Suzanne Melotte, of Victoria. For outstanding achievement as the Commanding Officer/Chief Instructor of the Melbourne University Regiment.
- Lieutenant Colonel Ian Philip Spiers, of Queensland. For outstanding achievement in providing medical support as Commanding Officer 2nd Health Support Battalion.
- Lieutenant Colonel Kathryn Leslei Toohey, of Australian Capital Territory. For outstanding achievement as the Deputy Director Communications, Capability Development Group in the development of Military Satellite Communications.

=== Air Force ===
- Wing Commander Jay Andrew Clarke, of Australian Capital Territory. For outstanding achievement as Deputy Director Remuneration Reform Project 2007 within Air Force Headquarters Personnel Branch.
- Group Captain Gavin Neil Davies, of Australian Capital Territory. For outstanding achievement as Officer Commanding at Number 82 Wing, Royal Australian Air Force Base Amberley.
- Flight Sergeant Craig Anthony O'Malley, of New South Wales. For outstanding achievement as a Senior Non-Commissioned Officer at Number 1 Combat Communications Squadron.
- Wing Commander Tracey Lee Simpson, of New South Wales. For outstanding achievement as Base Commander/Commanding Officer at Combat Support Unit Richmond, Royal Australian Air Force Base Richmond.

== Conspicuous Service Medal (CSM) ==
Conspicuous Service Medal ribbon

=== Navy ===
- Chief Petty Officer Raymond John Beasy, of Victoria. For meritorious achievement in recruit entry and specialist seamanship training.
- Leading Seaman Roger Cairncross Dalby, of New South Wales. For meritorious achievement as a Leading Seaman Communications Information Systems sailor in the Royal Australian Navy.
- Lieutenant Commander Grahame Andrew Falls, of Australian Capital Territory. For meritorious achievement as the Integrated Logistic Support Manager for the Landing Helicopter Dock Naval Shipbuilding Project.
- Commander Ainsley Glen Morthorpe, of Northern Territory. For meritorious achievement as the Staff Officer Grade One Operations for Operation Resolute at Headquarters Northern Command.
- Captain Nicholas James Youseman, of New South Wales. For meritorious achievement as Commanding Officer HMAS Harman.

=== Army ===
- Sergeant Lindsay Wayne Black, of Victoria. For meritorious achievement as a Squadron Sergeant Major within 1st Armoured Regiment, and as the Warrant Officer Instructor – Tank at Gunnery Wing, School of Armour.
- Major Stefan Hreszczuk, of New South Wales. For meritorious achievement as Staff Officer Grade Two, Officer Career Management, Army Personnel Agency Sydney.
- Corporal Ryan John Ingold, of Queensland. For meritorious achievement as a Rifle Section Commander of Alpha Company, the 2nd Battalion, The Royal Australian Regiment.
- Major Gordon Ross Lambie, of Victoria. For meritorious achievement as Officer Commanding and Music Director of the Australian Army Bands Sydney and Melbourne.
- Sergeant Juliet Nehi Payne, of Queensland. For meritorious achievement to the Australian Army as the Operations Sergeant at Headquarters 11th Brigade in support of Operations Relex II, Resolute and Anode.
- Warrant Officer Class Two Mark John Retallick, of Queensland. For meritorious achievement as the Company Sergeant Major of First Class at the Royal Military College, Duntroon.
- Sapper Malcolm MacCallum Stewart, of Western Australia. For meritorious achievement as a tradesman and trade mentor for the Army Aboriginal Community Assistance Program Training Team.
- Warrant Officer Class One Phillip Andrew Symmans, of Queensland. For meritorious achievement as the Regimental Quartermaster Sergeant of the 3rd Combat Signals Regiment, the 5th Aviation Regiment, the 1st Signal Regiment, and Headquarters 1st Division.
- Captain Rik Andrew Walter, of Victoria. For meritorious achievement as the Secretary of the Soldier Career Management Agency, Medical Employment Classification Review Board.

=== Air Force ===
- Sergeant Matthew Stephen Hanley, of New South Wales. For meritorious achievement as the Acting Senior Non-Commissioned Officer-in-Charge of Number 2 Operational Conversion Unit Aircraft Life Support Section.
- Wing Commander William Kourelakos, of New South Wales. For meritorious achievement as Executive Officer of Numbers 36 and 37 Squadrons.
- Squadron Leader Colin Andrew Smith, of South Australia. For meritorious achievement as Executive Officer of Number 11 Squadron.
- Group Captain Peter Neil Wood, of Australian Capital Territory. For meritorious achievement as Chief of Staff at Headquarters Air Lift Group.
