= Anthony Gifford =

Anthony Gifford may refer to:

- Anthony Gifford, 6th Baron Gifford, British hereditary peer and King's Counsel
- Anthony Gifford (cricketer), English-born Australian cricketer, British Indian Army officer and educator
