= John McMahon (Queensland cricketer) =

Australian cricketer (1932–2024)

John McMahon OAM
Personal information
- Full name: John Terrence McMahon
- Born: 18 May 1932; Five Dock, New South Wales, Australia
- Died: 22 January 2024 (aged 91); Brisbane, Queensland, Australia
- Batting: Right-handed
- Bowling: Slow left-arm orthodox
- Role: Bowler

Domestic team information
- Years: Team
- 1959/60: Queensland
- FC debut: 25 December 1959 Queensland v South Australia
- Last FC: 1 January 1960; Queensland v New South Wales

Career statistics
Competition	First-class
Matches	2
Runs scored	8
Batting average	2.66
100s/50s	0/0
Top score	4
Balls bowled	304
Wickets	1
Bowling average	185.00
5 wickets in innings	0
10 wickets in match	0
Best bowling	1/92
Catches/stumpings	1/–
- Source: CricketArchive, 10 February 2024

John Terrence McMahon OAM (18 May 1932 – 22 January 2024) was an Australian cricketer. He played in two first-class matches for Queensland during the 1959–60 Sheffield Shield season.

He was awarded the Medal of the Order of Australia (OAM) in the 2008 Birthday Honours "for service to cricket in New South Wales, particularly through administrative and coaching roles."

McMahon died on 22 January 2024, at the age of 91.
