= 1986 New Year Honours (Australia) =

The New Year Honours 1986 were various orders and honours by Queen Elizabeth II acknowledging and highlighting good work by citizens of those countries, and honorary ones to citizens of other countries. They were announced on 31 December 1985 to celebrate the year passed and mark the beginning of 1986 in Australia.

The recipients of honours are displayed here as they were styled before their new honour and arranged by honour, with classes (Knight, Knight Grand Cross, etc.) and then divisions (Military, Civil, etc.) as appropriate.

== Knight Bachelor ==
State of Queensland

- Graham McCamley, MBE
- Terry Lewis, OBE, GM, QPM, Commissioner, Queensland Police Force.

== Order of Saint Michael and Saint George ==
=== Companion ===
State of Queensland

- The Honourable Claude Wharton, MLA. For public service.

== Order of the British Empire ==
=== Commander ===
State of Queensland

- Emeritus Professor John Howard Tyrer. For services to medicine.

=== Officer ===
State of Queensland

- Dr. Peter John Falconar Grant ED, RFD. For services to the community.
- The Reverend Raymond Fletcher Hunt. For services to the community.
- Victor Barry Paul. For services to the community.
- Graham Bruce Siebenhausen. For services to industry.

State of Tasmania

- Gilbert Colville McKinlay. For services to the retailing industry.

=== Member ===
State of Queensland

- Councillor Ewen Archibald Donald Cameron. For public service.
- Bruce Alpin Campbell. For voluntary services
- James Corbett. For services to the community.
- Douglas Campbell Mactaggart. For voluntary service and services to rural industry.
- Jean May Myers. For services to education.
- Gordon Basil Rose. For services to the Aboriginal community.
- James Frederick Thomas Scrimgeour. For services to the community.

State of Tasmania

- Mollie Campbell-Smith. For services to education and to the community.
- William Winspear Terry. For public service.

=== Companion of the Imperial Service Order ===
State of Queensland

- James Alfred John Smart. For public service.

State of Tasmania

- Athol Laurence Eiszele. For public service.

=== British Empire Medal ===
State of Queensland

- Leonard Aubrey Barsby. For services to the community.
- Thomas John Bethel. For services to the community.
- Marjory Kathleen Brown. For services to war widows.
- Terence Gregory Channells, Superintendent, Queensland Police Force.
- Elizabeth Daniels. For services to the community.
- Wallace Septimus Escott. For services to the community.
- Councillor Thomas Wesley Gee. For services to local government and to the sugar industry.
- Hazel May Larard. For services to the community and to disabled people.
- Joanna Lee. For services to the community.
- Ronald Frank Schmidt. For services to the community.
- Robert James Wilson. For services to the community.

State of Tasmania

- Kevin Charles Haas. For services to the community.
- Ernest Albert McGlade. For services to the community.
- Geoffrey Bernard Martin. For services to the community.

=== Queen's Police Medal ===
State of Queensland

- Albert Thomas Pointing, Superintendent, Queensland Police Force.
