= Vittoria Coffee =

Australian coffee company

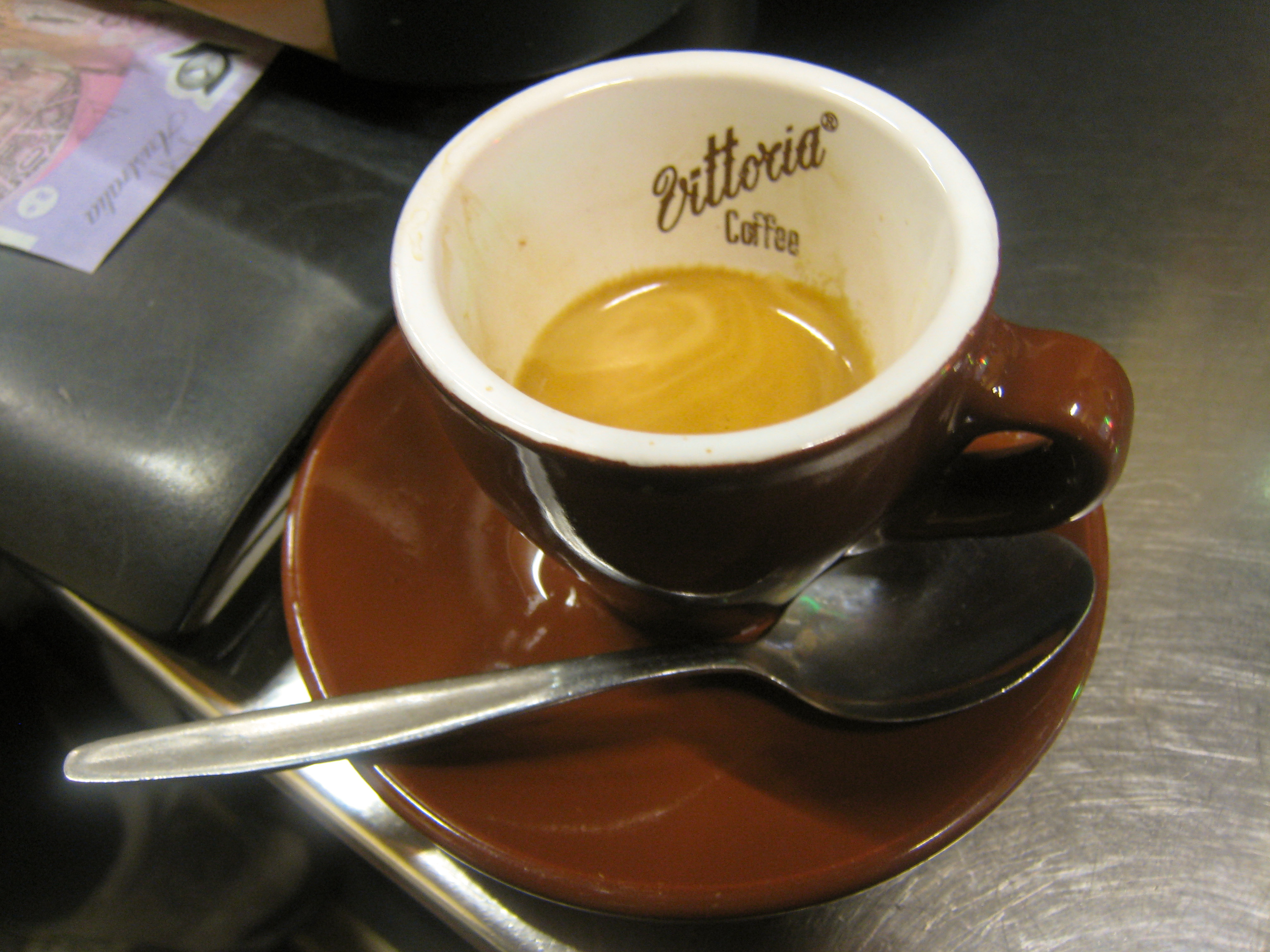
- Ristretto in Vittoria coffee cup
- Type: Private
- Industry: Coffee retail and food service
- Founded: In 1947
- Headquarters: Silverwater, Australia
- Key people: Les Schirato (CEO)
- Products: Whole bean coffee Merchandise
- Website: www.vittoriacoffee.com

Vittoria Coffee is a brand of coffee products manufactured by Vittoria Food and Beverage of Australia.

== History ==
The company Cantarella Brothers was founded in Sydney in 1947 by brothers Orazio and Carmelo Cantarella. In 1958 the brothers began roasting small amounts of premium Arabica coffee at their food importing premises in the Sydney's suburb of Haymarket, initially supplying Sydney's first Italian cafés. Carmelo died soon after and his brother bought out his shares.

Les Schirato first started working at Vittoria Coffee in 1974. He left the company, eventually married Orazio's daughter Luisa, and returned to work for Vittoria Coffee in 1981. He launched the distribution of Vittoria vacuum-packed ground coffee in Australian supermarkets, the first retail coffee brand in Australia that was not instant coffee. Orazio stepped down as CEO in 1992, succeeded by Les Schirato.

In 2010, actor Al Pacino was hired for a print and TV ad campaign for Vittoria directed by Barry Levinson and produced by Ridley Scott's RSA. Vittoria Coffee began an expansion into the United States market in 2014.

In November 2024, the Federal Court of Australia dismissed claims brought by Douwe Egberts against Vittoria Coffee alleging passing off, misleading and deceptive conduct, and trade mark infringement. The case concerned competition in the instant coffee market, including Vittoria’s 400 g freeze-dried product.

== Description ==
Les Schirato married Orazio's daughter Luisa. Les became CEO of the company in 1992, the couple Les-Luisa held 51% of the shares (by buying Orazio's shares, and Luisa's siblings Giulio and Muzio's shares), while Luisa's sister held the remaining 49%. Les and Luisa's son Rolando is the anticipated to succeed his father.

Vittoria has its own pods (including Nespresso-compatible ones) and brewing machines under the Espressotoria brand.

== See also ==
- List of restaurant chains in Australia
