= Dorothy Buckland-Fuller =

Australian humanist, feminist, migrant community and peace advocate and sociologist

Dorothy Buckland-Fuller AM, MBE
- Born: Dorothea Dimitropoulou; 21 January 1922; Port Said, Egypt
- Died: 5 July 2019 (aged 97)
- Other name: Dorothy Buckland
- Occupations: Humanist, sociologist, feminist, migrant community advocate, peace and human rights activist, peace activist
- Known for: founder, Australian Migrant Women's Association
- Notable work: Immigrant Women and Sexual Harassment at Work

Dorothy Buckland-Fuller AM, MBE (21 January 1922 – 5 July 2019) was an Australian sociologist, peace and human rights activist, migrant community advocate and humanist.

== Early life and education ==
Buckland-Fuller was born Dorothea Dimitropoulou in 1922 in Port Said, Egypt to Greek parents. Having lived for some years in England she migrated with her husband to Sydney, Australia in 1961. She studied at the University of New South Wales, completing a BA in 1969, followed by a MA Qual (Honours equivalent) in Sociology in 1972.

== Career ==
In 1974 Buckland-Fuller founded the Australian Migrant Women's Association to provide networking opportunities for migrant women.

She was appointed one of seven commissioners appointed to the Ethnic Affairs Commission of New South Wales in May 1977.

Buckland-Fuller was president of the Women's International League for Peace and Freedom in 2002–2004.

With Robyn Williams, she was joint patron of the Humanist Society of New South Wales Inc.

Buckland-Fuller died on 5 July 2019.

== Awards and recognition ==
In the 1977 Queen's Birthday Honours Buckland-Fuller was made a Member of the British Empire (MBE) "in recognition of service to the community".

In 2001 she was made a life member of the Council of the Greek Orthodox Community of Sydney and New South Wales in recognition of her 40 years' service to the Greek community. In the same year she was chosen as one of the first group of women to be inducted to the Victorian Honour Roll of Women.

She was made a Member of the Order of Australia (AM) in the 2008 Queen's Birthday Honours for "service to the community as a contributor to a range of social justice, ethnic and migrant women's organisations and through raising awareness of issues affecting women from culturally and linguistically diverse backgrounds".

One of the four tunnel boring machines used to construct the Sydney Metro West was named Dorothy in her honour.

== Works ==
- Buckland-Fuller, Dorothy (1981). Immigrant Women and Sexual Harassment at Work. Government Printer.

=== Conference papers ===
- Buckland-Fuller, Dorothy; Sociological Association of Australia and New Zealand Conference (1975 : University of Waikato, Hamilton, N.Z.) (1975), Immigrant women in Australia, U.N.S.W.]
- —; National Women's Health Conference (1975 : University of Queensland) (1975), Isolation of immigrant women in Australian society, U.N.S.W
- —; Federation of Ethnic Communities' Councils of Australia. (The aged in ethnic communities) (National Congress : 1984 : University of Melbourne) (1984), Ageing people of non-English-speaking background
- —; Latin American Women's Association Seminar (2nd : 1985 : Sydney, N.S.W.) (1985), Women of non-English speaking background in Australian society : an overview, NSW Council on the Ageing?
- —; N.S.W. Council on the Ageing; N.S.W. Council on the Ageing. (1986 : Sydney, N.S.W.) (1986), Strategies for involving ageing people of non-English speaking background in the home and community care programme
