= Albert Dadon =

Australian businessman, philanthropist, and musician (born 1957)

- Born: 1957 (age 68–69); Morocco
- Occupations: Businessman, Philanthropist, and Musician

Albert Dadon (born 1957) is an Australian businessman, philanthropist, and jazz musician who releases albums under the pseudonym Albare. He is the founder of the Australia Israel Leadership Forum.

== Biography ==
Albert Dadon was born in Morocco and grew up in Israel and France before emigrating to Melbourne, Australia in 1983. He participates in international affairs, political activism, and cultural activities within Australia and in overseas exchange programs. He is the executive chairman of the Ubertas Group, a diversified funds management and property development company.

From 1991 to 1993, Dadon was chairman of the French Chamber of Commerce in Australia (Victorian Chapter). He established "Le Concours des Vins du Victoria", a wine competition in Australia.

From 1994 to 1996, he was appointed the director of the Australia-French Foundation by Senator Gareth Evans, then the Minister of Foreign Affairs of Australia. This foundation was initiated by the prime minister, Bob Hawke, as a gift to France for the bicentennial of the French Revolution.

In 2001, Dadon was chairman of the United Israel Appeal in Victoria. In 2002, he founded and chaired the Australian-Israel Cultural Exchange (AICE), an organization launched through a Joint Declaration between the Australian and Israeli Governments. The joint declaration, announcing and supporting the establishment of AICE by Alexander Downer MP, Australian Minister for Foreign Affairs, and Binyamin Netanyahu MK, Israeli Minister for Foreign Affairs, took place simultaneously in Parliament House, Canberra and the Ministry for Foreign Affairs, Jerusalem. Dadon also publishes a quarterly magazine for AICE titled Rhapsody.

In 2018, Dadon bought a music venue in Sydney, called "The Basement."

== Awards ==
From 2003 to 2005, Dadon was chairman of the Melbourne Jazz Festival. In 2005, he brought the Umbria Jazz Festival to Melbourne, naming it "Umbria Jazz Melbourne 05". The festival attracted 135,000 visitors under the artistic direction of Carlo Pagnotta and was primarily funded by the Victorian government through Victoria Major Event Company and Arts Victoria. In 2006, Dadon was appointed the artistic director of the festival.

His appointment as artistic director resulted in the festival being renamed Melbourne Jazz. The 2007 edition featured more than 200 artists from around the world, performing in ten venues across 112 concerts. Some of the artists who played at the festival were Herbie Hancock, Chick Corea, Gary Burton and McCoy Tyner.

In 2003, Dadon founded the Australian Jazz Bell Awards (named after Australian jazz musician Graeme Bell, AO). Dadon chairs the board of The Australian Jazz Awards Limited, a not-for-profit arts organisation that governs the awards. The Bells recognize the achievements of young and established Australian jazz performers and composers.

In 2008, Dadon received an Order of Australia (AM) for service to the arts, particularly through the Melbourne Jazz Festival, for philanthropic support for cultural and charitable organisations, and for his contributions to the business.

In 2009, Dadon established the Australia-Israel Leadership Forum, which became the Australia-UK-Israel Leadership Dialogue once the UK joined in 2011.

In March 2015, Albert Dadon opened Bird's Basement, a Jazz Club in Melbourne, in association with Birdland New York. Dadon commented:

This is something that is going to be part of the cultural calendar of Melbourne.

— Albert Dadon

Dadon founded the Australia-Israel Leadership Forum in 2009. At the behest of John Spellar, a British Labour Party Member of Parliament, Dadon agreed to broaden the scope of the organization to include the U.K. The following year, at its convention in 2011, the organization was renamed The Australia UK Israel Leadership Dialogue. Tony Blair attended that year's Dialogue. The following Dialogue (2012) was held in the UK Parliament. Over the years, the Institute has hosted guest participants from Canada, the United States, and France. In 2017, the organization altered its name to its current form.

Under his stage name "Albare", Dadon is a jazz guitarist and composer. He has recorded two albums with Festival Records in Australia and produced A History of Standard Time, Joe Chindamo's first solo recording, featuring Ray Brown. His latest albums are Midnight Blues (2007), After the Rain (2009), Travel Diary (2010), Long Way (2012), The Road Ahead (2013), 2 Decades of Jazz (2014), Only Human (2015), Dream Time (2016), Urban Soul (2017), Urbanity by Urbanity (2018), Albare Plays Jobim (2020), Albare Plays Jobim Vol 2 (2021). "Albare Plays Jobim website".
