= Mollie Campbell-Smith =

Tasmanian educator

Mollie Campbell-Smith AM MBE (1917 – 7 July 2015) was a Tasmanian educator, who developed and taught curriculum in Interpersonal Relationships which was adopted by Government schools across Tasmania in 1963. She also worked to support the interests of women in the community and in the areas of health and aged care.

== Early life and education ==
Born Mollie Marsden in 1917 in Devonport, Tasmania, she moved with her family to Launceston on completion of primary school and attended Methodist Ladies College (now Scotch Oakburn College). She studied science at the University of Melbourne, then a DipEd in Tasmania, before becoming a high school teacher. She also played hockey, representing the University of Melbourne, the State of Victoria and Australia.

== Career ==
Campbell-Smith taught science at Methodist Ladies' College for 1955 until her retirement in 1986.

Outside teaching, she filled many volunteer roles, being State Commissioner of the Girl Guides, 1983-1988. She was president of the Australian Federation of University Women from 1988 to 1991. She was a long-term member of the National Council of Women of Australia Launceston and president from 1995 to 1998 and 2003 to 2007.

For many years Campbell-Smith was an RFT board member, supporting people with mental health and social issues. The Mollie Campbell-Smith Forum was established in 2013 by RFT and University of Tasmania and takes place every two years. The themes have been the social and emotional well-being of school-aged children (2013), resilience (2015) and "Bodies on the brink" (2017).

Senator Nick Xenophon credited Campbell-Smith with inspiring him to run for the Senate.

== Recognition and awards ==
- Member of the Order of the British Empire (MBE), New Year’s Day Honours 1986 "in recognition of service to the community and education".
- Launceston Citizen of the Year, 2000
- Inducted to the Tasmanian Honour Roll of Women in 2005 (its inaugural year) "for services to Education and Training, service to the Community".
- Member of the Order of Australia (AM), 2008 Queen’s Birthday Honours (Australia) for "service to the community of Tasmania, particularly through the promotion of issues that affect the interests of women and to a range of organisations involved in the areas of health and aged care".
- Rotary Paul Harris Fellow, 2013

== Personal ==
She married Lance-Bombardier Ralph Campbell-Smith, a surveyor in civilian life, in April 1942 and had three sons and two daughters. Her husband died in 1993. Campbell-Smith died in Launceston on 7 July 2015.
