= Ian Langford (cricketer) =

Australian cricketer

Personal information
- Born: 2 June 1936; Melbourne, Australia
- Died: 25 February 2017 (aged 80); Melbourne, Australia

Domestic team information
- Years: Team
- 1962: Victoria
- Source: Cricinfo, 18 April 2018

Ian Langford (2 June 1936 – 25 February 2017) was an Australian cricketer. He played one first-class cricket match for Victoria in 1962.

== See also ==
- List of Victoria first-class cricketers
