= Anthony Gifford (cricketer) =

Australia cricketer, British Army officer and educator

Personal information
- Full name: Anthony Aubrey Kenward Gifford
- Born: 19 January 1921; Paddington, London, England
- Died: 11 February 2016 (aged 95); Sydney, New South Wales, Australia
- Batting: Right-handed
- Bowling: Slow left-arm orthodox

Domestic team information
- Years: Team
- 1941/42: Europeans

Career statistics
Competition	First-class
Matches	1
Runs scored	1
Batting average	0.50
100s/50s	–/–
Top score	1
Balls bowled	234
Wickets	0
Bowling average	–
5 wickets in innings	–
10 wickets in match	–
Best bowling	–
Catches/stumpings	1/–
- Source: ESPNcricinfo, 9 November 2021

Anthony Aubrey Kenward Gifford OAM (19 January 1921 – 11 February 2016) was an English-born Australian first-class cricketer, British Indian Army officer and educator.

Gifford was born in Paddington in January 1921 and was educated at Blundell's School, with Gifford, who was a talented slow left-arm orthodox bowler playing cricket for the Kent Second XI in 1939. He served in the Second World War as an officer in the Garhwal Rifles, part of the British Indian Army. He played first-class cricket while in British India, making a single appearance for the Europeans cricket team against the Parsees cricket team in the semi-final of the 1941/42 Bombay Pentangular played at Bombay. Gifford had little success in the match, scoring a single run and going wicketless from 39 overs bowled. He was seriously injured during the war when he was involved in a traffic accident while stationed in Cyprus, with his injuries invalidating him out of the army. On advice of doctors, he emigrated to Australia in 1948, with it being suggested that the warmer climate would better suit his long-term recovery from his accident.

Soon after arriving in Australia, he found employment at Launceston Church Grammar School, before taking up a teaching post at St Peter's College in Adelaide, where one of his students was Don Bradman's son. From there he moved to Knox Grammar School in Sydney, where he was to teach for the next 32 years. While teaching at Knox, he started youth cricket in Australia by founding the Australian School Cricket Council in 1966, serving as its secretary until 1981. Gifford was also active in Australian rugby union and was a member of New South Wales Rugby Union, serving as a delegate from 1974 to 1989, in addition to being appointed treasurer of the Australian Schools' Rugby Union in 1978, which was a role he held until 1991. He was awarded the Certificate of Distinguished Services to Australian Cricket by Cricket Australia chairman Jack Clarke in 2010 for his service to cricket, in addition to being awarded the Order of Australia Medal in the 2008 Queen's Birthday Honours. Away from sport, Gifford was an active member of the Liberal Party of Australia and served as secretary of the Palm Beach branch of the party for ten years. His wife, Bunny, predeceased him in 2014, with Gifford passing away in February 2016 following a short illness.
