= 1959–60 Sheffield Shield season =

Australian cricket tournament

- Cricket format: First-class
- Tournament format: Double round-robin
- Champions: New South Wales (32nd title)
- Participants: 5
- Matches: 20
- Most runs: Bob Simpson (Western Australia) (902)
- Most wickets: Johnny Martin (New South Wales) (45)

The 1959–60 Sheffield Shield season was the 58th season of the Sheffield Shield, the domestic first-class cricket competition of Australia. New South Wales won the championship for the seventh consecutive year.

== Table ==
Team	Played	Won	1st Inns Won	Drawn	1st Inns Lost	Lost	Points
New South Wales	8	5	0	0	1	2	50
Victoria	8	4	2	0	1	1	48
Western Australia	8	3	1	0	2	2	34
Queensland	8	2	1	0	2	3	24
South Australia	8	0	2	0	0	6	8

== Statistics ==
=== Most Runs ===
Bob Simpson 902

=== Most Wickets ===
Johnny Martin 45
