= Ian Langford (soldier) =

Australian Army officer

Professor Ian Langford
- Born: 15 February 1975 (age 51); Liverpool, New South Wales
- Military career
- Allegiance: Australia
- Branch: Australian Army
- Service years: 1992–2022
- Rank: Brigadier
- Commands: Head of Land Capability (Acting) (2018–19, 2022); 2nd Commando Regiment (2014–15); Special Operations Task Group (2012–13)
- Conflicts: Operation Bel Isi; UN Truce Supervision Organization; Operation Astute; War in Afghanistan; Iraq War
- Awards: Distinguished Service Cross & Two Bars

Brigadier Ian Douglas Langford, DSC & Two Bars (born 15 February 1975) is a retired senior officer of the Australian Army. He is a Distinguished Graduate of the United States Marine Corps Command and Staff College and the School of Advanced Warfighting. Langford was the Director General Future Land Capability for the Australian Army from 2018 until 2022; and previous to that was the acting head of Land Capability. He served as commanding officer of 2nd Commando, in which role he led combat operations in Timor Leste, Afghanistan, Bougainville, Solomon Islands, Iraq, Israel, Lebanon, Syria, and the South-West Pacific; with command of Special Operations Command in Afghanistan. For his service, Langford was awarded the Distinguished Service Cross on three occasions – the only person to date to receive that honour.

== Early life and education ==
Langford was born in Liverpool, New South Wales, to a military family, moving schools frequently. He enlisted in the army immediately after completing high school in Victoria.

He returned to tertiary studies frequently in his military career; researching, teaching and writing. Langford graduated with a bachelor's degree to the Infantry Corps from the Royal Military College in 1995, having been awarded the Sword of Honour.

Langford went on to study management at Southern Cross University (2001) followed by a Master of Arts from Deakin University (2005) a Master of Defence Studies (2009) and a Master of Strategic Studies (2010) from the US Marine Corps War College and the School of Advanced Warfighting in Quantico, USA in 2009–10.

Langford has participated in post graduate studies at the Harvard Kennedy School. In 2020, he was made a Doctor of Philosophy by Deakin University.

== Military career ==
=== Peacekeeping missions ===
After graduation from Duntroon in 1995, Langford was posted to 1st Battalion, Royal Australian Regiment for four years, then moved to the commando element, 4 RAR. As a young Lieutenant, he was deployed to Rifle Company Butterworth and later the Solomon Islands.

On promotion to captain in 2002, Langford served as Deputy Operations Officer in the peacekeeping mission, Operation Bel Isi II in Bougainville. Returning to 4 RAR (Cdo) as Operations Officer, Langford organised sub-units in preparation for Operation Bastille in Iraq.

In 2004, Langford was appointed Aide-de-camp to Special Operations Commander Duncan Lewis, and deployed in 2005 to the United Nations Truce Supervision Organization in Israel, Lebanon and Syria.

=== Command in special forces ===
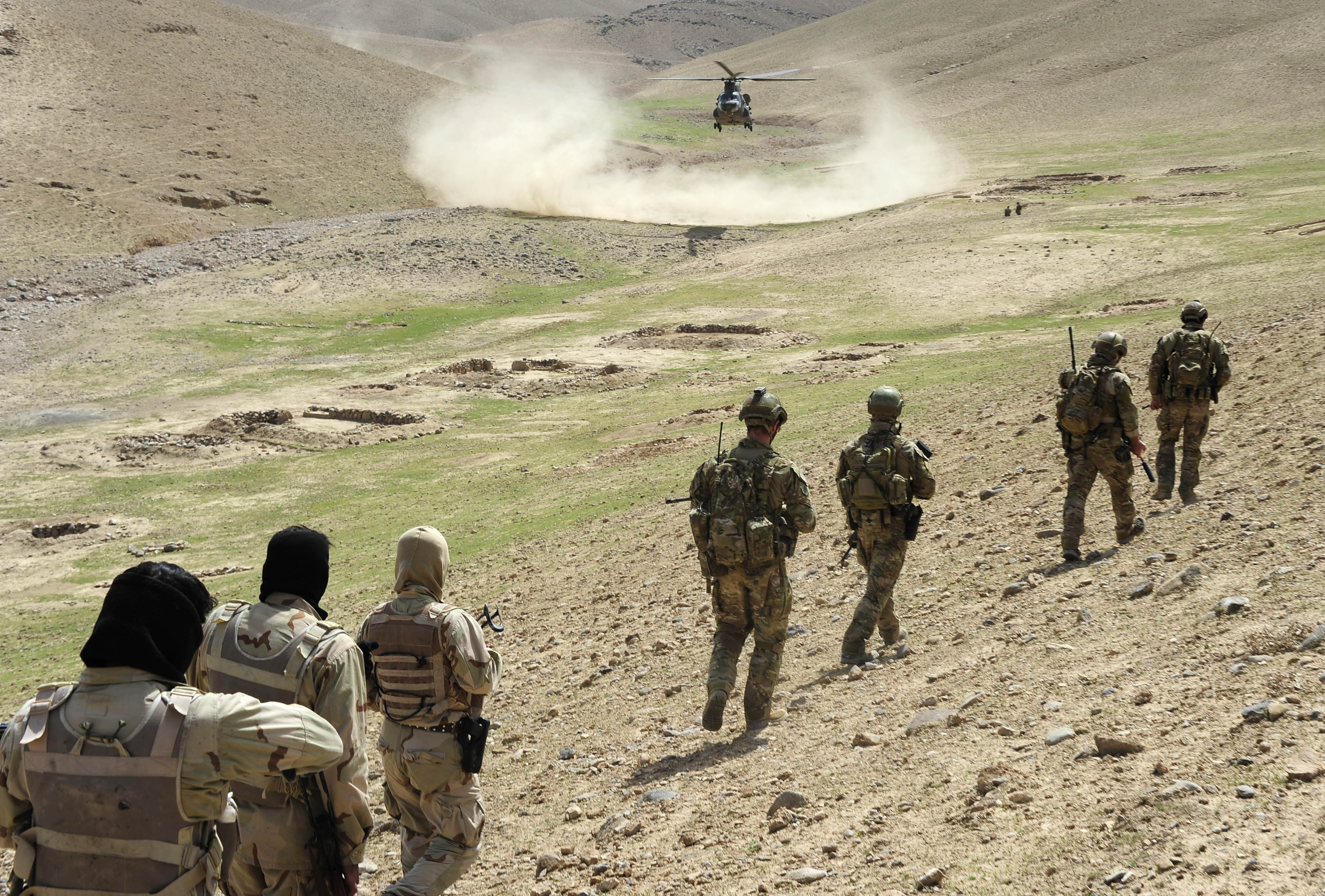
In command of Special Operations Task Group, Langford had oversight of the training and mentoring of Afghan National Army elements by 2nd Commando Regiment; seen here in Uruzgan province, Afghanistan, March 26, 2012.

Having been promoted to the rank of Major, Langford became the officer commanding for 4 RAR (Cdo), a special forces unit, from 2006 to 2007, deploying his Commando Company Group to Timor-Leste for Operation Astute, then to the South-West Pacific evacuation in Operation Quickstep.

Langford served in combat operations as the CCG Commander for the Third Phase of Operation Slipper in Afghanistan, known as Rotation IV. For his "command and leadership in action as Officer Commanding Alpha Commando Company Group" Colonel Langford was awarded the Distinguished Service Cross (DSC) in 2008. d

Following studies in the United States and promotion to Lieutenant Colonel, Langford was appointed acting Commanding Officer of 2nd Commando Regiment.

Langford returned to Afghanistan in 2011, serving as the Plans Officer at Special Operations HQ and commanded the Special Operations Task Group in Afghanistan 2012–13. For his service, he was awarded a Bar to his DSC in the 2014 Australia Day Honours, as Lieutenant Colonel I. Following this period of combat leadership, Langford wrote a major paper on Australia's special forces including on the cultural problems that seemed to be emerging, arising from some operators having a sense of being beyond accountability:

“This sense of separation from the military mass encourages the emergence of SF units that are more akin to militant clans than military organisations. If unchecked, arrogance or aloofness bred from a culture of élitism develops… [This] nurtures an unassailable belief that ‘only those who have done it know, or can be trusted, or more dangerously yet, can give direction.’”

After it was reported that members of the 2012-2013 rotation commanded by Langford were alleged to have committed 16 war crimes detailed in the Brereton Report, Langford attempted to hand back his medal, but was prevented from doing so. The Sydney Morning Herald journalist Chris Masters, who reported extensively on the misconduct of elements of the SASR in Afghanistan, said it was a matter of misfortune that these men were in the rotation when Langford was given command, and that he is considered to be not at fault by Justice Brereton.

Langford became the Staff Officer for Strategy in the Directorate of Army Research and Analysis before being selected to command the 2nd Commando Regiment, including a further deployment to Iraq as CO SOTG-Iraq. This service was recognised with a promotion to full Colonel; and with a Second Bar to his DSC in early 2016, "for distinguished leadership in warlike operations as part of a Special Operations Force on Operation Okra from September 2014 to February 2015."

=== Army planning roles ===
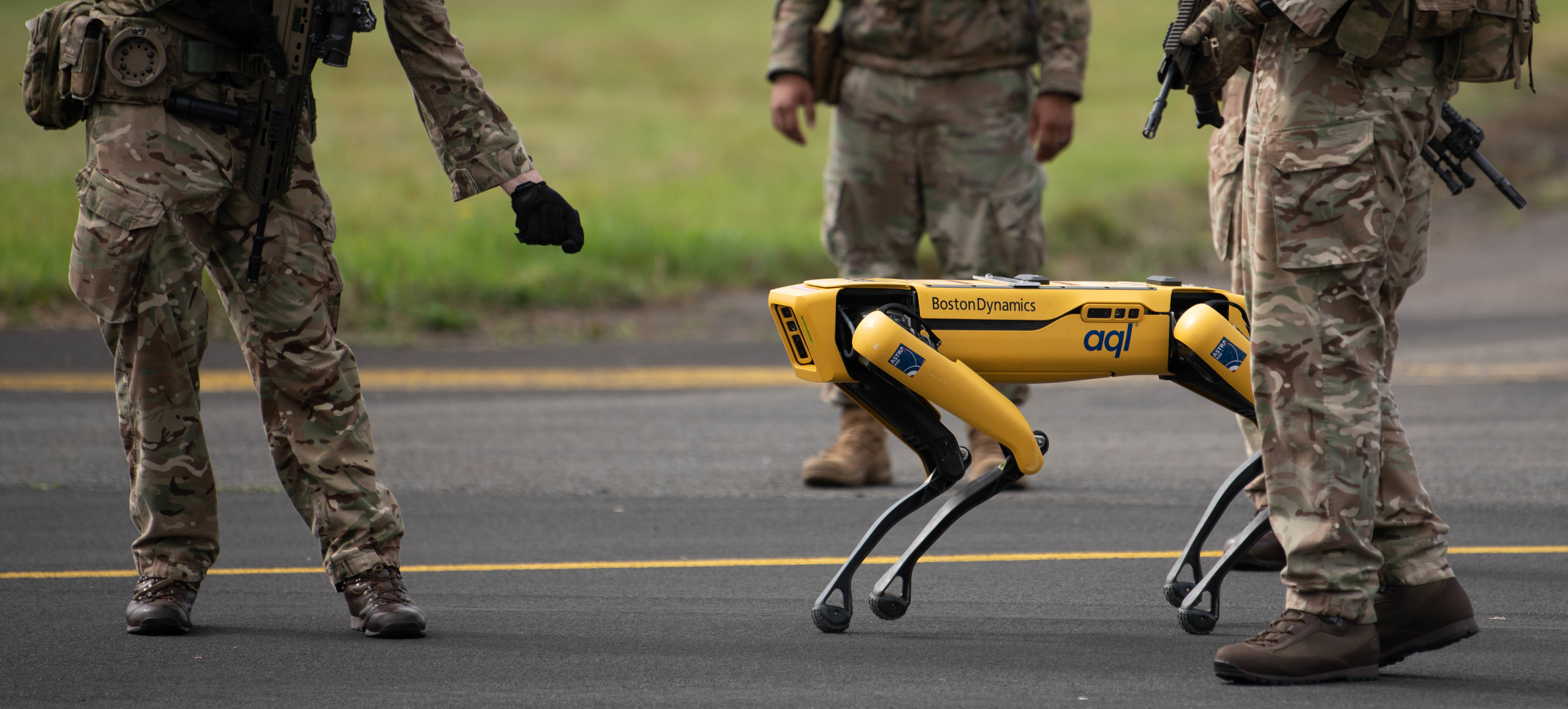
Langford has been an advocate for robotic and autonomous systems, such as the Boston Dynamics spot robot.

Away from combat, his identity no longer suppressed, Langford began researching, teaching and presenting from 2016. In one presentation Langford stressed the crucial nature of leadership when it comes to regulating battlefield behaviour in the profession of arms:

“Situational ethics are highly contextual and drift will occur without one transformational factor, and that’s leadership. Leadership is the action … that keeps that kind of behaviour within the bounds of what is lawful, what is ethical and what is moral.”

From 2017, Langford served as director of the Chief of Army’s select internal think tank, known as Strategic Initiatives Group.

By December 2018, Langford was a Brigadier in the role of Director-General of Future Land Warfare, Army Headquarters. In this role he established an office to explore robotic and autonomous systems, to give the army a "capability edge."

In February 2019, Brigadier Ian Langford gave a lecture titled ‘Accelerated Warfare' a military concept that would accelerate "the velocity of the engagements beyond the speed at which the enemy can target, and precisely execute and comprehend the events unfolding."

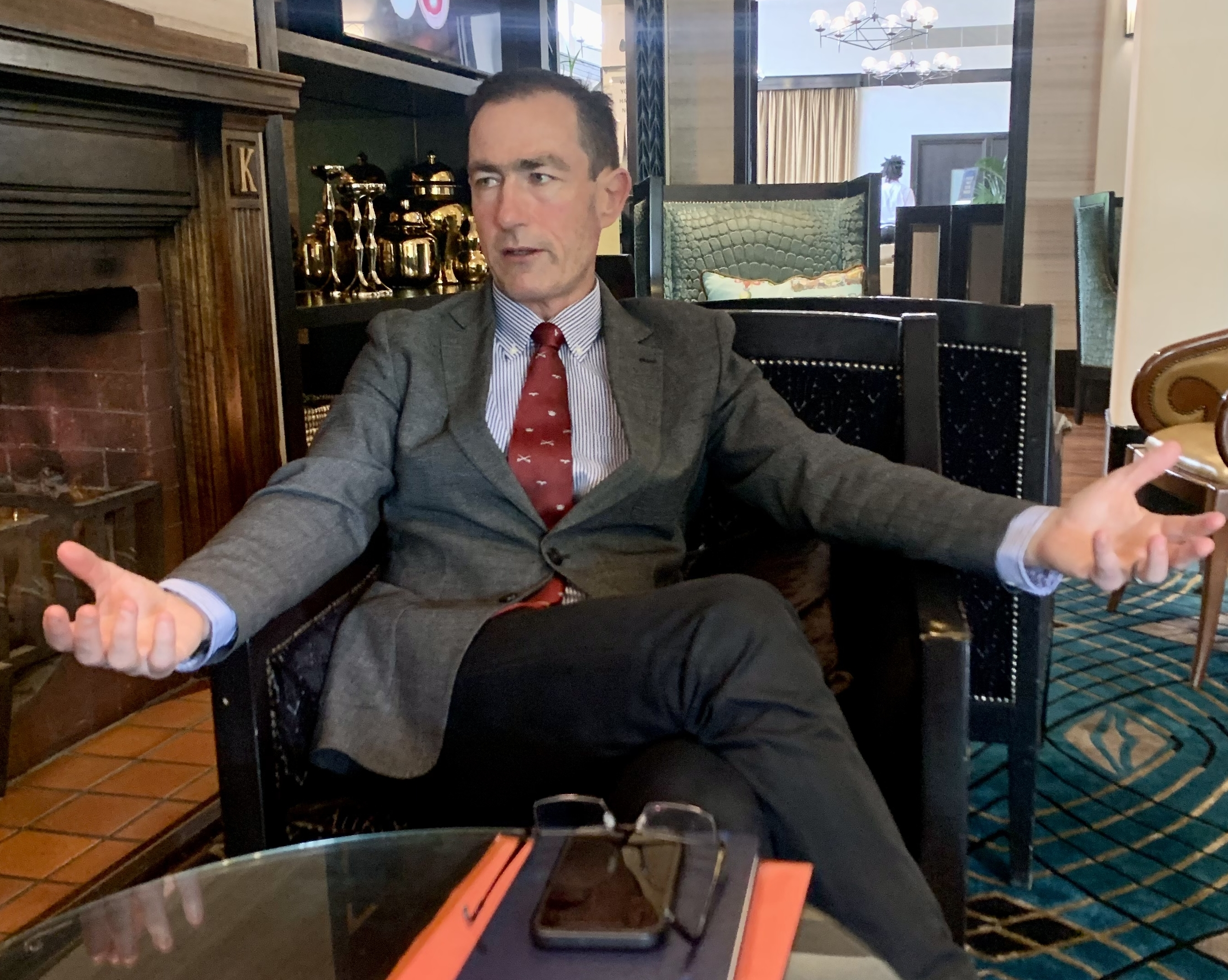
Ian Langford at a Defence Industry meeting at the Kurrajong Hotel, Canberra, Remembrance Day, 2022

By 2022, Langford was described as "one of the army's most respected and decorated leaders." However, by October of that year it was reported that he had "voluntarily discharged" after falling out of favour with the Chief of Defence. There was some conjecture this was connected to an alleged lack of oversight of soldiers when had command of special forces, however, the report in The Age indicated this was unfounded, reporting that Langford had "no involvement in or knowledge of any war crimes which may have taken place."

The resignation was described as "a massive loss" to the Australian Defence Force, since he had been a military leader in the mould of American Admiral William H. McRaven; "super smart, strategic and widely respected." Langford had served under McRaven during his time at NATO Special Operations Component Command-Afghanistan.

=== Industry and academic roles ===
On leaving the Australian Defence Force, Langford began consulting on national security and military strategy, regarded as an expert in this field. He was made a strategic adviser to UBH Group, who provide defence services in the information domain. In public discussions, Langford has challenged the defence community on Australia's lack of military preparedness, that it lacks armoured protection, and lags behind potential adversaries in acquiring unmanned capabilities.

Since 2023, he has served with UNSW Canberra—being made full professor in 2024—and an adjunct lecturer at Charles Sturt University. Also in 2024, Langford was made the Executive Director of Security and Defence PLuS, a program of the PLuS Alliance which is a joint higher education partnership of King's College London, Arizona State University and UNSW. In the role, it's understood he will lead Security and Defence PLuS operations, as a complement to the AUKUS security agreement.

== Bibliography ==
- Langford, Ian (Autumn 2010). "Australian special forces in Afghanistan : supporting Australia in the 'Long War'". Australian Army Journal. 7 (1): 21–32. Archived from the original on 14 June 2024.
- — (2014). Australian special operations : principles and considerations (PDF). Russell, ACT: Directorate of Future Land Warfare, Australian Army. Archived from the original (PDF) on 7 November 2022.
- — (2017). "Australia's offset and the A2/AD strategies". Parameters. 47 (1): 93–102. doi:10.55540/0031-1723.2839.

== Honours and awards ==
For his military service, Langford has received the following honours from the United Nations, NATO, and the Commonwealth of Australia.

	Distinguished Service Cross and Two Bars	Awarded in 2008, 2014, and 2016 for service in Afghanistan and Iraq.
Ribbon of the AASM	Australian Active Service Medal	With two clasps.
Ribbon of the Afghanistan Medal for Australia	Afghanistan Medal	Operation SLIPPER.
Ribbon of the Australian Service Medal	Australian Service Medal	With five clasps.
Ribbon of the Australian Operational Service Medal Greater Middle East Operation	Australian Operational Service Medal	Greater Middle East.
Ribbon of Defence Long Service Medal	Defence Long Service Medal	With two clasps.
Ribbon of the ADM	Australian Defence Medal	
United Nations Medal ribbon	United Nations Medal	With Multi Tour Indicator 2.
Ribbon of the United Nations Medal (UNAMET)	United Nations Medal	with UNAMET ribbon for active service in Timor-Leste (East Timor).
	NATO Medal for the Non-Article 5 ISAF Operation in Afghanistan	With clasp ISAF and Multi-tour Indicator 2.
	Infantry Combat Badge	
