= Les Schirato =

Leslie J. Schirato (born 1955), nicknamed “Australia’s Coffee King”, is an Australian entrepreneur and the chief executive officer of Vittoria Food & Beverage (Cantarella Bros), an Australian supplier and distributor of European food.

== Biography ==
Leslie J. Schirato was born in Sydney, Australia in 1955 to Italian immigrants. At the age of 16, he started working for the Cantarella Bros as a part-time employee over the school holidays, and began working full-time with the company in 1972.

In 1976, Schirato left the Cantarella Bros to work for David’s Holding, and later on, he secured a position with Fiat Australia as a sales manager. After a 5-year absence, he returned to the Cantarella Group in 1981. At this point, Schirato was working in a sales and marketing capacity, with the introduction of espresso coffee to the Australian supermarket being one of his first projects. Schirato stated that this was particularly challenging, as it was a time when coffee was viewed as an instant beverage, and luxury European coffee like espresso was not highly demanded by consumers. Schirato mentioned he was mocked when he tried to promote the company's Vittoria Coffee brand to supermarkets, and many of his peers in the coffee industry said that pure coffee would be too strong for Australians. Today, the pure coffee industry is worth over $487 million.

In 1993, Schirato was promoted to group managing director.

== Awards and Recognitions ==
- Ernst & Young National Entrepreneur of the Year 2001 (Retail, Consumer & Industrial Products)
