= List of law enforcement awards and honors =

This list of law enforcement awards and honors is an index to articles that describe notable awards related to law enforcement. The list is organized by region and country. Most of the awards are to law enforcement officers in the country granting the award.

== International ==
Country	Award	Sponsor	Description
International	IAWP Excellence in Performance	International Association of Women Police	Female officer who distinguishes herself by her exceptional policing skills that have a significant impact in her agency or area of responsibility

== Africa ==
Country	Award	Sponsor	Description
Africa	African Police Medal for Meritorious Service	United Kingdom	Non-European police officers in British African colonies
South Africa	South African Police decorations		(Various decorations and medals)
South Africa	South African prisons decorations		(Various decorations and medals)
Rhodesia	Police Decoration for Gallantry (Rhodesia)		For gallantry by members of the British South Africa Police, Police Support Unit and Police Reserve

== Americas ==
Country	Award	Sponsor	Description
Canada	Commissionaires Long Service Medal	Canadian Corps of Commissionaires	12 years of exemplary service by members of the Canadian Corps of Commissionaires
Canada	Corrections Exemplary Service Medal	Governor General of Canada	20 years service characterized by good conduct, industry and efficiency
Canada	Emergency Medical Services Exemplary Service Medal	Governor General of Canada	20 years service characterized by good conduct, industry and efficiency
Canada	Order of Merit of the Police Forces	Governor General of Canada	20 years service characterized by good conduct, industry and efficiency
Canada	Peace Officer Exemplary Service Medal	Governor General of Canada	20 years service characterized by good conduct, industry and efficiency
Canada	Police Exemplary Service Medal	Governor General of Canada	20 years service characterized by good conduct, industry and efficiency
Canada	Royal Canadian Mounted Police Long Service Medal	Governor General of Canada	Irreproachable character and has completed not less than 20 years of service with good conduct
United States	9/11 Heroes Medal of Valor	Federal government of the United States	442 public safety officers who were killed in the line of duty during the September 11, 2001 terrorist attacks at the World Trade Center and the empty wing of The Pentagon
United States	DEA Purple Heart Award	Drug Enforcement Administration	Individuals who had lost their lives or been seriously injured enforcing the drug laws of the United States.
United States	FBI Honorary Medals	Federal Bureau of Investigation	Exceptional acts by FBI employees and other law enforcement personnel working with the FBI.
United States	George Fencl Award	Philadelphia Daily News	Philadelphia Police Officer who exemplifies compassion, fairness, and civic commitment.
United States	Los Angeles Police Medal of Valor	Los Angeles Police Department	For bravery: highest law enforcement medal given by the L.A. Police Department.
United States	Public Safety Officer Medal of Valor	President of the United States	Highest decoration for bravery exhibited by public safety officers in the United States

== Asia ==
Country	Award	Sponsor	Description
India	Indian Police Medal	British Raj	Meritorious service and gallantry
India	Police Medal	India	Conspicuous gallantry or a meritorious record of at least 15 years in the Central Police/Security Organization
India	President's Police Medal	India	Gallantry in saving life and property, or in preventing crime or arresting criminals, or long and distinguished service
Singapore	Awards and decorations of the Immigration and Checkpoints Authority	Immigration & Checkpoints Authority	Various awards
Singapore	Awards and decorations of the Singapore Police Services	Singapore Police Services	Various awards
Sri Lanka	Ceylon Police Long Service Medal	Ceylon Police	18 years of unblemished service
Sri Lanka	Ceylon Police Medal	Ceylon Police	Gallantry or meritorious service
Sri Lanka	Desha Putra Padakkama	Sri Lanka Police	Sustaining serious injuries while facing terrorist attacks and on the line of duty
Sri Lanka	Janadhipathi Police Weeratha Padakkama	Sri Lanka Police	Gallantry or brave performance of duty
Sri Lanka	Sri Lanka Police First Aid Medal	Sri Lanka Police	Success in the first aid examination for ten consecutive years
Sri Lanka	Sri Lanka Police Vishishta Seva Padakkama	Sri Lanka Police	Distinguished Service
Sri Lanka	Sri Lanka Police Weeratha Padakkama	Sri Lanka Police	Gallantry or brave performance of duty
Sri Lanka	Sri Lanka Police Long Service Medal	Sri Lanka Police	18 years of unblemished service

== Europe ==
Country	Award	Sponsor	Description
Europe	AE-COPSD European Police Cross of Honor	European Association of Bodies and Public Organizations of Security and Defense	Serving or having served with honor, loyalty, integrity and courage during the course of their career
Europe	European Police Achievement Badge	European Police Sports Association	Proficiency in marksmanship, swimming, and running
France	Honour medal of the National Police	Minister of the Interior	Long service, conspicuous acts or outstanding service
France	Medal for internal security	Minister of the Interior	Service in operations under the authority of the Ministry of the Interior
France	Médaille de la Gendarmerie nationale	Minister of the Armed Forces	Gendarmerie nationale who distinguished themselves by a brilliant action which required special qualities of courage and self-sacrifice, accomplished on duty maintaining law and order
Jersey	Jersey Honorary Police Long Service and Good Conduct Medal	Honorary Police	12 years service
Spain	Order of Police Merit	Ministry of the Interior	Demonstration of the highest qualities of service to Spain, the police community, and humanity at large
United Kingdom	Colonial Police Long Service Medal	United Kingdom	18 years efficient service
United Kingdom	Colonial Special Constabulary Medal	United Kingdom	Long and meritorious service
United Kingdom	National Crime Agency Long Service and Good Conduct Medal	National Crime Agency	Twenty aggregate years of service
United Kingdom	Overseas Territories Police Medal		Gallantry or distinguished service by police officers in British Overseas Territories and formerly in Crown Colonies and British Dependent Territories
United Kingdom	Police Long Service and Good Conduct Medal		Twenty aggregate years of service in the police services of the United Kingdom
United Kingdom	Queen's Police Medal		Gallantry or distinguished service
United Kingdom	Royal Ulster Constabulary Service Medal		At least 18 months of service
United Kingdom	Special Constabulary Long Service Medal		9 years service

== Oceania ==
Country	Award	Sponsor	Description
Australia	Australian Police Medal	Australian honours system	Distinguished service
Australia	National Police Service Medal	Australian honours system	15 years 'ethical and diligent service' on or after 14 February 1975
Australia	New South Wales Police Force Commissioner's Sesquicentenary Citation	New South Wales Police Force	Employed with the NSW Police Force between March 1, 2012 to February 28, 2013
Australia	Police Diligent and Ethical Service Medal	New South Wales Police Force	10 years of service
Australia	Police Overseas Service Medal (Australia)	Australian honours system	Service with international peace-keeping organisations, or following a request from another government for assistance
Australia	South Australia Police Service Medal	South Australia Police	Ten years continuous, diligent and ethical service to the South Australia Police after 14 February 1975
Australia	Western Australia Police Commissioner's Medal for Excellence	Western Australia Police	Personnel who have consistently contributed to the achievement of the goals and objectives of the Western Australia Police
Australia	Western Australia Police Medal	Western Australia Police	10 years sustained diligent and ethical service to the Western Australia Police
Australia	Western Australia Police Star	Western Australia Police	Sworn personnel who are killed or seriously injured whilst carrying out their primary functions whether on or off duty
New Zealand	New Zealand Police Long Service and Good Conduct Medal	New Zealand Police	Full-time sworn officers and traffic officers of the New Zealand Police who have completed 14 years of service
New Zealand	New Zealand Police Meritorious Service Medal	New Zealand Police	Meritorious exceptional performance, commitment, or innovation
New Zealand	New Zealand Traffic Service Medal	New Zealand Meritorious & Long Service Awards	Fourteen years of continuous service

== See also ==
- Lists of awards
- List of awards for contributions to society
