= Police Medal =

Police Medal may refer to:

== Australia ==
- Australian Police Medal
- National Police Service Medal
- Police Overseas Service Medal (Australia)
- Police Diligent and Ethical Service Medal, New South Wales Police Force
- South Australia Police Service Medal
- Various medals of the Victoria Police#Honours and awards
- Western Australia Police Medal

== Bangladesh ==
- Bangladesh Police#Medals

== British colonies ==
- African Police Medal for Meritorious Service
- Colonial Police Medal
- Colonial Police Long Service Medal

== Canada ==
- Order of Merit of the Police Forces
- Royal Canadian Mounted Police Long Service Medal
- Police Exemplary Service Medal

== France ==
- Honour medal of the National Police

== India ==
- Medals of Indian Police and Civil Forces

== Myanmar ==
- Orders, decorations, and medals of Myanmar

== New Zealand ==
- New Zealand Police Meritorious Service Medal
- New Zealand Police Long Service and Good Conduct Medal

== Shanghai International Settlement ==
- Shanghai Municipal Police#Awards

== Sierra Leone ==
- Sierra Leone Police Medals, 1961–71. Versions for Gallantry, Meritorious Service and Long Service

== Singapore ==
- Pingat Keberanian Polis, also known as the Police Medal of Valour and the Police Gallantry Medal

== South Africa ==
- South African Police decorations

== Sri Lanka (formerly Ceylon) ==
- Ceylon Police Medal
- Awards and decorations of the Sri Lanka Police

== United Kingdom and the Commonwealth ==
- Queen's Police Medal
- Police Long Service and Good Conduct Medal
- Overseas Territories Police Medal

== United States ==
- United States law enforcement decorations

== See also ==
- Queen's Gallantry Medal
