= New South Wales Honours =

The State of New South Wales has created several independent honours to that of the Australian Honours System.

== Non-Service specific state awards ==
=== Citations ===
Unit citations are awarded to the organisation, and may be worn by members who served in the organisation at the time and meeting the requirements.

- 2019–20 NSW Premier's Bushfire Emergency Citation – Performed duty on at least one shift at any time during the 2019–20 Australian bushfire season within NSW.

== New South Wales Ambulance ==
NSW Ambulance has designated several honours.

=== Medals and awards ===
- Commissioner's Valour Medal – An employee who demonstrates distinguished command and leadership through displayed acts of bravery in circumstances of extreme peril.
- Commissioner's Conspicuous Service Medal – Employees who demonstrate commendable achievement or commitment to duty through displayed acts of bravery in perilous circumstances.
- Commissioner's Meritorious Service Medal – Awarded to employees for service that may be considered meritorious if it demonstrates a high degree of resource and devotion, or in the exemplary discharge of special duties above and beyond an employee’s normal work.
- Long Service and Good Conduct Medal – Permanent employees of NSW Ambulance who have provided 10 years of continuous or aggregate service with NSW Ambulance. The employee’s service must have been regarded as ‘good conduct’ and not brought discredit to NSW Ambulance.
- Volunteers long Service and Good Conduct Medal – Volunteer members of NSW Ambulance who have performed 10 years of continuous (or aggregate) service. The volunteer’s service must have been regarded as ‘good conduct’ and not brought discredit to NSW Ambulance.
- Chaplaincy Long Service and Good Conduct Medal – Chaplains who have performed five years of continuous (or aggregate) service with NSW Ambulance. The chaplain’s service must have been regarded as 'good conduct' and not brought discredit to NSW Ambulance.
- NSW Ambulance Band Long Service and Good Conduct Award – Members of the NSW Ambulance Band who have performed 10 years of continuous (or aggregate) service with NSW Ambulance. The band member’s service must have been regarded as 'good conduct' and not brought discredit to NSW Ambulance.

=== Commendations ===
- Commissioner’s Commendation for Courage – An employee who performs acts of bravery in hazardous circumstances.
- Commissioner’s Commendation for Service – Employees who demonstrate outstanding dedication to duty and provide exceptional service to NSW Ambulance.
- Commendation for Courage (Community) – Awarded to a community member for acts of bravery in hazardous circumstances.

=== Citations ===
- Commissioner’s Unit Citation for Courage – Awarded to a group who, under hazardous circumstances, collectively display courage of a high order beyond that of expectation, while consciously placing themselves at substantial risk of injury.
- Commissioner’s Unit Citation for Service – A group who collectively demonstrate outstanding dedication to duty and provide conspicuous service to NSW Ambulance.
- Citation for Courage (Community) – Awarded to an individual community member or group, who under hazardous circumstances, individually or collectively displayed courage of a high order beyond that of expectation, while consciously placing themselves at substantial risk of injury

== New South Wales Police Force ==
The NSW Police Force has several internal honours. These honours involve being internally nominated by an officer of a higher rank with the process taking several years before the recognition is received.

=== Medals and awards ===
- New South Wales Police Commissioner's Valour Award – Awarded to an officer who performs an act of exceptional bravery in a life threatening situation with a clear significant risk to life (established 1987).
- New South Wales Police Medal (Diligent and Ethical Service) – Awarded to an officer for 10 years service diligent and ethical service, a clasp is awarded for another 5-year (equating to 15 years service). The clasp is replaced every 5 years there after to read the total number of years service represented by the medal.

=== Commendations ===
- New South Wales Police Commissioner's Commendation for Courage – Awarded to a member of NSW Police where the risk to life has been less apparent than criteria for Valour Award but where sufficient courage has been shown under hazardous circumstances to warrant the Award.
- New South Wales Police Commissioner's Commendation for Service – Awarded to a member of NSW Police in recognition of outstanding service.
- New South Wales Police Commissioner's Commendation Olympic – Awarded to a member of NSW Police in recognition of meritorious performance of service during the Sydney 2000 Olympic Games period.
- New South Wales Police Commissioner's Commendation Community – Awarded to a member of NSW Police in their own time and as representatives of the NSW Police Force consistently raise significant funds for a community cause, a not-for-profit organisation or charity over five years or greater.

=== Citations ===
- New South Wales Police Commissioner's Unit Citation – Awarded to members of NSW Police who collectively come together for a common purpose and perform outstanding service which may involve bravery or other actions of obvious merit (Extremely rare to be awarded to frontline General Duties officers irrespective of actions performed).
- New South Wales Police Commissioner's Community Service Citation – Awarded to members of NSW Police who, in their own time and as representatives of the NSW Police Force volunteered in a police related field or other not-for-profit organisation, for five or more years to the community or raise over $50000 for charities.
- New South Wales Police Commissioner's Citation Olympic – Awarded to members of NSW Police who were employed between the 15 September 2000 and the 1 November 2000 Olympic period.
- New South Wales Police Sesquicentenary 150th Citation – Serving during the 150th year of the New South Wales Police Force (2012).

== New South Wales Rural Fire Service ==
The NSW Rural Fire Service (RFS) has designed several honours.

=== Medals and awards ===
- Commissioner's Award for Valour – Awarded to recognise an act of conspicuous courage involving exceptional bravery under circumstances of great peril where there has been a clear and significant risk to life.
- New South Wales Rural Fire Service Long Service Medal – Awarded for 10 years of long service with impellers and clasps awarded for each subsequent 10 year period of service.

=== Commendations ===
- Commissioner’s Commendation for Bravery – Awarded to recognise an act of courage under hazardous circumstances where the risk to life has not been as significant as to warrant the Commissioner’s Award for Valour but is worthy of recognition.
- Commissioner’s Commendation for Service – Awarded to recognise service of a meritorious nature, or outstanding actions in relation to fire service duties, administrative leadership, or exemplary performance of a specific difficult project or task, not involving bravery.

=== Citations ===
- Commissioner’s Unit Citation for Bravery – Awarded to crews, brigades, groups, or organised units, where outstanding service involving group bravery warrants recognition.
- Commissioner’s Unit Citation for Service – Awarded to crews, brigades, groups, or organised units to recognise outstanding service of a meritorious nature, such as group action in relation to fire service duties, group work performance, or other outstanding or meritorious service not involving bravery.

== New South Wales State Emergency Service ==
The New South Wales State Emergency Service (SES) has designated several honours.

=== Medals and awards ===
- New South Wales State Emergency Service Long Service Medal – Awarded to members of the NSW SES who have achieved a period of diligent service of five years, and then every five years' service anniversary thereafter.

=== Commendations ===
- Commissioner's Commendation for Courage – A volunteer who performs acts of bravery in hazardous circumstances.
- Commissioner's Commendation for Service – Awarded for exemplary service to the NSW SES. This includes, but is not restricted to, special project work, an initiative or innovation that improves the NSW SES.

=== Citations ===
- Commissioner’s Unit Citation – Awarded to, groups, or organised units, where outstanding service involving outstanding service.

== Corrective Services New South Wales ==
=== Medals and awards ===
- New South Wales Corrective Service Long Service Medal – Awarded for 15 years service in the New South Wales Prison Service.

== Fire and Rescue New South Wales ==
Fire and Rescue NSW has designed several honours.

=== Medals and awards ===
- Fire and Rescue NSW Medal for Conspicuous Bravery – Awarded to any firefighter who, while performing firefighting or emergency operations, whether on or off duty, exhibits exceptional bravery.
- Fire and Rescue NSW Long Service and Good Conduct Medal – Awarded for diligent long service and good conduct by members of Fire and Rescue NSW with 10 years of eligible service.

=== Commendations ===
- Fire and Rescue NSW Commendation for Courageous Action – Awarded on an individual for an act of courage that is worthy of special recognition.
- Fire and Rescue NSW Commendation for Meritorious Service – Awarded on an individual to acknowledge meritorious service or action that is worthy of special recognition

=== Citations ===
- Fire and Rescue NSW Unit Commendation for Courageous Action – Awarded to a group combined and acting as a unit who have distinguished themselves in exceptionally difficult and dangerous situations.
- Fire and Rescue NSW Unit Commendation for Meritorious Service – Awarded to a group combined and acting as a unit who have provided service of particular note, or have distinguished themselves in a manner which is worthy of recognition.

== See also ==
- Queensland Honours
