= Matthew Butcher =

Australian police officer

- Born: 1975/1976 (aged 50–51)
- Occupation: Police constable
- Employer: Western Australia Police
- Spouse: Katrina Butcher
- Awards: Pride of Australia; Western Australia Police Star; Commissioner's Medal for Excellence; Western Australia Police Medal

Matthew Butcher (born 1975/1976) is a Western Australia Police (WAPOL) constable, who received significant media attention following an assault which left him brain damaged, partially paralysed and visually impaired. In 2009, Constable Butcher was awarded the Emergency Services "Pride of Australia" medal. He has also been awarded the Western Australia Police Star, Commissioner's Medal for Excellence and Western Australia Police Medal.

== Old Bailey incident ==
On the evening of 4 February 2008 Matthew Butcher and several other police officers intervened in a fight at the Old Bailey tavern in Joondalup, Perth, opposite the Joondalup police station. One of the men involved, Robert McLeod (55) was shot by Constable Butcher with a Taser stun gun. Robert McLeod's son Barry (28), launched a flying headbutt at Constable Butcher as soon as his weapon was deployed resulting in Constable Butcher being knocked unconscious and falling to the ground, resulting in a broken cheekbone, broken jaw, and bleeding on the brain. The entire incident was captured on a mobile phone video camera from an onlooker.

Constable Butcher was taken to Sir Charles Gairdner Hospital for his injuries, where he was placed into an induced coma. Surgery was performed to remove swelling on his brain, however he sustained permanent brain injuries causing impaired motor control and vision. Constable Butcher was discharged from Royal Perth Rehabilitation Hospital in September 2008, however, he remains paralysed from the left side and has not been able to use his left arm since the incident.

=== Court case ===
Shortly after the incident, Robert McLeod and his two sons Barry and Scott were charged with intent to cause grievous bodily harm, assaulting a public officer, obstructing an officer and making threats to kill. In March 2009, a District Court jury found the accused not guilty of all charges relating to the assault on Constable Butcher. McLeod's lawyers argued the accused acted in self defence when confronted by police, who they said acted with excessive force as they attempted to arrest them.

==== Aftermath ====
The verdict resulted in an outcry from the WAPOL as well as the public. Several days after the verdict was handed down, 2000 people took part in a public rally on the steps of Parliament House in Perth, calling for tougher penalties for anyone who assaults a police officer. At this rally, Butcher's wife Katrina gave an address thanking the public for their support. In September 2009, the Upper House of the West Australian parliament passed new mandatory sentencing laws, which will result in a jail sentence for anyone found guilty of assaulting a public officer, including police.

=== Compensation ===
In January 2011, Matthew Butcher was compensated A$3.3 million from the West Australia government for continuing medical treatment, loss of earnings and trauma sustained by the incident. Robert Macleod filed a lawsuit against Butcher, claiming damages for "wrongful battery" relating to the police use of a Taser on him during his arrest. This action was withdrawn in 2015.
