= Desha Puthra Padakkama =

- Type: Medal
- Awarded for: Long Service
- Presented by: Sri Lanka
- Eligibility: Members of the Sri Lanka Police
- Status: Wound medal
- Established: 1982
- Ribbon bar

Precedence
- Next (higher): Deergha Sewa Padakkama
- Next (lower): Janaraja Padakkama
- Related: Desha Puthra Sammanaya

The Desha Puthra Padakkama (දේශ පුත්‍ර සමිමානය, dēśa putra padakkama, "Son of the Country Medal") is awarded to police officers in Sri Lanka for sustaining serious injuries while facing terrorist attacks and on the line of duty. The medal is based on the Desha Puthra Sammanaya issued by the Sri Lankan armed forces, however with a different ribbon.

== See also ==
- Awards and decorations of the Sri Lanka Police
- Desha Puthra Sammanaya
