= Awards and decorations of the Singapore Police Services =

Orders of the Ministry of Home Affairs Singapore

Orders and decorations conferred to officers from the Ministry of Home Affairs Singapore which are from several agencies such as Singapore Police Force, Singapore Prison Service, and Central Narcotics Bureau.

== Medals ==
=== Colonial Era ===
- King's Police Medal
- Colonial Police Medal for Meritorious Service
- Colonial Police Medal for Gallantry
- Colonial Police Long Service Medal

=== After World War II ===
- Pingat Pertahanan (The Defence Medal)
- Pingat Perkhidmatan Anggota Beruniform Malaysia (Uniformed Services Malaysia Medal)
- General Service Medal (Malaya)
- Police Long Service Medal
- Good Service Medal
- Johan Mangku Negara (Companion of the Order of the Defender of the Realm) - JMN
- Kesatria Mangku Negara (Officer of the Order of the Defender of the Realm) - KMN
- Ahli Mangku Negara (Member of the Order of the Defender of the Realm) - AMN
- Pingat Pangkuan Negara (Medal of the Order of the Defender of the Realm) - PPN

=== Present ===
- Pingat Polis Perkasa (Police Gallantry Medal)
- Pingat Gagah Perkasa (Conspicuous Gallantry Medal)
- Pingat Polis Keberanian (Police Medal of Valour)
- Pingat Bakti Setia (Polis) (Long Service Award (Police))
- Singapore Police Service Long Service and Good Conduct Medal (35 Years)
- Singapore Police Service Long Service and Good Conduct Medal (30 Years)
- Singapore Police Service Long Service and Good Conduct Medal(10 Years)
- Singapore Police Service Good Service Medal
- Pingat Seberang Laut Perhidmatan Polis Singapura (Singapore Police Service Overseas Service Medal)
- Pingat Perkhidmatan Operasi Home Team (Home Team Operational Service Medal) (2014)
- Singapore Police Bicentennial 2020 Medal
- COVID-19 Resilience Medal

== Certificates ==
- Commissioner Of Police Commendation
- Commissioner Of Police Testimonial
- Certificate Of Commendation, Police National Service Department

== Badges ==
=== Skills Badges ===
- SOC Badge
- K9 Badge
- STAR Badge
- Sniper Badge (Sleeve) (Basic, Senior, Master)
- Parachute Badge (Basic, Senior, Master)
- Parachute Badge Thai Airborne
- STAR Diver Badge
- Diver Badge (Basic, Senior, Master )
- Combat Skills Badge (MP5) Badge
- Gurka (GC) (Sleeve)
- Police Coast Guard (Coxswain (Gold), Crew - Steersman (Silver), Deckhand (Bronze))
- Security Command (Seccom) Badge
- Field Instructor (FI) Badge, 3 Grades (Silver, Gold, Red) (Junior - Senior FI Ranks) (Sleeve)
- Police Drone Control, UAV Badge
- ERT Badge
- Procom Badge (IRT Badge)
- Trainer Badge(HTA), 4 Grades (Trainer, Specialist Trainer(Bronze), Principal Trainer(Silver), Master Trainer(Gold))
- FRT Badge
- RED Teaming Badge
- Special Operations Expert Track Badge(Bronze/Silver/Gold)
- Investigation & Intelligence Expert Track Badge (Bronze/Silver/Gold)

=== Identification Badge ===
- Aide-de-Camp Badge
- SPF200 Badge
- Guard Of Honour Badge
- Crisis Negotiator Badge
- SPF Overseas Deployment Badge
- Airport Badge
