= Good service =

Good service may refer to:

- Permanent Force Good Service Medal
- Singapore Armed Forces Good Service Medal
- Singapore Police Force Good Service Medal
