= POSM =

POSM may refer to:

- Patient Operated Selector Mechanism, a communications device for people with disabilities
- Point-of-sale materials, advertising materials in retail shops attracting customers to specific products; see Point of sale display
- Police Overseas Service Medal, an award in the Australian honours system.
- Propylene Oxide / Styrene Monomer, a chemical process of manufacturing propylene and styrene; see Styrene#From ethylbenzene
