= NSW Premier's Flood Emergency Citation =

New South Wales award recognising service during the 2021–2023 floods

- Awarded for: Operational service during the major New South Wales flood emergencies of 2021–2023
- Sponsored by: Premier of New South Wales
- Country: Australia
- Presented by: Government of New South Wales
- Eligibility: Emergency service personnel, defence personnel, members of eligible organisations and qualifying unaffiliated volunteers
- Post-nominals: None
- Status: Active
- Established: 28 March 2025
- First award: 2026

The NSW Premier's Flood Emergency Citation is a state-level citation established by the Government of New South Wales to recognise people who made significant contributions to the operational response to major floods in New South Wales between November 2021 and March 2023.

The citation recognises volunteers and paid personnel who took part in front-line operations, incident management or operational support. Eligible recipients include members of emergency service organisations, interstate and international emergency agencies, the Australian Defence Force, approved community organisations and qualifying unaffiliated volunteers, including members of informal groups commonly described as the “Tinny Army”.

The award is administered by the New South Wales State Emergency Service in consultation with the NSW Premier's Department.

== History ==
The citation was announced by the New South Wales Government on 28 March 2025 to recognise the response to the prolonged and widespread flooding that affected the state between 2021 and 2023.

The floods comprised several major emergency campaigns across northern, southern, western and metropolitan New South Wales. The citation was intended to recognise people involved in the immediate operational response, including rescues, evacuations, protection of property and support for evacuation centres.

The establishment of the citation was reported in regional media as recognition of emergency responders, defence personnel, community organisations and spontaneous volunteers who assisted during the floods.

== Recognised flood events ==
For the purposes of the citation, the New South Wales Government identified four periods of flooding:

- Southern and Western New South Wales floods, from 9 November 2021 to 21 February 2022;
- Northern New South Wales and Hawkesbury–Nepean Valley floods, from 22 February to 8 April 2022;
- Greater Sydney and Hunter Valley floods, from 27 June to 17 July 2022; and
- Southern and Western New South Wales floods, from 2 August 2022 to 8 March 2023.

== Eligibility ==
A recipient associated with an eligible organisation must have been called upon by the lead combat agency to undertake duties as part of the operational response to the floods and must have performed those duties during one or more of the recognised event periods.

Operational response duties include activities undertaken as part of combating the emergency or providing immediate relief to people affected by it. Qualifying work may be performed on a paid or voluntary basis and must involve one or more of the following:

- front-line operational response;
- incident management; or
- incident support.

The guidelines do not impose a minimum number of duties or consecutive days of service.

Examples of qualifying emergency-response activities include rescuing people or animals trapped by floodwater, filling and distributing sandbags, assisting with evacuations and supporting evacuation centres. Work limited to cleaning properties after floodwaters had receded is not considered an emergency-response activity for the purposes of the citation.

=== Eligible organisations ===
Eligible organisations may include:

- emergency service organisations recognised under the State Emergency and Rescue Management Act 1989;
- emergency services or other agencies from another Australian state or territory;
- the Australian Defence Force when deployed under a Defence Assistance to the Civil Community request;
- emergency services or agencies from an international jurisdiction deployed at the request of the lead combat agency; and
- other organisations nominated by the Commissioner of the NSW State Emergency Service and approved by the Premier.

The NSW State Emergency Service was the lead combat agency for the flood response.

=== Unaffiliated volunteers ===
Individuals who assisted without being registered with an eligible organisation may nominate themselves. Such applicants must provide details of the dates and locations at which they assisted and a description of the work undertaken.

The Commissioner of the NSW State Emergency Service is authorised to determine the eligibility of unaffiliated individuals who went beyond their normally expected role or provided exceptional support to the operational response.

== Insignia and accompanying documents ==
The insignia is a rectangular, silver-framed, navy-blue lapel bar measuring 32 mm (1.3 in) wide and 13 mm (0.51 in) high. It features a blue stripe representing the flood emergency and an image of the waratah, the floral emblem of New South Wales.

Recipients also receive:

- an individualised letter signed by the Premier of New South Wales, the Minister for Emergency Services and the Commissioner of the NSW State Emergency Service; and
- an individualised commemorative certificate bearing the same signatures and identifying the organisation or organisations through which the recipient contributed to the emergency response.

The letter and certificate are packaged together in an A4 presentation folder with a protective backing board.

== Nomination and administration ==
The NSW State Emergency Service administers the citation in consultation with the Premier's Department.

For members of eligible organisations, the State Emergency Service invites the relevant organisation to submit nominations. Each organisation is responsible for establishing an internal process to identify eligible personnel, and nominations must be endorsed by the organisation's head before submission.

People who served through an eligible organisation are generally nominated by that organisation rather than through the individual application process. Unaffiliated volunteers may submit an individual nomination for assessment by the Flood Citation Team.

Applications from unaffiliated volunteers are reviewed to confirm the applicant's participation and eligibility and must ultimately be endorsed by the Commissioner of the NSW State Emergency Service.

The anticipated period for validating, processing and distributing a nomination is approximately six months.

== Distribution ==
Citation packages are distributed by the NSW State Emergency Service to eligible organisations, which may present them at formal ceremonies or informal gatherings. Packages for unaffiliated recipients may be distributed directly to the individual.

Organisations with large numbers of recipients are required to nominate a delivery location with sufficient capacity to receive the citation packages.

== Wearing and protocols ==
The citation bar may be worn in the same manner as an internal service award of the recipient's organisation, subject to the organisation's uniform and wearing protocols.

The citation does not confer post-nominal letters. A person may receive the citation only once, even where the person served through several eligible organisations. In those circumstances, the State Emergency Service may consolidate the recipient's organisations on a single certificate.

Receipt of another award for service during the floods does not prevent a person from receiving the citation.

== See also ==
- 2021 eastern Australia floods
- 2022 eastern Australia floods
- 2022 New South Wales floods
- New South Wales Rural Fire Service
- Australian honours and awards system
- NSW Premier's Bushfire Emergency Citation
