= Matt Butcher =

Matt Butcher may refer to:

- Matt Butcher (musician)
- Matt Butcher (footballer)

== See also ==
- Matthew Butcher, Western Australia Police constable
