= Sri Lanka Police 125th Anniversary Medal =

- Type: Commemorative Medal
- Presented by: Sri Lanka
- Eligibility: Members of the Sri Lanka Police
- Established: 1991
- Ribbon bar

Precedence
- Next (higher): Riviresa Campaign Services Medal
- Next (lower): Sri Lanka Police First Aid Medal

The Sri Lanka Police 125th Anniversary Medal was awarded to police officers in Sri Lanka who were in service on 3 September 1991, when the Sri Lanka Police celebrated its 125th anniversary.

== See also ==
- Awards and decorations of the Sri Lanka Police
- Sri Lanka Army Volunteer Force Centenary Medal
