= Awards and decorations of the Sri Lanka Police =

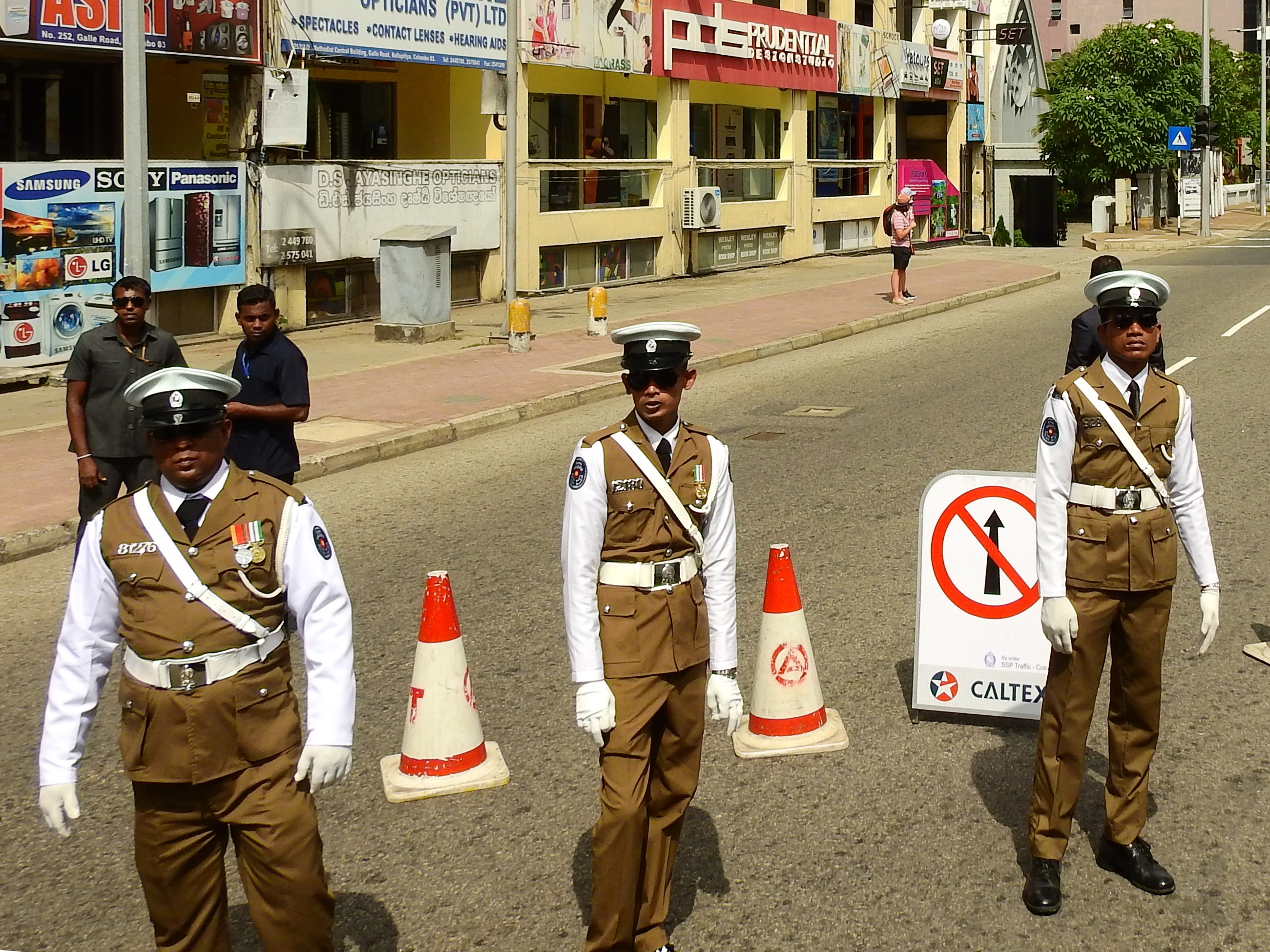
Traffic police officers in dress uniform, medals on display.

The current decorations and medals of the Sri Lanka Police were adapted from those of the Dominion of Ceylon in 1972 when Sri Lanka became a republic.

== Gallantry medals ==
- Janadhipathi Police Weeratha Padakkama (Presidential Medal of Police Gallantry)
- Sri Lanka Police Weeratha Padakkama (Sri Lanka Police Gallantry Medal)

== Service medals ==
- Sri Lanka Police Vishishta Seva Padakkama (Sri Lanka Police Distinguished Service Medal)
- Sri Lanka Police Long Service Medal
- Sri Lanka Police First Aid Medal

== Meritorious awards & medals ==
- Uththama Pooja Pranama Padakkama (Recognition of Meritorious Sacrifice Medal)
- Desha Puthra Padakkama (Son of the Nation Medal)

== Campaign medals ==
- Purna Bhumi Padakkama
- Riviresa Campaign Services Medal
- Northern Humanitarian Operations Medal
- Eastern Humanitarian Operations Medal

== Coronation / Inauguration medals ==
- Ceylon Police Independence Medal - 1948
- Queen Elizabeth II Coronation Medal - 1953
- President's Inauguration Medal - 1978

== Anniversary medals ==
- Janaraja Padakkama (The Republic Medal) - 1972
- 50th Independence Anniversary Commemoration Medal - 1998
- Sri Lanka Police 125th Anniversary Medal (125th Anniversary Medal)

== United Nations' service medals ==
The United Nations Medal for participation in:

- United Nations Mission of Support to East Timor, in 2003
- United Nations Mission in Liberia, in 2007.

== Former decorations & medals ==
- Queen's Police Medal (1954-1977)
- King's Police Medal (1909-1954)
- Ceylon Police Medal (1950-1972)
- Colonial Police Medal (1938-1950)
- Ceylon Police Long Service Medal (1950-1972)
- Colonial Police Long Service Medal (1934-1950)
- Defence Medal (1939-1945)

== Order of precedence ==
Ribbon	Award	Established
	Janadhipathi Police Weeratha Padakkama	1972
	Sri Lanka Police Weeratha Padakkama	1972
	Sri Lanka Police Vishishta Seva Padakkama	1972
	Sri Lanka Police Long Service Medal	1972
	Desha Puthra Padakkama	1972
	Sewabhimani Padakkama	2019
	Sewa Padakkama	2019
	Janaraja Padakkama	
	President's Inauguration Medal	1978
	50th Independence Anniversary Commemoration Medal	1998
	Purna Bhumi Padakkama	1977
	Riviresa Campaign Services Medal	1996
	Sri Lanka Police 125th Anniversary Medal	1991
	Sri Lanka Police First Aid Medal	
	United Nations Medals	Various
	Northern Humanitarian Operations Medal	2010
	Eastern Humanitarian Operations Medal	2010

== See also ==
- Military awards and decorations of Sri Lanka
