= Ceylon Police Long Service Medal =

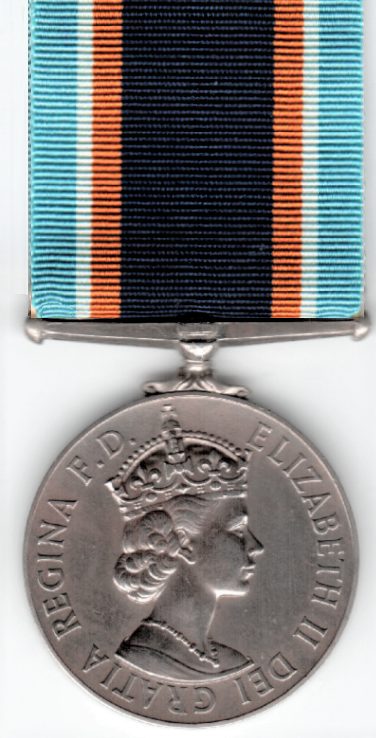
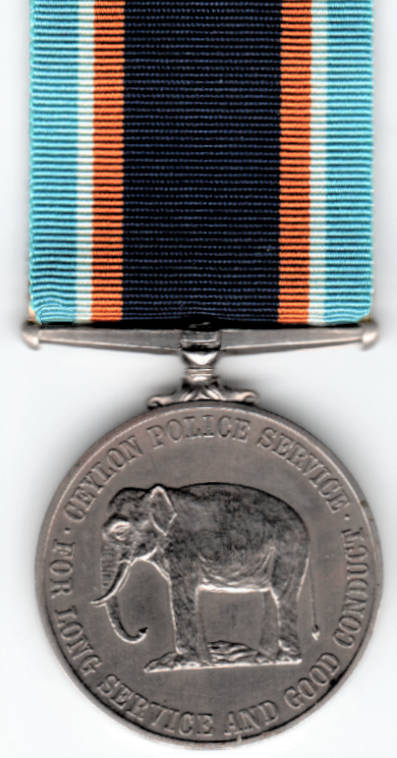
- Obverse (from 1953) and reverse of medal
- Type: Medal
- Awarded for: Long Service
- Presented by: Ceylon
- Eligibility: Members of the Ceylon Police
- Status: Defunct
- Established: 1950
- Final award: 1972
- Ribbon bar of the medal

Precedence
- Next (higher): Royal Canadian Mounted Police Long Service Medal
- Next (lower): Ceylon Fire Services Long Service Medal
- Related: Police Long Service and Good Conduct Medal

The Ceylon Police Long Service Medal was awarded to police officers in Ceylon of and below the rank of Chief Inspector for completing 18 years of unblemished service. Bars for 25 and 30 years service were also awarded.

The medal was established in August 1950 to replace the Colonial Police Long Service Medal. It was itself replaced by the Deergha Sewa Padakkama when Ceylon became a Republic in 1972.

Circular and made of cupronickel, the medal has the sovereign's effigy of the obverse, (George VI until 1953, then Elizabeth II). The reverse bears the image of an elephant, surrounded by the description, "Ceylon Police Service. For Long Service and Good Conduct." It has a straight bar suspension for the ribbon.

A silver medal of similar design had been instituted in 1925 to reward 15 years active service with the Ceylon Police. The ribbon, suspended from a ring, had a red central stripe, with narrower yellow, black, yellow stripes on each side. This medal was superseded by the Colonial Police Long Service Medal on its introduction in 1934.

The Ceylon Fire Services Long Service Medal was introduced at the same time as the police medal. Of a similar design and award criteria, the reverse included the inscription "Ceylon Fire Services", while the ribbon added a central narrow white stripe.

== See also ==
- Awards and decorations of the Sri Lanka Police
- Deergha Sewa Padakkama
- Ceylon Police Medal
