= Humanitarian Overseas Service Medal =

- Obverse of medal and ribbon
- Type: Medal
- Awarded for: Humanitarian service overseas
- Presented by: Australia
- Eligibility: members of declared eligible organisations, police and military
- Clasps: 25
- Status: Currently awarded
- Established: 16 April 1999

Highlights
- Total: 4,722

Order of Wear
- Next (higher): Police Overseas Service Medal
- Next (lower): National Emergency Medal
- Related: Australian Service Medal

The Humanitarian Overseas Service Medal is an award in the Australian honours system. The award is presented to those who perform humanitarian service in a foreign country, in particular those working in dangerous environments or conditions or during a humanitarian crisis. The award was introduced by letters patent on 16 April 1999, following a review of the Australian honours and awards system beginning in 1995.

Potential recipients have to prove they worked for a minimum of 30 days in the location depicted by the clasp, during a period of time set in the award criteria. In addition, potential recipients have to be working for an aid organisation recognised by the criteria or with a United Nations taskforce during that timeframe. In 2005, special criteria were established for people working during the 2004 Indian Ocean earthquake or the 2005 Nias–Simeulue earthquake, with a maximum time period of 7 or 14 days depending on the time frame.

The medal was originally intended as a civilian award, in parallel with the Australian Service Medal and the Police Overseas Service Medal, and until 2005 the Australian Defence Force had never been declared an eligible organisation. This is because, in most cases, the Australian Service Medal is already available to military personnel serving alongside humanitarian relief operations. However, defence personnel on leave of absence and serving an eligible organisation could qualify for the medal. The declaration of eligible organisations for the Indian Ocean clasp was the first time the Australian Defence Force was declared an eligible organisation, as Operation Sumatra Assist was purely a disaster relief operation and did not attract any military operational service award. The Australian Defence Force was again declared an eligible organisation for the participation of its personnel in Operation Pakistan Assist, part of the Australian humanitarian response to 8 October 2005 Pakistan earthquake.

However, the medal has not been awarded to Defence personnel assigned to Operation Tsunami Assist who both lived through both Tsunami's and were forced assisgned in Penang Malaysia. Elements include 324 Combat Support Squadron (and operational augmentees) and Rifle Company Butterworth. All attempts by ADF members to be recognised for their service in Operation Tsunami Assist whilst serving in Malaysia (including those injured or who lost family during both Tsunami's) have been rejected by Prime Minister and Cabinet for the HOSM and by the Department of Defence for the Australian Service Medal.

== Description ==
- The Humanitarian Overseas Service Medal is a circular medal. The obverse features a stylised eucalyptus tree in the centre, with its branches reaching to the edge of the medal. A pattern of gumnuts rings the eucalyptus.
- The reverse has the same pattern of gumnuts around the rim, with the name of the recipient engraved.
- The ribbon is eucalyptus green, divided vertically by a gold stripe. These colours are associative with the green and gold, the national colours of Australia, while continuing with the eucalyptus theming; symbolising hope and regeneration after the disaster.

== Clasps ==
Nineteen clasps have been declared for the Humanitarian Overseas Service Medal as of May 2010, to indicate what region(s) the recipient worked in. These are detailed below:

- Afghanistan

30 days service with civilian organisations in Afghanistan from 8 December 1979 to present

- Balkans

30 days civilian service in the period;
- Zone 1 – Bosnia and Herzegovina, Croatia, Montenegro and Serbia – from 21 February 1992 to present
- Zone 2 – Serbia, Kosovo, Albania, Republic of Macedonia – from 24 March 1999 to present

- British Columbia

14 days service in Canada with civilian organisations from 3 August 2009 to 6 September 2009. Following wildfires in British Columbia, Canada

- British Columbia II

14 days service in Canada with civilian organisations from August 2017 to September 2017. Following wildfires in British Columbia, Canada

- Cambodia

30 days service in Cambodia with civilian organisations from 1 July 1979 to 31 December 1993

- Christchurch

14 days service with civilian rescue agencies or State and Territory police agencies from 22 February 2011 to 26 May 2011 following the 2011 Christchurch earthquake in New Zealand

- East Timor

30 days service with civilian organisations in East Timor from 1 June 1999 to 19 May 2002

- Great Lakes

30 days service with civilian organisations in the African Great Lakes area from 1 May 1994 to Present

- Haiti

14 days service with civilian organisations in Haiti from 12 January 2010 to 15 March 2010. Following a Hurricane

- Indian Ocean

Civilian, Police and Military service providing assistance following the 2004 Indian Ocean earthquake
- 7 days service in the period 26 December 2004 – 8 January 2005
- 14 days service in the period 26 December 2004 – 12 February 2005
Civilian and Military service providing assistance following the 2005 Nias–Simeulue earthquake
- 7 days service in the period 28 March 2005 – 18 April 2005

- Iraq

30 days service with civilian organisations in Iraq from 20 March 2003 to Present

- Japan

14 days service with civilian and rescue agencies from 11 March 2011 to 27 May 2011 following the 2011 Tōhoku earthquake and tsunami

- Mozambique

30 days service with civilian organisations in Mozambique from 10 October 1985 to 31 January 1995

- Nepal

10 days service with civilian organisations from 25 April 2015 to 22 June 2015.

- Northern Iraq

30 days service with civilian organisations in Northern Iraq from 1 February 1991 to 31 May 1995

- Pakistan

Civilian and Military assistance following the 2005 Pakistan earthquake
- 14 days service in the period 8 October 2005 – 8 November 2005
- 30 days service in the period 8 October 2005 – 31 May 2006

- Pakistan II

14 days service with civilian and military agencies from 6 August 2010 to 8 November 2010 following the 2010 Pakistan flood

- Philippines

14 days service with civilian organisations from 8 November 2013 to 16 December 2013.

- Samoa

7 days service with civilian, police and rescue agencies from 29 September 2009 to 10 October 2009 following the 2009 Samoa earthquake and tsunami

- Somalia

30 days service with civilian organisations in Somalia from 1 March 1992 to 1 January 1996

- South Sudan

30 days service with civilian organisations in Southern Sudan from 23 May 1992

- South Vietnam

30 days service with civilian organisations South Vietnam from 29 May 1964 to 30 April 1975

- Ukraine

Australian Government response to the downing of Malaysia Airlines Flight 17 on 17 July 2014.
- 7 days service at crash site (Zone 1) and in conflict zone (Zone 2) Ukraine;
- 14 days service in conflict zone (Zone 2) Ukraine; or
- 14 days deployed to Disaster Victim Identification (DVI) operation (Zone 3) in The Netherlands.

- Vanuatu

30 days service with civilian organisations from 13 March 2015 to 1 April 2015.

- West Africa

30 days service with civilian organisations from 1 March 2014 to 29 March 2016.

== Recipients ==
The year is listed as such in the table due to the award numbers being made public based on the financial year in the Governor Generals Annual Report.

Year	Number awarded	Notes
1999–2014	3,075	List the number of awards issued between 16 April 1999 to 30 June 2014. This annual report period includes the establishment of nineteen clasps
2014–15	371	This annual report includes the establishment of the clasp Ukraine.
2015–16	201	
2016–17	14	
2017–18	6	
2018–19	77	This annual report includes the establishment of the clasps Vanuatu, West Africa, Philippines and Nepal.
2019–20	843	This annual report includes the establishment of the clasp British Colombia II.
2020–21	154	
2021–22	49	
2022–23	167	
2023–24	7	
2024–25	3	
2025–26	0	

== See also ==
- Australian Honours Order of Precedence
