= National Emergency Medal =

Australian national award

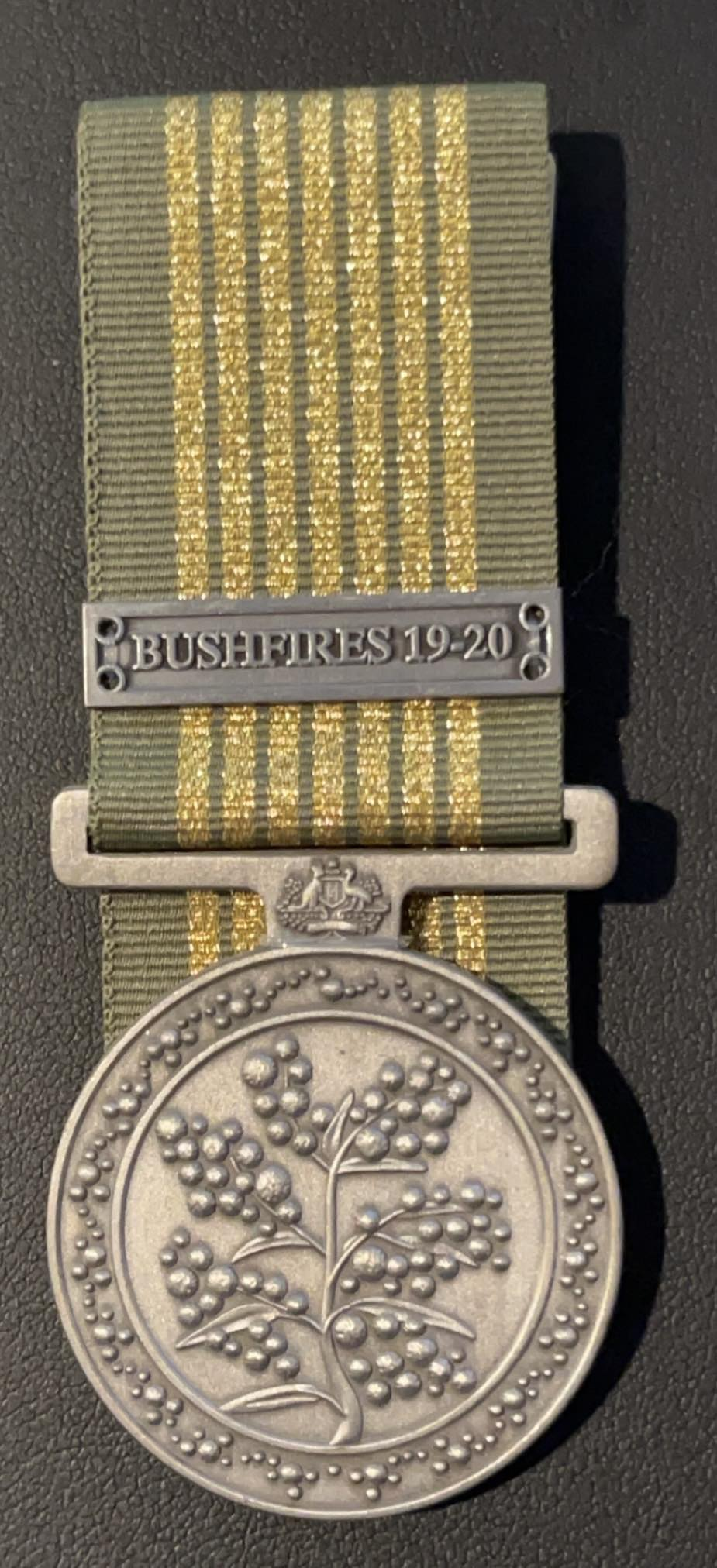
- The National Emergency Medal with 'BUSHFIRES 19–20' clasp
- Type: Medal
- Awarded for: Sustained service
- Presented by: Australia
- Eligibility: Members of identified organisations or individuals who rendered sustained service during specified dates in specified places in response to nationally significant emergencies within Australia
- Clasps: VIC FIRES 09; QLD 2010–11; TC DEBBIE 2017; NTH QLD 2019; BUSHFIRES 19–20; FLOODS FEB 2022; FLOODS NOV 2022
- Status: Currently awarded
- Established: 23 October 2011

Highlights
- Total: 96,344
- Ribbon bar of the medal

Order of Wear
- Next (higher): Humanitarian Overseas Service Medal
- Next (lower): Civilian Service Medal 1939–1945
- Related: Humanitarian Overseas Service Medal

The National Emergency Medal is an award of the Australian honours system given for sustained service during a nationally significant emergency; or to other persons who rendered significant service in response to such emergencies. The medal was established by Queen Elizabeth II in October 2011. The medal is awarded for events specifically set out by regulation or may be awarded upon the recommendation of the National Emergency Medal Committee for significant service.

== Description ==
The National Emergency Medal is a circular medal, ensigned with the Australian coat of arms. The obverse depicts a central image of a golden wattle branch. Surrounding the image at the edge is a further depiction of the flowering wattle. The centre of the reverse has the same border as the obverse, but in the centre it details by inscription the award and the recipient.

The National Emergency Medal ribbon colours match the colours of the Humanitarian Overseas Service Medal ribbon. The colours of the ribbon are gold and eucalyptus green. Gold symbolises the Australian sun, optimism and hope. Eucalyptus green complements the symbolism of the medal design. The seven gold coloured bands represent Australia’s six states, with the seventh representing the territories.

== Clasps ==
=== VIC FIRES 09 ===
Those who performed service during the Black Saturday bushfires and meet certain criteria are recognised with the "VIC FIRES 09" clasp. Requirements include:

- Service must be in the protection of lives and property, or in the service of interests, that are not their own, in direct response to the emergency, including support that enables or facilitates the emergency response;
- The geographical area is the State of Victoria;
- The qualifying period begins on 28 January 2009 and ends on 5 March 2009;
- The minimum duration of service that a person is required to have completed to qualify is fourteen days in paid service, including at least two days in the period beginning on 7 February and ending on 14 February 2009. For unpaid service the required length is seven days, including at least one day in the period beginning on 7 February and ending on 14 February 2009.

=== QLD 2010–11 ===
Those who performed service during the Queensland Floods and Cyclone Yasi and met certain criteria are recognised by the "QLD 2010–11" clasp. Requirements include:

- Service must be in the protection of lives and property, or in the service of interests, that are not their own, in direct response to the emergency, including support that enables or facilitates the emergency response;
- The geographical area is the State of Queensland;
- The qualifying period begins on 21 December 2010 and ends on 14 February 2011;
- The minimum duration of service that a person is required to have completed to qualify is twenty eight days of paid service or fourteen days of unpaid service.

=== TC DEBBIE 2017 ===
Those who performed service during the Cyclone Debbie and met certain criteria are recognised by the "TC DEBBIE 2017" clasp. Requirements include:

- Service in the protection of lives and property; in the service of interests, the recipients own; in direct response to the emergency which includes support enabling or facilitating the emergency response;
- Qualifying service must be in the geographical areas of Australia consisting of the following local government areas, as of 25 March 2017:

- New South Wales: Ballina, Byron, Clarence Valley, Kyogle, Lismore, Richmond Valley, Tenterfield, Tweed.
- Queensland: Banana, Brisbane, Bundaberg, Burdekin, Central Highlands, Charters Towers, Fraser Coast, Gladstone, Gold Coast City, Goondiwindi, Gympie, Hinchinbrook, Ipswich, Isaac, Livingstone, Lockyer Valley, Logan, Mackay, Maranoa, Moreton Bay, Noosa, North Burnett, Palm Island, Redland, Rockhampton, Scenic Rim, Somerset, South Burnett, Southern Downs, Sunshine Coast, Toowoomba, Townsville, Western Downs, Whitsunday, Woorabinda Aboriginal;

- The qualifying period of service is from 25 March 2017 to 10 April 2017;
- Persons must have served 5 days during the qualifying period of service to qualify for award of the medal.

=== NTH QLD 2019 ===
Those who performed service during the 2019 Townsville flood and met certain criteria are recognised by the "NTH QLD 2019" clasp. Requirements include:

- Service in the protection of lives and property; in the service of interests, the recipients own; in direct response to the emergency which includes support enabling or facilitating the emergency response;
- Qualifying service must be in the geographical areas of Australia consisting of the following local government areas, as of 25 March 2017:

- Queensland: Aurukun, Barcoo, Boulia, Burdekin, Burke, Cairns, Carpentaria, Cassowary Coast, Charters Towers, Cloncurry, Cook, Croydon, Diamantina, Douglas, Etheridge, Flinders, Hinchinbrook, Hope Vale, Kowanyama River, Lockhart River, Longreach, Mackay, Mapoon, Mareeba, McKinlay, Mornington, Mount Isa, Napranum, Northern Peninsula, Palm Island, Pormpuraaw, Richmond, Torres, Torres Strait Island, Townsville, Whitsunday, Winton, Wujal Wujal, Yarrabah;

- The qualifying period of service is from 25 January 2019 to 14 February 2019;
- Persons must have served 5 days during the qualifying period of service to qualify for award of the medal.

=== BUSHFIRES 19–20 ===
Those who performed service during the 2019–20 Australian bushfire season and met certain criteria are recognised by the "BUSHFIRES 19–20" clasp. Requirements include:

- Service must be in the protection of lives and property; or in the service of interests, that are not their own; in direct response to the emergency (including support that enables or facilitates the emergency response);
- Qualifying service must be in the geographical areas of Australia, in one of the nominated 108 local government areas in the States of New South Wales, Queensland, South Australia, and Victoria, and the Australian Capital Territory;
- The qualifying period of service, specifically stipulated for each of the 108 local government areas, a period between 6 September 2019 to 20 February 2020;
- Persons must have served 5 days during the qualifying period of service to qualify for award of the medal.

=== FLOODS FEB 2022 ===
Those who performed service during the 2022 eastern Australia floods and met certain criteria are recognised by the "FLOODS FEB 2022" clasp. Requirements include:

- Service must be in the protection of lives and property; or in the service of interests, that are not their own; in direct response to the emergency (including support that enables or facilitates the emergency response);
- Qualifying service must be in the geographical areas of Australia, in one of the nominated 21 local government areas in the States of New South Wales and Queensland;

- New South Wales: Ballina, Byron, Clarence Valley, Kyogle, Lismore, Richmond Valley, Tweed.
- Queensland: Brisbane, Fraser Coast, Gold Coast, Gympie, Ipswich, Lockyer Valley, Logan, Moreton Bay, Noosa, Redland, Scenic Rim. Somerset, Sunshine Coast, Toowoomba.

- The qualifying period of service, specifically stipulated for each of the 21 local government areas, a period between 23 February 2022 and ending on 4 March 2022;
- Persons must have served 5 days during the qualifying period of service to qualify for award of the medal.

=== FLOODS NOV 2022 ===
Those who performed service during the 2022 south eastern Australia floods and met certain criteria are recognised by the "FLOODS NOV 2022" clasp. Requirements include:

- Service must be in the protection of lives and property; or in the service of interests, that are not their own; in direct response to the emergency (including support that enables or facilitates the emergency response);
- Qualifying service must be in the geographical areas of Australia, in one of the nominated 5 local government areas in the State of New South Wales;

- New South Wales: Cabonne, Cowra, Forbes, Lachlan, Parkes.

- The qualifying period of service, specifically stipulated for each of the 5 local government areas, a period between 14 November 2022 and ending on 27 November 2022;
- Persons must have served 5 days during the qualifying period of service to qualify for award of the medal.

== Recipients ==
The year is listed as such in the table due to the award numbers being made public based on the financial year in the Governor-General's Annual Report.

| Year | Number awarded | Notes |
|---|---|---|
| 2011–2014 | 14,658 | List the number of awards issued between 23 October 2011 to 30 June 2014. This annual report period includes the establishment of the clasps VIC FIRES 09 and QLD 2010–11. |
| 2014–15 | 9,452 | |
| 2015–16 | 381 | |
| 2016–17 | 156 | |
| 2017–18 | 113 | |
| 2018–19 | 141 | |
| 2019–20 | 90 | This annual report includes the establishment of the clasps TC DEBBIE 2017 and NTH QLD 2019. |
| 2020–21 | 4,945 | This annual report includes the establishment of the clasp BUSHFIRES 19–20. |
| 2021–22 | 32,067 | |
| 2022–23 | 18,919 | |
| 2023–24 | 7,230 | This annual report includes the establishment of the clasp FLOODS FEBRUARY 2022. |
| 2024–25 | 10,734 | |
| 2025–26 | 6,971 | |

== Criticism ==
The criteria for award of the National Emergency Medal has been criticised as not honouring the efforts of many volunteers. Due to safety issues many volunteers were rotated out of disaster areas after a few days and unable to spend the required amount of time on the ground in the disaster area to qualify for the medal.

Lucy Kippist, writer at The Punch stated the Prime Minister after announcing the creation of the new medal "neglected to mention that most of the volunteers who served in those regions were completely ineligible for the award", with one reader described the award as "confusing, disorganised and grossly unfair way the National Emergency Medal was put together in the first place. Thousands of volunteers across the country also expected to be on that list".

Despite being a global pandemic and declared a human biosecurity emergency in Australia, the 2020–2022 COVID-19 event was not a declared nationally significant emergency. As a result, some agencies have produced a state honour such as the South Australia Police 'SAPOL Emergency Response Active Service Medal (COVID-19 Major Emergency Declaration)' and the Queensland Police inaugural 'Emergency Response Medal (COVID-19 clasp).

The criteria for awards is also inconsistent across operations with all recent awards only requiring 5 days qualifying service, paid or unpaid. But the originating emergencies requiring 14 unpaid or 28 paid days of service. The National Emergency Medal committee has refused to review the extended criteria of the original operations, and has refused FOI requests for its documented reasoning behind this decision.

== See also ==
- 2010–2011 Queensland Flood and Cyclone Citation
- NSW Premier's Bushfire Emergency Citation
