= New South Wales Police Force Commissioner's Sesquicentenary Citation =

Commissioner's Sesquicentenary Citation
- Type: Service in the Office of Constable
- Awarded for: Employed with the NSW Police Force between March 1, 2012 to February 28, 2013
- Country: Australia
- Presented by: New South Wales Police Force
- Eligibility: Sworn and unsworn employees
- Status: No longer awarded
- Established: March 1, 2012
- Final award: February 28, 2013

Highlights
- Total awarded posthumously: Senior Constable David James RIXON VA BM

Precedence
- Next (higher): New South Wales Police Force Commissioner's Olympic Citation
- Related: National Police Service Medal

The New South Wales Police Force Commissioner's Sesquicentenary Citation, also known as the Sesquicentenary 150th Citation, is a decoration for police officers and unsworn personnel of the New South Wales Police Force. First instituted in 2012, the citations are a metal device, with thin silver surround, with navy blue and light blue striped enamel centre and silver numerals of '1862' '150' '2012' with a depiction of the State of NSW and sillitoe tartan.

== History ==
The 'New South Wales Police Force Commissioner's Sesquicentenary Citation was instituted after being approved by the Minister for Police and the New South Wales Police Force Commissioner in celebration of the NSW Police Force’s 150th Anniversary year. Sesquicentenary meaning "the one-hundred-and-fiftieth anniversary of a significant event" with this marking the formation of the New South Wales Police Force on 1 March 1862. It is the oldest and largest police force in Australia.

== Criteria ==
For an individual to become eligible for this award the Commissioner must be either a sworn or unsworn member employed with the NSW Police Force between March 1, 2012 to February 28, 2013.

1. That an officer/employee has been a serving member of a Police Force
1. That the officer/employee has served efficiently for the qualifying period

== Length of service ==
Awarded to serving, and former serving sworn officers of the New South Wales Police Force who have completed service within the qualifying period. It may also be awarded to a police officer who dies in the line of duty during said period.

== Appearance ==
The citation was designed with thin silver surround, with navy blue and light blue striped enamel centre and silver numerals of '1862' '150' '2012' with a depiction of the State of NSW and silitoe tartan. The citation is accompanied by a miniature ribbon bar. The miniature is worn on mess dress on formal occasions and the ribbon bar is worn daily on uniform. The citation is a right side decoration and is worn 5 millimetres above the nameplate.
