= Sri Lanka Police Vishishta Seva Padakkama =

- Type: Medal
- Awarded for: Distinguished Service
- Presented by: Sri Lanka
- Eligibility: Members of the Sri Lanka Police
- Status: Currently awarded
- Established: 1972
- Ribbon bar

Precedence
- Next (higher): Sri Lanka Police Weeratha Padakkama
- Next (lower): Deergha Sewa Padakkama
- Related: Vishista Seva Vibhushanaya

The Sri Lanka Police Vishishta Seva Padakkama ("Sri Lanka Police Distinguished Service Medal") is awarded to senior police officers in Sri Lanka for Meritorious Performance of Police duties. It is similar to the Vishista Seva Vibhushanaya of the Sri Lanka Armed Forces. The medal replaced the Ceylon Police Medal for Meritorious Service which was awarded until Ceylon became a Republic in 1972.

== See also ==
- Awards and decorations of the Sri Lanka Police
- Vishista Seva Vibhushanaya
