= Janaraja Padakkama =

Janaraja Padakkama (Police)
- Type: Commemorative Medal
- Presented by: Sri Lanka
- Eligibility: Members of the Sri Lanka Police
- Established: 1972
- Ribbon bar

Precedence
- Next (higher): Sewa Padakkama
- Next (lower): President's Inauguration Medal
- Related: Republic of Sri Lanka Armed Services Medal

The Janaraja Padakkama ("Republic Medal") was awarded to police officers in Sri Lanka who were in service on 22 May 1972, when Ceylon became a republic. It is similar to the Republic of Sri Lanka Armed Services Medal issued to the armed forces.

== See also ==
- Awards and decorations of the Sri Lanka Police
- Republic of Sri Lanka Armed Services Medal
