= Sri Lanka Police Long Service Medal =

- Type: Medal
- Awarded for: Long Service
- Presented by: Sri Lanka
- Eligibility: Members of the Sri Lanka Police
- Status: Currently awarded
- Established: 1972
- Ribbon bar

Precedence
- Next (higher): Sri Lanka Police Vishishta Seva Padakkama
- Next (lower): Desha Puthra Sammanaya
- Related: Ceylon Police Long Service Medal

The Sri Lanka Police Long Service Medal is awarded to police officers in Sri Lanka of and below the rank of Chief Inspector in Sri Lanka Police for completing 18 years of unblemished service. The medal replaced the Ceylon Police Long Service Medal which was awarded until Ceylon became a Republic in 1972.

== See also ==
- Awards and decorations of the Sri Lanka Police
- Ceylon Police Long Service Medal
- Police Long Service and Good Conduct Medal
