= Police Federation =

In the United Kingdom, a Police Federation is a statutory association that represents police officers. As policing is devolved, there are separate federations for each part of the United Kingdom:

- Police Federation of England and Wales
- Police Federation for Northern Ireland
- Scottish Police Federation

There is also a federation for the Ministry of Defence Police:

- Defence Police Federation
