= African Police Medal for Meritorious Service =

- Ribbon bar of the medal
- Type: Long service medal
- Awarded for: Acts of gallantry, meritorious, and long service
- Presented by: the British Empire
- Eligibility: Non-European members of the police forces of British African colonies
- Status: Replaced by the Colonial Police Medal and Colonial Police Long Service Medal
- Established: 14 July 1915
- Final award: 1948 (Southern Rhodesia - BSAP)

Order of Wear
- Next (higher): Fire Brigade Long Service and Good Conduct Medal
- Next (lower): Royal Canadian Mounted Police Long Service Medal
- Related: Police Long Service and Good Conduct Medal

The African Police Medal for Meritorious Service was a medal awarded to non-European police officers in British African colonies. Awarded from 1915 to 1938, the medal was replaced by the Colonial Police Medal and the Colonial Police Long Service Medal.

== Appearance ==
The African Police Medal for Meritorious Service is circular, of silver. The obverse bears a crowned and uniformed effigy of George V surrounded by the inscription GEORGIVS V REX ET IND : IMP :. The reverse depict the Tudor Crown surmounted by a crowned lion encircled by a wreath tied at the base. Surrounding the central design is the inscription FOR MERITORIOUS SERVICE IN THE POLICE • AFRICA •.

The medal is suspended from a claw suspension with a ring through its ribbon. The ribbon is yellow with edges of red.

== See also ==
- Police Long Service and Good Conduct Medal
