= Sri Lanka Police Weeratha Padakkama =

- Type: Medal
- Awarded for: Gallantry
- Presented by: Sri Lanka
- Eligibility: Members of the Sri Lanka Police
- Status: Currently awarded
- Established: 1972
- Ribbon bar

Precedence
- Next (higher): Janadhipathi Police Weeratha Padakkama
- Next (lower): Sri Lanka Police Vishishta Seva Padakkama
- Related: Colonial Police Medal

The Sri Lanka Police Weeratha Padakkama ("Sri Lanka Police Police Gallantry Medal") is awarded to police officers in Sri Lanka for gallantry or brave performance of duty. It is awarded by the Inspector General of Police (IGP). The medal replaced the Ceylon Police Medal for Gallantry which was awarded until Ceylon became a Republic in 1972.

== See also ==
- Awards and decorations of the Sri Lanka Police
- Colonial Police Medal
