= South Australia Police Service Medal =

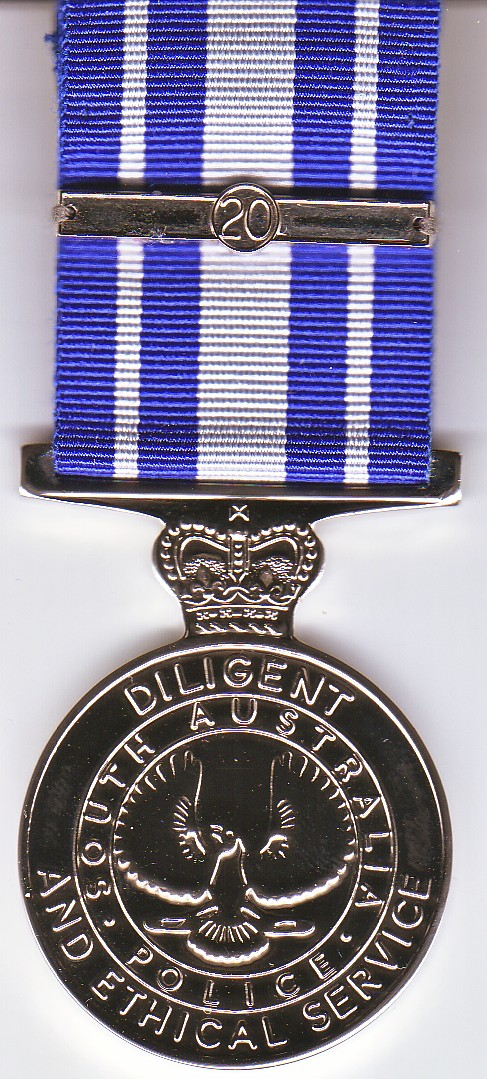
- Obverse of medal and ribbon
- Type: Medal
- Awarded for: long and diligent service
- Presented by: Government of South Australia
- Eligibility: members of the South Australia Police
- Post-nominals: nil
- Clasps: ten year increments - 10, 20, 30, 40.
- Status: Currently awarded
- Established: 1998

The South Australia Police Service Medal was established in 1998 to recognise long and diligent service to the South Australia Police.

== Criteria ==
The medal may be awarded to sworn and unsworn employees who have completed a period of ten years continuous, diligent and ethical service to the South Australia Police after 14 February 1975. The award consists of a medal, miniature, and ribbon bar. Employees who have completed additional ten-year increments are awarded twenty, thirty, and forty year clasps.

== Description and use ==
The South Australia Police Service Medal is a circular silver medal, 38 mm in diameter, surmounted with St Edward's Crown. The obverse displays the piping shrike (gymnorhina tibicen leuconota) emblem of the Government of South Australia, surrounded by the words 'DILIGENT AND ETHICAL SERVICE' and 'SOUTH AUSTRALIA POLICE'.

The medal is suspended by a ribbon coloured in vertical blue and white stripes in an inverse colour pattern to the Police Long Service and Good Conduct Medal that had previously been issued to Australian Police. This ribbon is shared with the Tasmania Police Medal, Victoria Police Medal, and Western Australia Police Medal.

The blank reverse is engraved at its center with the recipient's surname and initials.

According to SAPOL instructions, serving members should wear their medal on the right breast on all occasions when full size orders, decorations, and medals are worn.

== Presentations ==
The Government of South Australia and the South Australia Police conduct regular presentation ceremonies for this award. They are usually held at Fort Largs Police Academy.

== See also ==
- Australian Honours Order of Precedence
