= IAWP Excellence in Performance =

International Association of Women Police Excellence in Performance Award is given to an officer who distinguishes herself through superior attention to duty or outstanding investigative effort, which leads to the identification, location, or arrest of a major criminal or criminal activity.

Women police officers around the globe compete for the International Association of Women Police performance award. These women officers are considered to be the definitive identification of a near-perfect officer. The annual program is highlighted on their official website, with the period for nominations running from about January through March of a year. The honoree is featured in the quarterly WomenPolice Magazine which also draws attention to her police department, her superiors, and her colleagues. Nominations are received from around the world and filtered by an international committee which reviews each nomination and makes recommendations for final selection to the Chair, Annual Awards Program, and the President, International Association of Women Police. The Awards Luncheon held during the annual Training Conference each year, highlights the woman officer's achievements and career.
