= Janadhipathi Police Weeratha Padakkama =

- Type: Medal
- Awarded for: "acts of exceptional courage and skill at the cost of their lives, or [exhibiting] conspicuous devotion to duty"
- Presented by: Sri Lanka
- Eligibility: Members of the Sri Lanka Police
- Status: Currently awarded
- Established: 1972
- Ribbon bar

Precedence
- Next (lower): Sri Lanka Police Weeratha Padakkama
- Related: Queen's Police Medal

The Janadhipathi Police Weeratha Padakkama ("President's Police Gallantry Medal") is awarded to police officers in Sri Lanka for gallantry or brave performance of duty. It is awarded by the President of Sri Lanka on the recommendations of the Inspector General of Police (IGP). The medal replaced the Queen's Police Medal which was awarded until Ceylon became a Republic in 1972.

== See also ==
- Awards and decorations of the Sri Lanka Police
- Queen's Police Medal
