= Singapore Police Service Long Service and Good Conduct Medal =

- Medal and ribbon
- Type: Medal
- Awarded for: Minimum 10 years of service in the Singapore Police Force
- Presented by: Singapore Police Force
- Eligibility: Regular, volunteer or national-service personnel from the Singapore Police Force, Singapore Prisons Service and Central Narcotics Bureau
- Status: Currently awarded

Precedence
- Next (higher): Singapore Police Force Long Service and Good Conduct Medal (30 Years)
- Next (lower): Singapore Police Force Good Service Medal

The Singapore Police Force Long Service and Good Conduct Medal is awarded to officers in recognition of his long and exemplary service and good conduct in the Singapore Police Force. An officer may receive the Medal if he has completed 10 years of continuous qualifying service.

A 1st Clasp to the Medal is awarded to an officer on completing 15 years of qualifying service in recognition of his long and exemplary service and good conduct in the Singapore Police Force.

A 2nd Clasp to the Medal is awarded to an officer on completing 20 years of qualifying service in recognition of his long and exemplary service and good conduct in the Singapore Police Force.

== Description ==
- The medal consists of a hexagonal medal in 925 sterling silver.
- The obverse side of the medal bears the Coat of arms of Singapore encircled by the inscription “POLIS REPABLIK SINGAPURA”.
- The reverse side of the medal bear the design of a lion's head with a laurel wreath beneath the lion's head and the inscription “LONG SERVICE AND GOOD CONDUCT” encircling the lion's head.
- The centre of the ribbon have a blue strip of 5 mm in width, flanked on each side by a white stripe of 3 mm in width, followed by another blue stripe of 3 mm in width, a golden yellow stripe of 3 mm in width and a blue stripe of 5 mm in width.
