= Sri Lanka Police First Aid Medal =

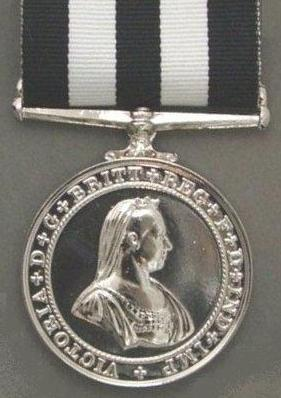
- Medal, obverse
- Type: Medal
- Presented by: Sri Lanka
- Eligibility: Members of the Sri Lanka Police
- Status: Currently awarded
- Ribbon bar

Precedence
- Next (higher): Sri Lanka Police 125th Anniversary Medal
- Next (lower): Northern Humanitarian Operations Medal
- Related: Service Medal of the Order of St John

The Sri Lanka Police First Aid Medal (Sinhala: ශ්‍රී ලංකා පොලිස් ප්‍රථමාධාර පදක්කම Śrī Laṃkā Polis Prathamādhāra Padakkama) is awarded to police officers in Sri Lanka for being successful in the first aid examination for ten consecutive years. Its design is based on the Service Medal of the Order of St John.

== Description ==
The cupro-nickel, rhodium-plated medal features the head of Queen Victoria and the legend VICTORIA + D + G + BRITT + REG + F + D + IND + IMP on one side, while the other displays the legend MAGNUS · PRIORATUS · ORDINIS · HOSPITALIS · SANCTI · JOHANNIS · JERUSALEM · IN · ANGLIA (Grand Priory of the Order of the Hospital of St. John of Jerusalem in England) along with five equally sized circles in a cross holding individual heraldic icons supported by sprawling St John's Wort. These are the St Edward’s Crown, the shield of Great Britain, two icons of the Order of St John in England, and the cipher bearing the feathers of the Prince of Wales. The "only British medal to retain the head of Queen Victoria on a current issue", the image utilized is based on a bust of the queen created by Princess Louise, Duchess of Argyll.

The Medal is suspended from a ribbon that is 1.5 inches (38 mm) wide with five equally spaced stripes, of black and white. Where additional services beyond those required for the award have been performed, the ribbon may display bars and laurel leaves.
