= Western Australia Police Star =

Award for police in Western Australia

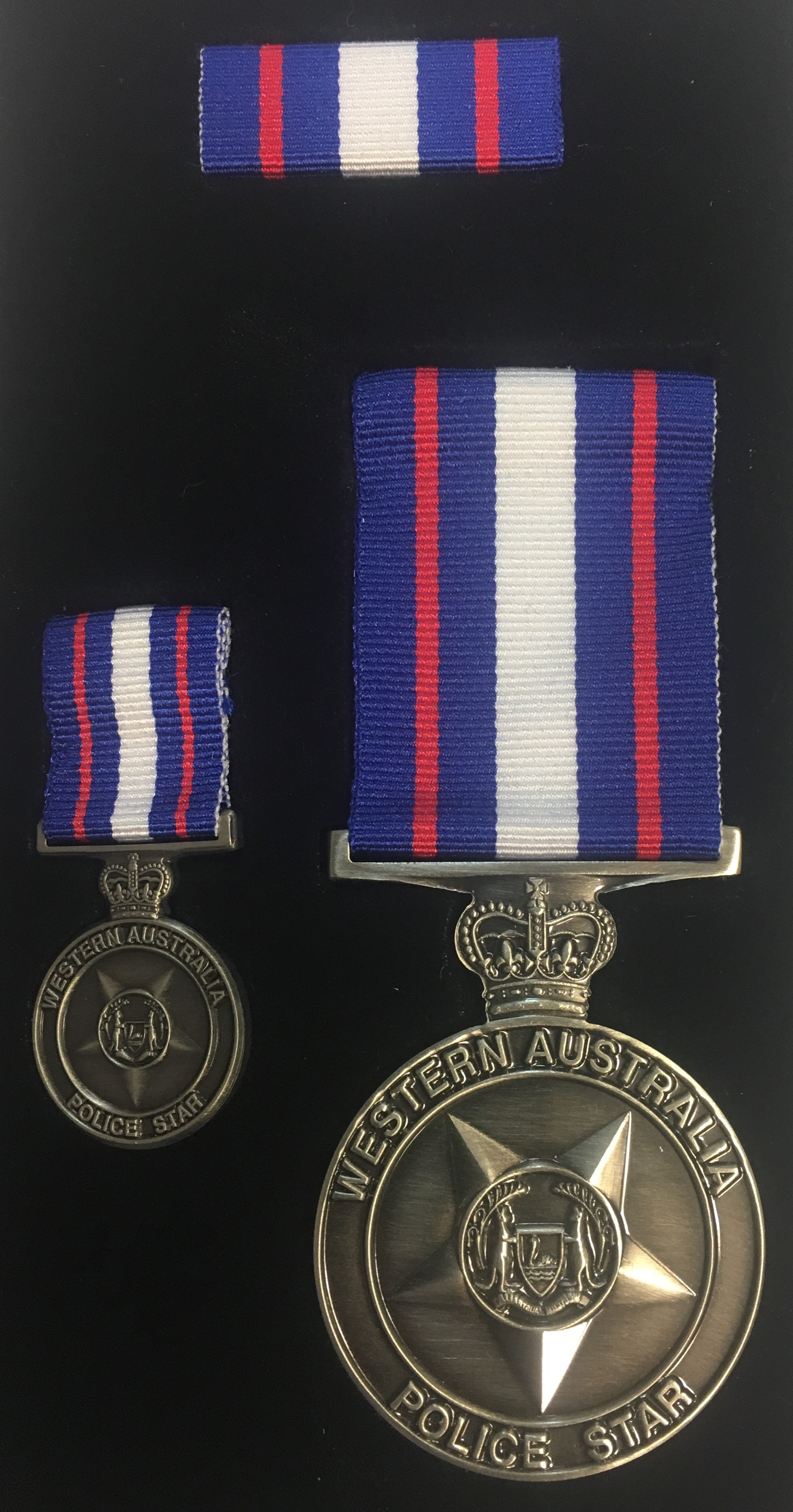
WA Police Star

The Western Australia Police Star was established to recognise Western Australia Police personnel who are killed or seriously injured whilst carrying out their primary functions on or off duty.

== Criteria ==
The medal is awarded to Western Australia Police sworn personnel who are killed or seriously injured whilst carrying out their primary functions whether on or off duty. The award consists of a medal, miniature, and ribbon bar. No clasps are issued with the medal.

== Description ==
The Western Australia Police Star is a circular bronze-gold coloured medal, 38 mm in diameter, surmounted with St Edward's Crown. The obverse displays the Western Australia Coat of Arms within a five pointed star, surrounded by the words 'WESTERN AUSTRALIA POLICE STAR'.

The blank reverse is engraved at its center with the recipient's initials, surname and police regimental number.

== Presentations ==
The first presentation of Western Australia Police Star was made to Constable Ryan Marron on the 26 May 2017, by Police Commissioner Karl O'Callaghan at the Western Australian Police Academy. Constable Marron had been left severely disabled and unable to walk or speak after contracting a mosquito-borne virus while stationed at Balgo in 2011.

On the 4 August 2017, 78 Police Stars were awarded to the families of deceased officers, and several serving and retired officers who had sustained a permanent injury or illness as a result of their service. The oldest Police Star was awarded to the family of Constable Patrick Hackett, who was murdered in 1884.

== See also ==
- Australian honours system
- Western Australia Police honours system
- Commissioner's Medal for Excellence
- Western Australia Police Medal
