= Police Diligent and Ethical Service Medal =

New South Wales Police Medal
- Type: Service in the Office of Constable
- Awarded for: 10 years of service
- Presented by: New South Wales Police Force
- Eligibility: Full time police officers
- Post-nominals: (no post-nominal entitlement)
- Clasps: Clasp to the medal is awarded for each additional 5 years of diligent and ethical service
- Status: Currently awarded
- Established: 5 February 2002

Precedence
- Next (higher): Commissioners Community Service Commendatiom
- Next (lower): Commissioners Unit Citation
- Related: National Police Service Medal

The Police Diligent and Ethical Service Medal, also known as the New South Wales Police Medal, is a decoration for police officers of the New South Wales Police Force. First instituted in 2002, the 36 mm medals are copper, with a nickel coating. The medal is awarded to sworn members and former sworn members of the New South Wales Police Force who have completed ten years of diligent and ethical service. The clasp to the medal is awarded for each additional 5 years of diligent and ethical service.

== Criteria ==
The Minister for Police and the Commissioner of the New South Wales Police Force gave their approval before the Police Diligent and Ethical Service Medal was established.

For an officer to become eligible for this award the Commissioner must make a recommendation to the Minister, and in doing so, is required to certify the following:

1. That an officer has been a serving member of a Police Force
2. That the officer has served efficiently for the qualifying period
3. That the officer's character has been very good

== Length of service ==
Awarded to serving, and former serving sworn officers of the New South Wales Police Force who have completed ten years of diligent and ethical service. It may also be awarded to a police officer who dies in the line of duty with less than 10 years service.

== Appearance ==
The medal was designed by Mrs Amanda Duncan, graphic artist for the New South Wales Police Force and features the crown of the sovereign, 'nemesis eagle' and the New South Wales State Badge struck on the front of the medal. The words ‘NSW Police – Diligent and Ethical Service’ appear on the outer edge. The name of the officer is inscribed on the reverse.

The medal is suspended by a ribbon, which consists of five vertical blue stripes. The stripes represent the colours of the NSW Police Force uniform. The medal is accompanied by a miniature and a ribbon bar. The miniature medal is worn on mess dress on formal occasions and the ribbon bar is worn daily on uniform. The medal is a right side decoration and is worn 5 millimetres below the nameplate.
