= Honour medal of the National Police =

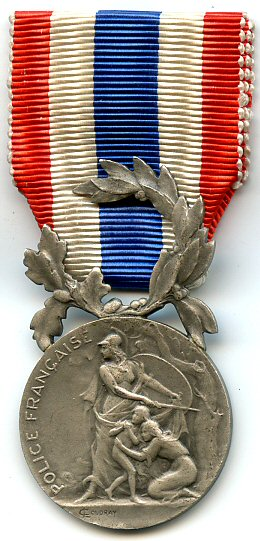
- Honour medal of the National Police (obverse)
- Type: Decoration
- Awarded for: Long service, conspicuous acts or outstanding service
- Country: France
- Presented by: Minister of the Interior (France)
- Clasps: Silver star
- Status: Active
- Established: 3 April 1903

Highlights
- Total awarded posthumously: Yes
- Ribbon Bar of the Medal

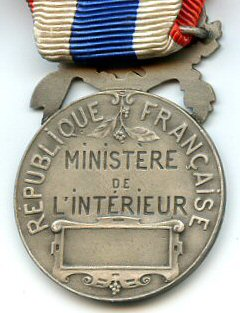
Reverse of the Honour medal of the National Police

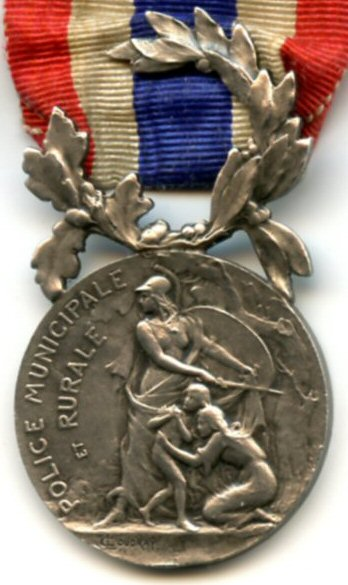
Early design of the obverse with original designation for the municipal and rural police

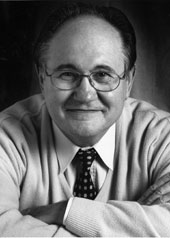
Commissaire Principal Guy Penaud, a recipient of the Honour medal of the National Police

The Honour medal of the National Police (French: "Médaille d’honneur de la Police nationale") is the highest award of the French National Police, which falls under the jurisdiction of the Ministry of the Interior.

== Award history ==
Created by the Decree of 3 April 1903 at the request of Monsieur Émile Combes, Minister of the Interior, the medal was originally called the "Médaille d’honneur de la Police Municipale et Rurale" (English: "Honour medal of the rural and municipal police"). The decree of 17 November 1936 will rename it the "Médaille d’honneur de la Police française" (English: French Police honour medal"). Finally, Decree No. 96-342 of 22 April 1996 will give the medal its current designation.

The decree of 4 February 1905 allows its award upon application to the Governor-General of Algeria, to officers of the Police Municipale et Rurale posted to Algeria with at least 20 years of impeccable service.

The award was extended in 1972, to administrative staff and senior officers of the National Police.

== Award statute ==
The medal is awarded under the following conditions:

- to police officers, for 20 years of service;
- to members of the administrative staff, for 25 years of combined civil and military service.

Police officers may use up to 10 years of service performed in the military, the Gendarmerie Nationale, Republican Guard, Paris Fire Brigade, Marseille Naval Fire Battalion, French customs or forestry services.

The award may be bestowed posthumously regardless of time of service. It may also be awarded in exceptional cases for acts of courage or exceptional service to the police force by national or foreign police officers regardless of time of service. Under these circumstances, the medal ribbon is adorned with a five pointed silver star.

Award ceremonies take place annually in December. Recipients are announced by a decree of the Minister of the Interior, after consultation with the Director General of Police, on the proposal of the prefect or representative of the state for overseas territories.

== Award description ==
The Honour medal of the National Police, a design of engraver Marie Alexander Coudray, is a 27mm in diameter circular silver medal. The obverse bears the relief image of the protecting Republic, in the form of a standing helmeted woman holding a sword and a shield, protecting a kneeling woman pulling a frightened child to her, behind them a tree. Along the right circumference, the semi circular relief inscription "POLICE FRANÇAISE" (English: "FRENCH POLICE").

The reverse bears at its bottom a framed rectangular area destined to receive the name of the recipient and year of the award. Along the upper medal circumference, the relief inscription "RÉPUBLIQUE FRANÇAISE" (English: "FRENCH REPUBLIC"), at its center, the inscription "MINISTÈRE DE L'INTÉRIEUR" (English: "INTERIOR MINISTRY").

The medal hangs from a 3cm wide silk moiré tricolour ribbon with an 8mm wide central blue stripe bordered by 6mm wide white stripes and 5mm red stripes at its edges. The ribbon's suspension loop is adorned with a crown composed of an olive branch and a sprig of oak with an opening on the right.

The Honour medal of the rural and municipal police in Algeria included a clasp on the ribbon consisting of a star placed on a crescent of Islam. Today, the only ribbon device is in the form of a silver five pointed star when the medal is awarded in exceptional circumstances.

== Noteworthy recipients (partial list) ==
- Divisional commissioner Roger Gavoury
- Principal commissioner Guy Penaud
- General Guy Parayre
- Police prefect Charles Luizet
- General Jacques Mignaux
- Police major Fabrice Martinez
- Police prefect Roger Marion
- General Roland Gilles
- Inspector general Jacques Fournier
- Police officer and hero of the resistance René Poitevin

== See also ==
- National Police (France)
- Ribbons of the French military and civil awards
