= Western Australia Police Commissioner's Medal for Excellence =

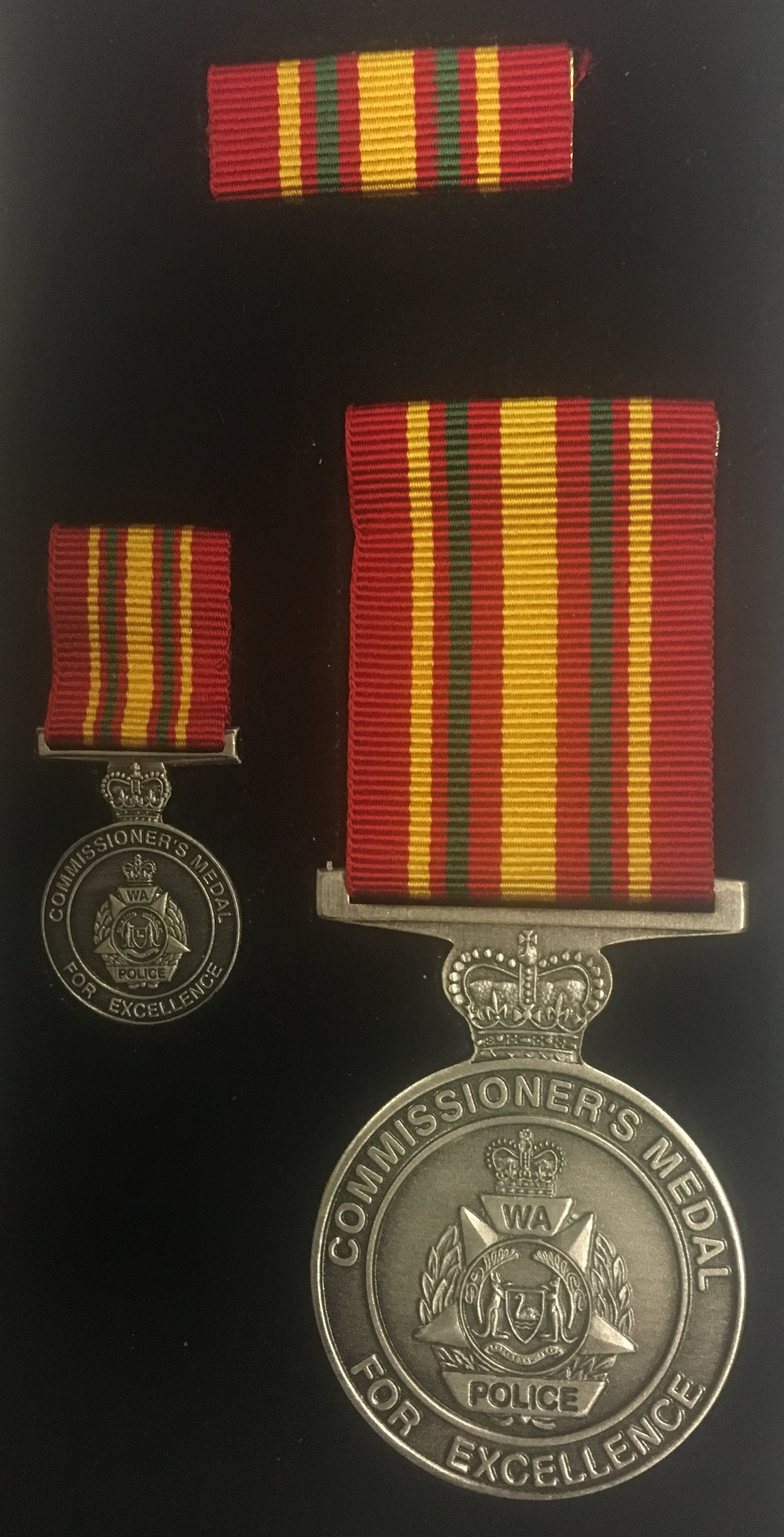
WA Police Commissioner's Medal for Excellence

The Western Australia Police Commissioner's Medal for Excellence was established to recognise Western Australia Police personnel who have consistently contributed to the achievement of the goals and objectives of the Western Australia Police.

== Criteria ==
The medal is awarded to Western Australia Police both sworn and unsworn personnel who have consistently contributed to the achievement of the goals and objectives of the Western Australia Police. The award consists of a medal, miniature, and ribbon bar. No clasps are issued with the medal.

== Description ==
The Western Australia Police Commissioner's Medal for Excellence is a circular bronze-gold coloured medal, 38 mm in diameter, surmounted with St Edward's Crown. The obverse displays the Western Australia Police logo, surrounded by the words 'COMMISSIONER'S MEDAL FOR EXCELLENCE'.

The blank reverse is engraved at its center with the recipient's initials, surname and police regimental number.

Six medals are issued each year.

== See also ==
- Australian honours system
- Western Australia Police honours system
- Western Australia Police Star
- Western Australia Police Medal
