= Ceylon Police Medal =

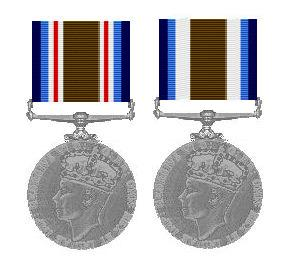
- Ceylon Police Medals for Gallantry (left) and for Meritorious Service (right)
- Type: Medal
- Awarded for: Gallantry or meritorious service
- Presented by: Ceylon
- Eligibility: Members of the Ceylon Police
- Status: Defunct
- Established: 1950
- Final award: 1972
- Ribbon bar for Gallantry Ribbon bar for Meritorious Service

Precedence
- Next (higher): Indian Police Medal
- Next (lower): Colonial Police Medal

The Ceylon Police Medal was awarded to police officers of the Ceylon Police, with two versions: for gallantry and for meritorious service. The number of medals for meritorious service was limited to a maximum of ten a year.

The medals were established in August 1950 to replace the Colonial Police Medal. They were themselves replaced by the Sri Lanka Police Weeratha Padakkama for gallantry and Sri Lanka Police Vishishta Seva Padakkama for meritorious service when Ceylon became a republic in 1972.

Circular and made of silver, the medals have the sovereign's effigy on the obverse, (George VI until 1953, then Elizabeth II). The reverse bears the image of an elephant with, above, the wording "Ceylon Police Service" and, below, either "For Gallantry" or "For Merit", as appropriate. The ribbon is suspended from a straight bar suspension, with awards for gallantry distinguished by two narrow red stripes in the ribbon design.

== List of recipients ==
- Debiwala Liyanage Shelton Peiris, Sub-inspector of Police - 1951
- Arthur Vivian Greg Nathanie, Inspector of Police - 1952
- Loku Banda Warnamoriya, Inspector of Police - 1952
- Madduma Banda Werapitiya, Inspector of Police - 1954
- Garvin Walter Liyanage, Sub-inspector of Police - 1956
- Karl Stephanus van Rooyen, Assistant Superintendent of Police - 1957
- B. Weerasinghe, Assistant Superintendent of Police in Charge of North-Central Province - 1958 anti-Tamil riots.
- D. D. S. Ranasinghe, HQ Inspector and Officer in Charge, Anuradhapura Police Station - 1958 anti-Tamil riots.
- Knrussomuttu Sehamalai, Inspector of Police - 1958

== See also ==
- Ceylon Police Long Service Medal
- Awards and decorations of the Sri Lanka Police
- Sri Lanka Police Weeratha Padakkama
- Sri Lanka Police Vishishta Seva Padakkama
