= Western Australia Police Medal =

Award for police in Western Australia

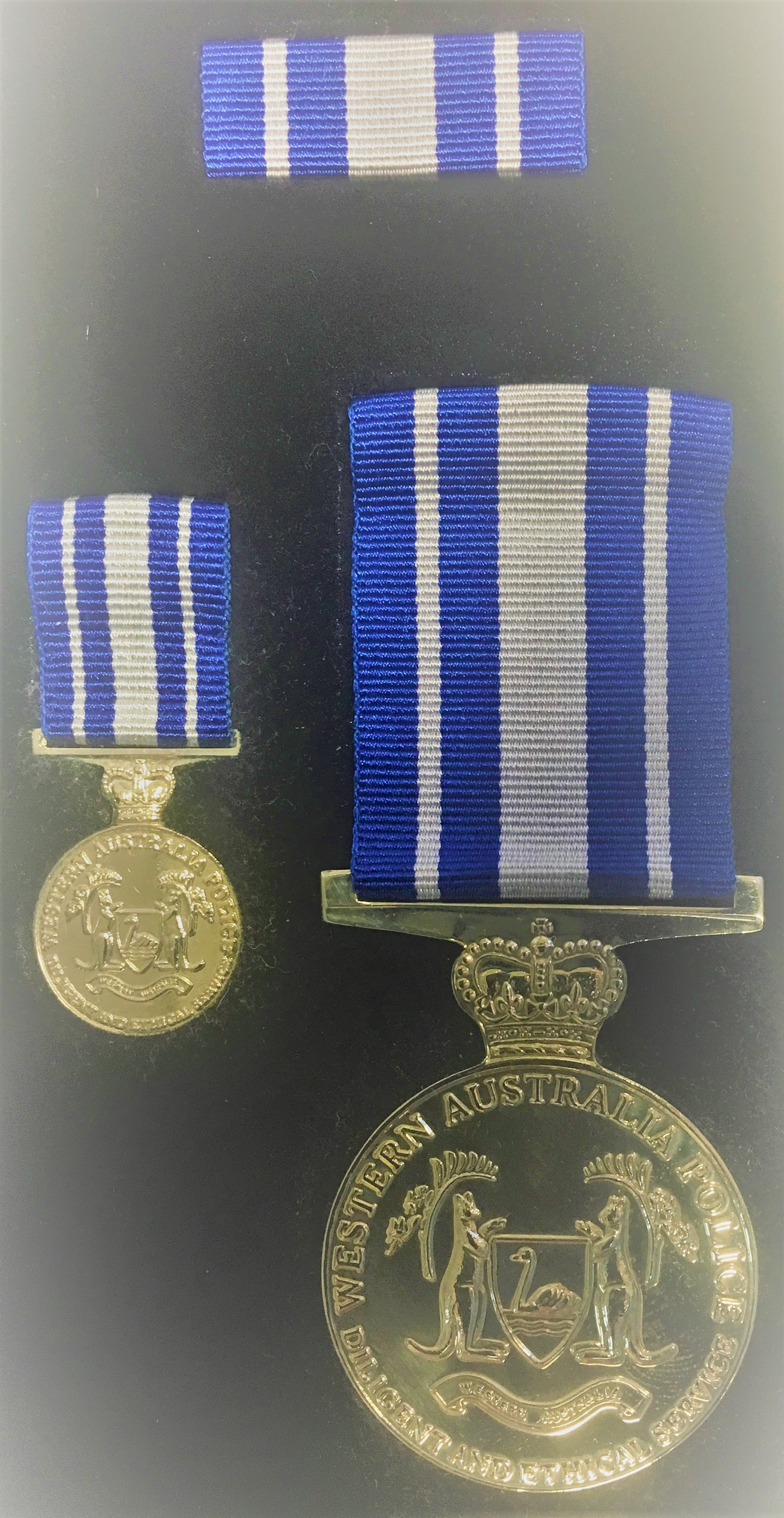
WA Police Medal

The Western Australia Police Medal was established to recognise Western Australia Police personnel who have completed sustained diligent and ethical service to the Western Australia Police.

== Criteria ==
The medal is awarded to Western Australia Police both sworn and unsworn personnel who have completed 10 years sustained diligent and ethical service to the Western Australia Police. The award consists of a medal, miniature, and ribbon bar. Clasps are issued with the medal in five year increments.

The medal was instituted on 12 February 2001 following approval at the National Commissioner's Conference Forum to support and encourage jurisdictional recognition of diligent and ethical service.

== Description ==
The Western Australia Police Medal is a circular cupro-nickel medal, 38 mm in diameter, surmounted with St Edward's Crown. The obverse displays the Western Australia Coat of Arms, surrounded by the words 'WESTERN AUSTRALIA POLICE - DILIGENT AND ETHICAL SERVICE'.

The medal is suspended by a ribbon coloured in vertical blue and white stripes in an inverse colour pattern to the Imperial Police Long Service and Good Conduct Medal that had previously been issued to Australian Police.

This ribbon is shared with the South Australia Police Medal, Tasmania Police Medal, and Victoria Police Medal.

The blank reverse is engraved at its centre with the recipient's initials, surname and police service number.

== See also ==
- Australian honours system
- Western Australia Police honours system
- Western Australia Police Star
- Commissioner's Medal for Excellence
