= Singapore Police Service Good Service Medal =

- Medal and ribbon
- Type: Medal
- Awarded for: Minimum 5 years of service in the Singapore Police Services
- Presented by: Singapore Police Force, Singapore Prisons Service, Central Narcotics Bureau
- Eligibility: Regular, volunteer or national-service personnel from the Singapore Police Force, Singapore Prisons Service and Central Narcotics Bureau
- Status: Currently awarded
- Ribbon bar

Precedence
- Next (higher): Singapore Police Service Long Service and Good Conduct Medal

The Singapore Police Service Good Service Medal may be awarded to an eligible person from the Singapore Police Force, Singapore Prisons Service and Central Narcotics Bureau in recognition of his good, efficient and faithful service. Eligible individuals must have provided regular or voluntary service, either part-time or a combination of part-time and full-time, for a continuous period of at least five years. For Police National Servicemen (PNSMen), two years of national service and three years of reserve service may be counted towards the minimum requirement.

== Description ==
- The obverse side of the Medal bear the Singapore Coat-of-Arms encircled by the inscription “POLIS REPABLIK SINGAPURA”.
- Prior to 2004, the obverse side of the Medal neared the Singapore Coat-of-Arms encircled by the inscription “ SINGAPORE POLICE SERVICE”.
- The reverse side of the Medal bear the inscription “FOR GOOD SERVICE” encircled by a laurel wreath.
- The ribbon has golden yellow stripe in the centre, flanked on each side by vertical blue stripes.
