= NSW Premier's Bushfire Emergency Citation =

The NSW Premier's Bushfire Emergency Citation is an award issued by the Premier of New South Wales for emergency service in the 2019–20 Australian bushfire season in New South Wales.

== Institution ==
Between June 2019 and May 2020, firefighters from the New South Wales Rural Fire Service, the New South Wales National Parks and Wildlife Service, and Fire and Rescue New South Wales responded to 11,264 fires across the state – with the loss of 6 personnel. Additionally, personnel from the State Emergency Service, New South Wales Police Force, Marine Rescue NSW, NSW Department of Primary Industries, NSW Local Land Services and the Australian Defence Force provided extensive support to state-wide firefighting operations.

On 20 September 2020, Premier of New South Wales Gladys Berejiklian and Minister for Police and Emergency Services David Elliott announced the creation of a NSW Premier's Bushfire Emergency Citation in formal recognition of their efforts.

== Criteria ==
The NSW Premier's Bushfire Emergency Citation is awarded to the personnel of relevant agencies for service of one day or more during the fire season.

== Description ==
Awarded alongside a letter from the Premier, and a certificate co-signed by Shane Fitzsimmons – the citation consists of a rectangular silver framed navy-blue bar, inscribed with the years of the season, and featuring both a red stripe to signify the bushfire event, and the Waratah State Flower.

== Order of Wear ==
Awarded by the Government of New South Wales, the Citation is independent of the Australian honours and awards system, and to be worn on the right-hand side separately from Federal awards and decorations such as the National Emergency Medal.

== See also ==
- National Emergency Medal with the BUSHFIRES 19–20 clasp.
