= Police Overseas Service Medal =

Australian campaign medal

- Medal and ribbon
- Type: Medal
- Awarded for: service with international peace-keeping organisations; service following requests for assistance from foreign governments
- Presented by: Australia
- Eligibility: officers of Australian police forces
- Clasps: 13 at 8 January 2014
- Status: Currently awarded
- Established: 25 April 1991

Highlights
- Total: 6,640

Order of Wear
- Next (higher): Various Campaign Medals
- Next (lower): Humanitarian Overseas Service Medal
- Related: Australian Service Medal

The Police Overseas Service Medal is an award in the Australian honours system. The award is presented to members of an Australian police force in recognition of service undertaken with an international peace-keeping organisations or following a request for assistance from a foreign government. The award was introduced by letters patent on 25 April 1991. In 2013 the criteria were amended to also include service by regular and patrol officers of the Royal Papua New Guinea Constabulary. Recipients of the medal are not entitled to any post-nominal letters.

== Description ==
The Police Overseas Service Medal features a globe of the world surmounted by a branch of wattle, which is Australia's national floral emblem. The globe is centred on Cyprus, the first international deployment of Australian police. The rim of the medal is a chequerboard pattern, which symbolises police forces across the world. The circular, nickel-silver medal is ensigned with the Crown of St Edward. The back of the medal displays a Federation Star. The words 'Police Overseas Service Medal' are inscribed around the rim. The 32 mm-wide ribbon consists of alternating squares of black and white in the chequerboard pattern commonly representative of police services.

== Clasps ==
Nineteen clasps have been declared for the Police Overseas Service Medal as of 2022. These are:

Clasp	Start Date	End Date (if declared)	Service Criteria
AFGHANISTAN	1 October 2007		90 days service as part of capacity-building in Afghanistan.
BOUGAINVILLE	20 November 1997		30 days service with the International Truce Monitoring Group in Bougainville.
CAMBODIA	18 May 1992		90 days service with the United Nations Transitional Authority in Cambodia (UNTAC).
CYPRUS	1 May 1964		90 days service with the United Nations Peacekeeping Force in Cyprus (UNFICYP).
EAST TIMOR	1 June 1999	20 May 2005	30 days service with the United Nations Mission in East Timor (UNAMET) or the United Nations Mission of Support to East Timor (UNMISET).
HAITI	10 October 1994		90 days service with the United Nations Mission in Haiti (UNMIH).
MOZAMBIQUE	24 March 1994		90 days service with the United Nations Operations in Mozambique (UNOMOZ).
NPFPCP	1 November 2004		30 days service as part of the Nauru Police Force Police Capacity Program (NPFPCP).
PNGAPP	23 April 2008		90 days service as part of the Papua New Guinea Australia Policing Partnership (PNGAPP).
PNGECP	1 July 2004	13 May 2005	90 days service as part of the Papua New Guinea Enhanced Cooperation Program (PNGECP).
RAMSI	21 July 2003		30 days service with the Regional Assistance Mission to Solomon Islands (RAMSI).
SIPDP	1 July 2017		30 days service as part of the Solomon Islands Police Development Program (SIPDP).
SOLOMON ISLANDS	8 November 2000		30 days service with the International Peace Monitoring Team in the Solomon Islands.
SOMALIA	1 November 1993		90 days service with the United Nations Operation in Somalia II (UNOSOM II).
SOUTH SUDAN	9 July 2011		90 days service with the United Nations Mission in South Sudan (UNMISS).
SUDAN	9 March 2006		30 days service with the United Nations Mission in Sudan (UNMIS).
TIMOR LESTE	20 May 2005		30 days service with the United Nations Office in East Timor (UNOTIL).
TLPDP	1 July 2004		90 days service as part of the Timor Leste Police Development Program (TLPDP).
TPNG	1 July 1949	30 November 1973	30 days service as part of the overseas capacity-building in the Territory of Papua and New Guinea (TPNG) or service with the Royal Papua and New Guinea Constabulary (RPNGC).

== See also ==
- Australian Honours Order of Precedence
