= National Police Service Medal =

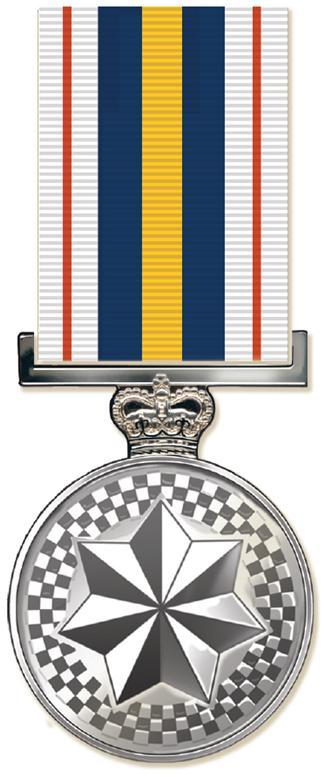
- Medal and Ribbon
- Type: Service in the Office of Constable
- Awarded for: 15 years "ethical and diligent service" on or after 14 February 1975, or for a lesser period if that service was terminated due to the member's death, or to an impairment related to the discharge of their duties as a Constable of Police
- Presented by: Commonwealth of Australia
- Eligibility: Sworn members of all Australian police forces
- Post-nominals: (no post-nominal entitlement)
- Clasps: None
- Status: Currently Issued
- Established: 9 November 2010
- First award: 19 September 2011

Highlights
- Total: 56,725

Precedence
- Next (higher): Civilian Service Medal 1939–1945
- Next (lower): Polar Medal

The National Police Service Medal (NPSM) is a special service award within the Australian honours system to provide "recognition for the unique contribution and significant commitment of those persons who have given ethical and diligent service as a sworn member of an Australian police service".

The NPSM is awarded for "15 years 'ethical and diligent service' on or after 14 February 1975, or for a lesser period if that service was terminated due to the member's death, or to an impairment related to the discharge of their duties as a Constable of Police".

Australian police continue to receive the National Medal to recognise their long service. Thus, at the completion of 15 years 'ethical and diligent service', a police officer may receive both the National Police Service Medal and the National Medal.

== Background ==
The Australian Government announced that Her Majesty had given in-principle approval on Thursday 30 October 2008 for the introduction of a new award in the Australian honours and award system to recognise the special contribution made to the Australian community by police. The medal is only awarded once; there are no clasps awarded for additional periods of service.

The National Police Service Medal is not an award to recognise long service. Rather, it acknowledges the ethical and diligent commitment, and the unique contribution to the community, demonstrated by sworn members of Australia’s police forces. In most Australian police forces, long and diligent service has been recognised since May 1956 with the award of the Police Long Service and Good Conduct Medal. Since the introduction of the Australian honours system on 14 February 1975, service has been recognised by award of the National Medal.

It was estimated that over 20,000 former Australian police would be eligible for the award upon its introduction.

The medal sets an uncommonly high standard for its award and retention. Although a police officer may qualify for the award and be presented with same, should their service be later found to be unethical or not diligent, in an act either before or after the NPSM was awarded to them, then the award may be cancelled at any time on the advice of their Commissioner of Police.

The award came about as a result of the lobbying of various individuals and professional bodies, but principally by the Police Federation of Australia.

== Description ==
The National Police Service Medal is 38 millimetres in diameter and 3.5 millimetres in depth. It is finished in cupro nickel with the St Edward’s Crown located on the suspender bar.

The obverse (front) of the medal features the Federation Star representing the Commonwealth of Australia. The Federation Star is located inside a circular chequered band, known as the Sillitoe tartan, which is an internationally recognised symbol of Police. The chequered band is unbroken and surrounds the star. This design signifies the unity and cooperation between each of the individual state, federal and territory police forces, which thereby join together as a shield to protect the entire Commonwealth.

The reverse (back) of the medal has two sprays of golden wattle, (Acacia pycnantha Australia’s national floral emblem), located immediately below a horizontal panel 25 millimetres across and 8 millimetres high. The panel is centrally located and used to record the recipient’s details. The words: ‘FOR SERVICE AS AN AUSTRALIAN POLICE OFFICER’ in capital letters appear around the inside of the outer rim.

The medal ribbon draws inspiration from police awards under both the Imperial and Australian systems, including the Police Long Service and Good Conduct Medal, the Australian Police Medal, and the King’s/Queen’s Police Medal for Gallantry. The ribbon is 32 millimetres wide and has a central yellow gold stripe 5 millimetres wide, flanked by navy blue stripes 5.5 millimetres wide, flanked by white stripes 3.5 millimetres wide, flanked by crimson red stripes 1 millimetre wide, flanked by white stripes 3.5 millimetres wide. The blue and gold are Australia's heraldic colours, defining this as an Australian award, while the blue and white are colours traditionally associated with police and police awards. The thin red stripes represent the ever-present hazards experienced in service as an Australian police officer.

The medal device of the National Police Service Medal has been designed by Inspector Rick Steinborn of the New South Wales Police Force (NSWPF) and the ribbon was developed by Detective Senior Constable James Cheshire of the Australian Federal Police (AFP).

== Order of Wear ==
In Australia the position of medals when worn is defined by the Order of Wearing. The NPSM appears immediately after the Civilian Service Medal 1939-1945, before all long service awards. This is in recognition that the medal is not a long service award, and is made only to sworn police officers who have provided ethical and diligent service for the entirety of their police career.

== See also ==
- Australian Honours System
- Australian Honours Order of Precedence
- National Medal (Australia)
