= Police Long Service and Good Conduct Medal =

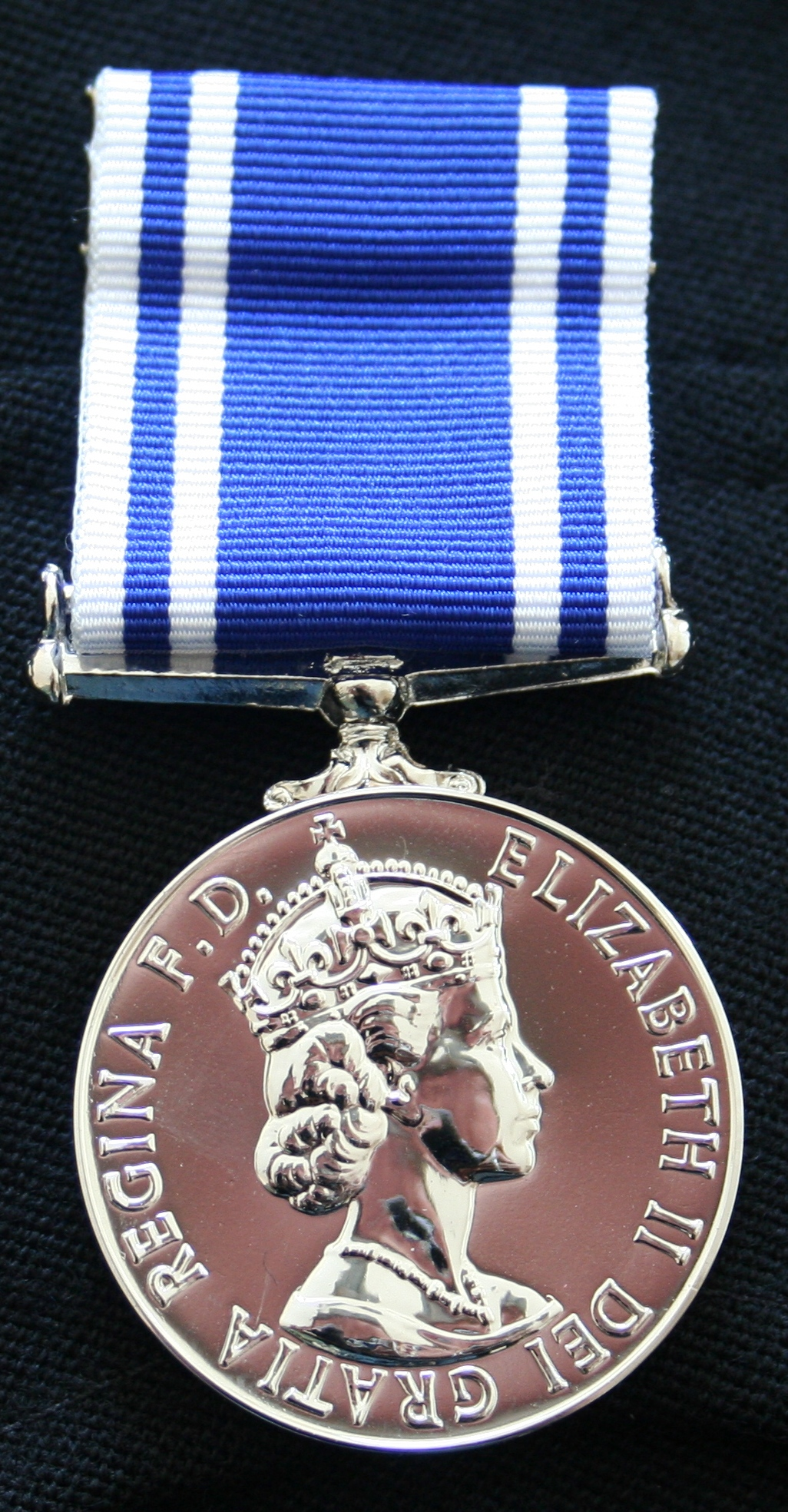
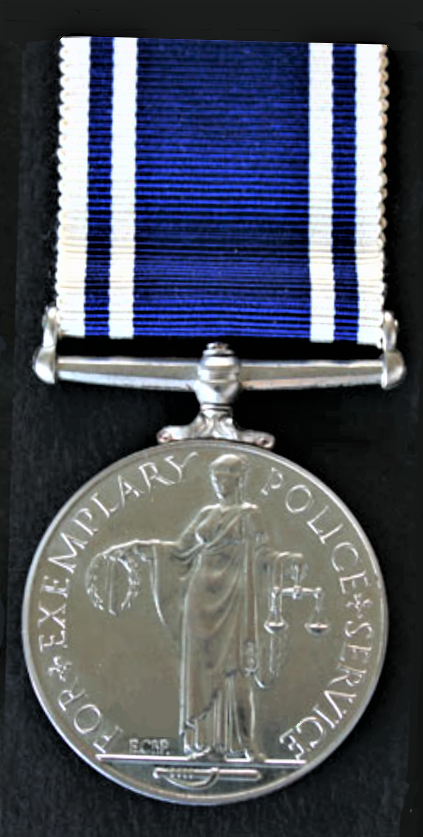
- Obverse and reverse of the medal
- Type: Long service medal
- Awarded for: 20 years of service
- Presented by: the United Kingdom
- Eligibility: 20 years full or part time service as a Police Officer
- Clasps: 30 and 40 Years Service Clasp
- Status: Currently awarded
- Established: 14 June 1951

Highlights
- Total: 55,000 (to February 2022)
- Ribbon bar of the medal

Order of Wear
- Next (higher): Indian Meritorious Service Medal (British Indian Army)
- Next (lower): Fire and Rescue Service Long Service and Good Conduct Medal

The Police Long Service and Good Conduct Medal is a decoration for police officers of the United Kingdom. First instituted in 1951, the medal is presented for twenty aggregate years of service in the police services of the United Kingdom.

== Criteria ==
The Police Long Service and Good Conduct Medal was instituted under Royal Warrant by King George VI in June 1951 and is awarded as a mark of the Sovereign's appreciation of long and meritorious service rendered by members of the Police Forces of the United Kingdom. For an officer to become eligible for this award the Chief Constable must make a recommendation to the Home Secretary, and in doing so, is required to certify the following:

1. That an officer has been a serving member of a Police Force.
2. That the officer has served efficiently for the qualifying period.
3. That the officer's character has been very good.

=== Commonwealth ===
In 1956 eligibility was extended to police officers serving in Australia, Papua New Guinea and Nauru. In 1976 Australia replaced the award with the National Medal and, in 2010, with the National Police Service Medal.

=== Length of service ===
The initial award criterion was 22 years' service as a full-time regular police officer within any Constabulary.

Later, Long Service and Good Conduct Medals were introduced for the Fire Brigade and Ambulance Service, both awarded for 20 years’ service. A national campaign to award the police medal after 20 years, and so bring it in line with the other emergency services, was started by Warwickshire Police Officer Kenneth Fowler, supported by Chief Officers, the Police Federations and Members of Parliament. On 19 January 2010, Queen Elizabeth II amended the medal's royal warrant to make the qualifying period of service 20 years.

=== Clasps ===
In March 2022, the Royal Warrant was updated by Queen Elizabeth II to grant clasps to officers who completed a further 10 and 20 years of long service post award of the medal. This change reflected the longer service of Police Officers following pension changes and sought to recognise their extended service. The two clasps are in cupronickel, and bear the inscription below:

- 'Long Service, 30 Years'
- 'Long Service, 40 Years'

== Appearance ==
The medal is circular, 1.4 inches (36 mm) in diameter and initially issued in cupro-nickel, with modern strikings being rhodium plated. It has the following design:

- The obverse bears the effigy of the reigning monarch
- The reverse has the figure of Justice with scales in her left hand and a wreath in her right surrounded by the inscription 'FOR EXEMPLARY POLICE SERVICE'.
- The suspender is straight and found in both swivelling and non-swivelling formats.
- It is engraved on the rim in impressed capital letters, with the recipients rank and name. As of circa 2006 officers from the four Welsh constabularies have the option to have their rank engraved in Welsh.
- It hangs from a dark blue ribbon, 1.25 inches (32 mm) wide, with two thin white stripes towards each edge.
- Bars for additional service of 30 and 40 years, were authorised on 11 March 2022. However officers had to be serving on this date, the award is not retrospective to officers who retired prior to this date.

=== Obverse variations ===
The medal has been awarded with one of four obverse designs:

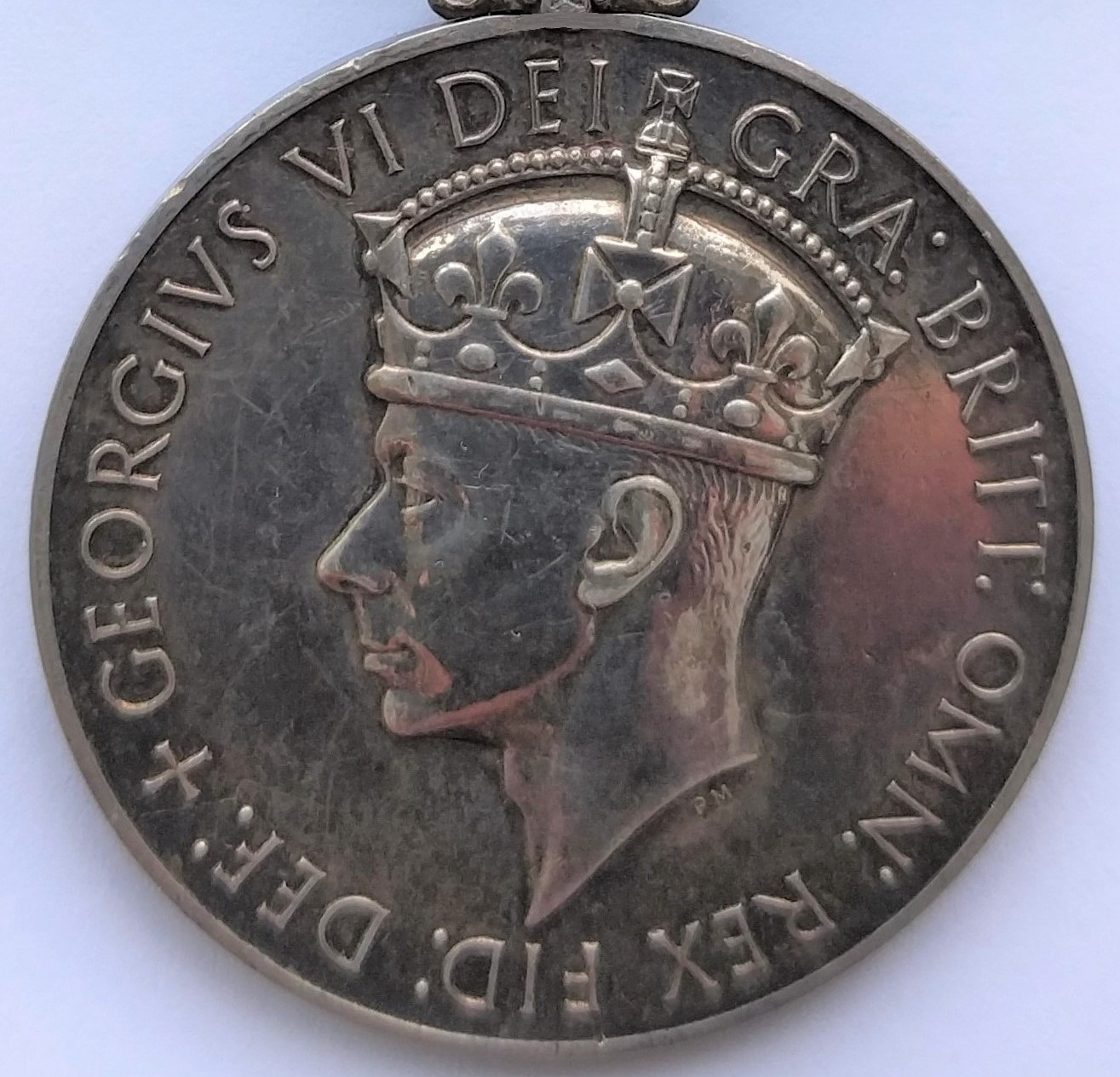
George VI (1951–53)

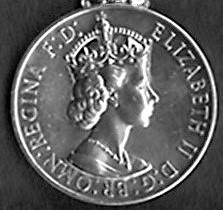
Elizabeth II 'BR OMN' (1953 to mid-1950s)

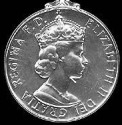
Elizabeth II 'DEI GRATIA' (Mid-1950s to 2022)

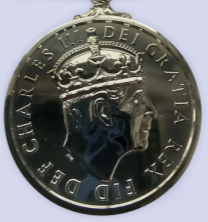
Charles III (Since 2023)

== See also ==
- King's Police Medal
- Special Constabulary Long Service Medal
