= List of recipients of the Distinguished Service Cross (Australia) =

This is a list of recipients of the Distinguished Service Cross military decoration awarded to personnel of the Australian Defence Force. It is awarded for distinguished command and leadership in action. The DSC was introduced in 1991 and is the highest distinguished service decoration in the Australian Honours System. Recipients of the Distinguished Service Cross are entitled to use the post-nominal letters "DSC". Since its inception 87 awards have been made—which includes six Bars—with the most recent being announced in the 2018 Queen's Birthday Honour's List.

Name	Citation	Awarded	Notes
A	For distinguished command and leadership in warlike operations as the Commanding Officer of the Special Operations Task Group 632 Rotation IV during Operation OKRA in Iraq during 2016.	2017 Q	
Michael Birtles	For distinguished command and leadership in the conduct of warlike operations as the Commander of the Security Detachment, Baghdad, Iraq during Operations FALCONER and CATALYST.	2004 Q	
Jason Blain, CSC	For distinguished command and leadership in action as the Commanding Officer, the 1st Mentoring Task Force, and Deputy Commander, Combined Team Uruzgan, on Operation SLIPPER in Afghanistan from January to October 2010.	2012 A	
Rick Burr			
C	For distinguished command and leadership in action.	2012 A	
John Caligari, AM	For distinguished command and leadership in action.	2012 A	
Angus Campbell, AM	For distinguished command and leadership in action as Commander Joint Task Force 633 on Operation SLIPPER from January 2011 to December 2011.	2012 Q	
John Cantwell, AO	For distinguished command and leadership in action as the Commander Joint Task Force 633 on Operations SLIPPER and KRUGER.	2012 A	
Peter Connolly	For distinguished command and leadership in action while Commanding Officer, Mentoring and Reconstruction Task Force 2, on Operation SLIPPER in Afghanistan from June to December 2009.	2011 A	
Michael Crane, AM	For distinguished service in command and leadership in the Middle East Area of Operations as the Commander Joint Task Force 633 for Operations CATALYST and SLIPPER.	2008 A	
Michael Crane, DSC AM	For distinguished command and leadership in warlike operations as the Commander of Joint Task Force 633 on Operation SLIPPER from October 2012 to September 2013	2014 Q	
Campbell Darby, AM	For distinguished command and leadership in action as the Commander Joint Task Force 633 and the Australian National Headquarters Middle East Area of Operations during Operation CATALYST, November 2003 to May 2004.	2005 A	
Stephen Day	For distinguished command and leadership of the 3rd Combat Engineer Regiment during the deployment and operational phases of Operation WARDEN.	25 Mar 2000	
D, DSC	For distinguished command and leadership in warlike operations on Operation SLIPPER	2016 A	Bar
Justin Ellwood	For distinguished command and leadership in action as the Commander of Rotation Three of the Overwatch Battle Group - West during Operation CATALYST.	2009 A	
Gregory Evans, AM	For distinguished service in command and leadership in the Middle East Area of Operations as the Commander Joint Task Force 633 during Operation CATALYST.	2006 A	
Mark Evans, AM	For distinguished command and leadership as the Commander of the 3rd Brigade during Operation WARDEN in East Timor.	25 Mar 2000	
Kahlil Fegan	For distinguished command and leadership in warlike operations and in action as the Commanding Officer, Mentoring Task Force 4 on Operation SLIPPER in Afghanistan from January to June 2012.	2013 Q	
F, DSC	For distinguished command and leadership in warlike operations during Operation SLIPPER.	2015 A	Bar
G	For distinguished command and leadership in action in Afghanistan in 2008.	2010 A	
G	For distinguished command and leadership in action on Operation SLIPPER in Afghanistan.	2012 Q	
G	For distinguished command and leadership in action.	2013 A	
G	For distinguished command and leadership in warlike operations in Iraq in 2015.	2017 A	
Shane Gabriel	For distinguished command and leadership in action while Commanding Officer, Mentoring and Reconstruction Task Force 1 in Afghanistan from October 2008 to June 2009.	2010 A	
Matthew Jeremy Galton	For distinguished command and leadership in warlike operations as the Commander Task Group Taji in Iraq in 2015.	2017 A	
Ken Gillespie, AM, CSM	For distinguished command and leadership as the Commander Sector West while deployed on active service with the United Nations Transitional Administration East Timor during Operation TANAGER.	2002 Q	
Gus Gillmore			
John Gould	For distinguished command and leadership as Commander of the Special Operations Task Group during Operation SLIPPER Rotation Two.	2007 Q	
Mike Hindmarsh, AO, CSC	For distinguished command and leadership in action in the Middle East Area of Operations as the Commander Joint Task Force 633 for Operations CATALYST and SLIPPER.	2009 Q	
Mel Hupfeld	For distinguished command and leadership in action as the Commanding Officer of Number 75 Squadron during Operation FALCONER.	27 Nov 2003	
David Hurley		26 Nov 1993	
Peter Hutchinson	For distinguished command and leadership in the Middle East Area of Operations as the Commander, Joint Task Force 633 during Operation CATALYST.	2005 Q	
Darren Huxley	For distinguished command and leadership in action as Commanding Officer, Mentoring Task Force - Two on Operation SLIPPER in Afghanistan.	2012 Q	
I, DSC	For distinguished command and leadership in warlike operations as Commanding Officer of Special Operations Task Group on Operation SLIPPER.	2014 A	
I, DSC	For distinguished leadership in warlike operations as part of a Special Operations Force on Operation OKRA from September 2014 to February 2015.	2016 A	2nd Bar
Timothy Charles Innes, CSC	For distinguished command and leadership in warlike operations as the Commander Joint Task Force 633 on Operations OKRA and HIGHROAD from January 2016 to January 2017.	2018 Q	
J	For distinguished command and leadership in action on Operation SLIPPER in Afghanistan.	2011 Q	
J	For distinguished command and leadership in warlike operations and in action as the Commanding Officer, Special Operations Task Group on Operation SLIPPER in Afghanistan.	2013 Q	
Harold Jarvie, CSC	For distinguished command and leadership in action as the Commanding Officer of 2nd Reconstruction Task Force in Afghanistan.	2008 Q	
Mark Jennings	For distinguished command and leadership in action as the Commander Officer, the 1st Mentoring Task Force on Operation SLIPPER in Afghanistan from May to October 2010.	2012 A	
Peter Jones, AM	For distinguished command and leadership as the Commander of Task Group 633.1 and the Coalition Maritime Interception Force during Operation FALCONER.	27 Nov 2003	
Trevor Jones, AO CSC RAN	For distinguished command and leadership in warlike operations as the Commander Joint Task Force 633 while deployed to the Middle East Region from November 2014 to January 2016.	2017 A	
K	For distinguished command and leadership in warlike operations as an Officer Commanding with the Special Operations Task Group on Operation SLIPPER.	2014 A	
Gavin Michael Keating, CSC	For distinguished command and leadership in warlike operations as the Commander Task Group Taji Two on Operation OKRA in Iraq.	2017 Q	
Mark Kelly, AO	For distinguished command and leadership in action in the Middle East Area of Operations as the Commander Joint Task Force 633 for Operations CATALYST, SLIPPER and KRUGER from January 2009 to January 2010.	2011 A	
Vance Khan	For distinguished command and leadership in action while the Officer Commanding 3rd Special Air Service Squadron in Afghanistan during Operation SLIPPER.	2003 Q	
Geoffrey Ledger, AM	For distinguished command and leadership in action in the Middle East Area of Operations as the Commander Joint Task Force 633 during Operations CATALYST and SLIPPER.	2007 A	
Duncan Lewis, CSC		2001 Q	
Peter Lockwood, CSC	For distinguished command and leadership as the Commanding Officer of HMAS ANZAC, and for the execution of significant Naval Gunfire Support missions during Operation FALCONER.	27 Nov 2003	
M	For distinguished command and leadership in action in Afghanistan in 2008.	2010 A	
Michael Mahy	For distinguished command and leadership in action as Commanding Officer of Al Muthanna Task Group Three and Operational Overwatch Battle Group West.	2008 A	
Daniel McDaniel			
Tim McOwan			
William Mellor, AM		26 Nov 1993	
Jim Molan, AO	For distinguished service in command and leadership in action while serving as Deputy Chief of Staff for Strategic Operations and Deputy Chief of Staff Civil Military Operations with Multi-National Force - Iraq from April 2004 to April 2005, during Operation CATALYST.	2006 A	
Michael Moon		2001 Q	
David Thomas Mulhall, AM CSC	For distinguished command and leadership in warlike operations as Commander Joint Task Force 636 and Deputy Chief of Staff Support Headquarters International Security Assistance Force and Headquarters Resolute Support on Operations SLIPPER and HIGHROAD from May 2014 until May 2015.	2016 Q	
Roger Noble	For distinguished command and leadership while employed as Commanding Officer for the Al Muthanna Task Group in Southern Iraq during the period 24 April 2005 to 25	2006 Q	
N, DSC	For distinguished command and leadership in warlike operations as the Commanding Officer of Special Operations Task Group 632 on Operation OKRA.	2018 A	Bar
N	For distinguished command and leadership in warlike operations as the Commanding Officer of Special Operations Task Group 632 on Operation OKRA from November 2016 to June 2017.	2018 Q	
Craig William Orme, AM CSC	For distinguished command and leadership in warlike operations as Commander Joint Task Force 633 on Operations SLIPPER and OKRA from September 2013 to December 2014.	2016 A	
P	For distinguished command and leadership in action in Afghanistan, 2008.	2010 A	
P, DSC	For distinguished command and leadership in action.	2012 A	
P	For distinguished command and leadership in warlike operations in Iraq in 2015.	2017 A	
Steven Peter Roberton	For distinguished command and leadership in warlike operations as the inaugural Commander Air Task Group 630 on Operation OKRA from September 2014 until January 2015.	2016 A	
John William Shanahan, AM OBE	For distinguished command and leadership in warlike operations as the Commander of the 205th Corps Advisory Team on Operation SLIPPER from September 2012 to August 2013.	2014 Q	
Michael Slater			
Stuart Smith, AM	For distinguished command and leadership in warlike operations as Commander Joint Task Force 633 on Operation SLIPPER from January to October 2012.	2013 Q	
Wade Bradley Stothart, AM	For distinguished command and leadership in warlike operations as Commander of Combined Team-Uruzgan, during Operation SLIPPER from July 2013 to December 2013.	2015 A	
Simon Andrew Stuart, AM	For distinguished command and leadership in warlike operations as the Commander Combined Team Uruzgan on Operation SLIPPER from October 2012 to August 2013.	2014 Q	
S	For distinguished command and leadership in warlike operations in Iraq.	2017 A	
S	For distinguished command and leadership during Operation OKRA from September 2014 until April 2015.	2017 Q	
S	For distinguished command and leadership in warlike operations as Commander Air Task Group 630 in Iraq from July 2015 to January 2016.	2017 A	
Richard Anthony Vagg	For distinguished command and leadership in warlike operations as the Commander of Task Group Taji IV in Iraq on Operation OKRA, from December 2016 to June 2017.	2018 Q	
Malcolm Dalziel Wells	For distinguished command and leadership in warlike operations as the Commanding Officer of the 7th Battalion, the Royal Australian Regiment Task Group on Operation SLIPPER from November 2012 to June 2013.	2014 Q	

== See also ==
- Australian Honours System
- Defence Honours and Awards scandal
