= List of Australian Defence Force casualties in Afghanistan =

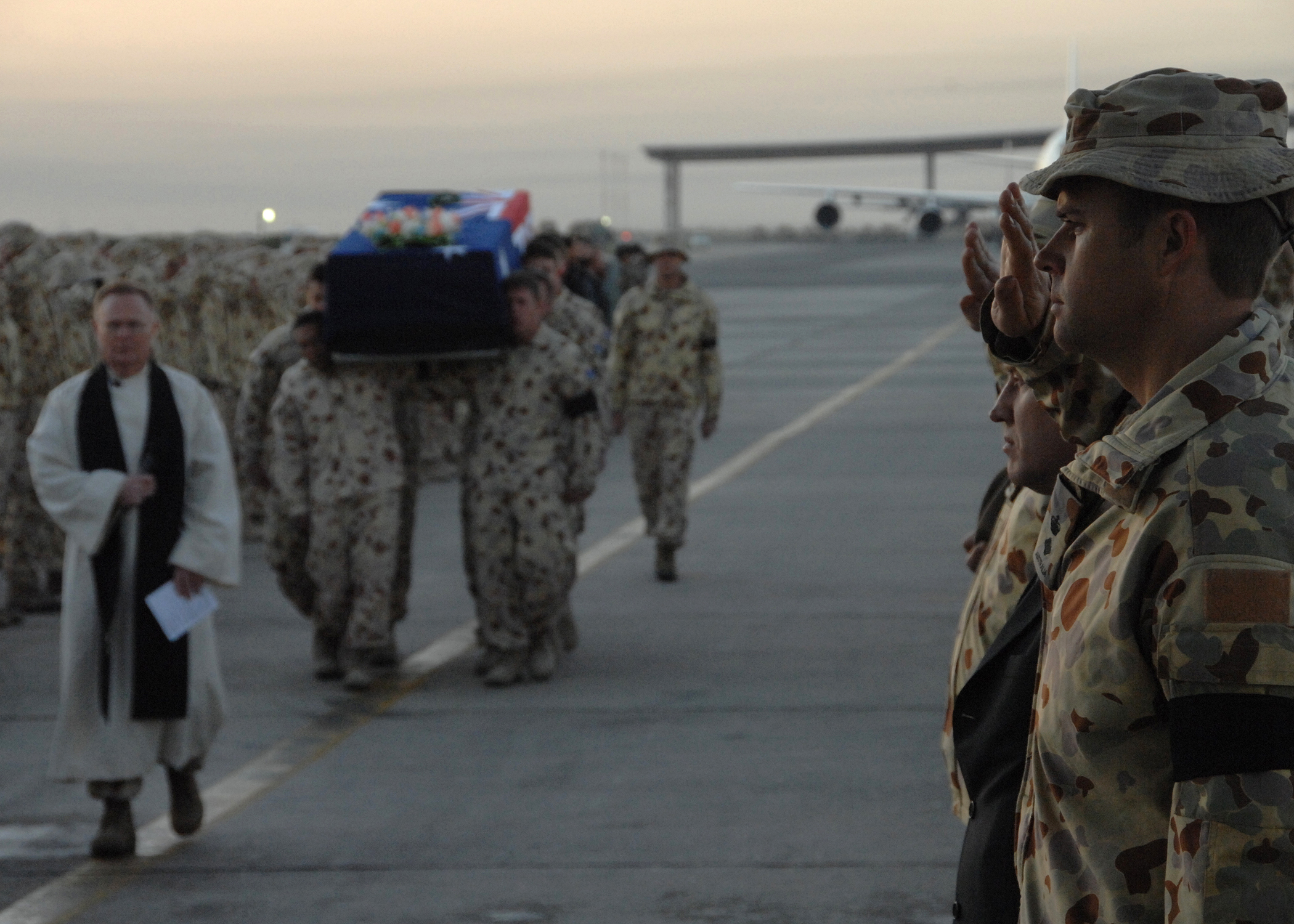
The repatriation ceremony held for Private Sher on 7 January 2009

Operation Slipper included the first Australian combat deaths since the Vietnam War, and to date all casualties have occurred during operations in Afghanistan. 41 Australian soldiers have been killed (34 as a result of enemy action) and 261 wounded (including two sailors and one airman), the majority since October 2007. Another Australian was killed while serving with the British Army. (Note: Stuart Nash, 21, was a Rifleman in The Rifles regiment, British Army. Nash was born in Sydney and was killed in action in Nad e Ali District, Helmand province on 17 December 2008. He is not counted in the list of Australian casualties above. See "Rifleman Stuart Nash killed in Afghanistan". mod.uk. 18 December 2008. Archived from the original on 22 April 2009.)

== Deaths ==
1. Andrew Russell, 33, a sergeant in the Special Air Service Regiment (SASR). On 16 February 2002, Russell was travelling through southern Afghanistan with four other Australian soldiers when their Long Range Patrol Vehicle struck a land mine, severely injuring him. He was taken to a US military hospital, where he succumbed to his wounds.
2. David Pearce, 41, a trooper from the 2nd/14th Light Horse Regiment, serving with RTF-3, was killed while serving in Orūzgān Province on 8 October 2007.
3. Matthew Locke MG, 33, a sergeant in the Special Air Service Regiment. On 25 October 2007, Locke, who was serving a second tour of duty in Afghanistan, was engaged in a firefight with members of the Taliban militia, when he was injured in the chest by small arms fire. Other soldiers in his unit provided first-aid care prior to and during evacuation to a medical facility, where he died a short time later. Gurkha Lance Corporal Agnish Thapa, serving in the 1st Royal Gurkha Rifles, British Army was awarded the Military Cross for running 100 metres (110 yd) through enemy machine gun and RPG fire and extracted Locke by physically dragging him back to cover. Locke was killed while serving in Orūzgān Province. During his first tour of duty, Locke had been awarded the Medal for Gallantry.
4. Luke Worsley, 26, a private in the 4th Battalion, Royal Australian Regiment (Commando), serving with Special Operations Task Group. He was shot and killed by small arms fire on 23 November 2007 during an attempt to take a heavily defended Taliban position.
5. Jason Marks, 27, a lance corporal in the 4th Battalion, Royal Australian Regiment (Commando). He was killed after an intense firefight with Taliban insurgents on 27 April 2008, when a RPG landed near the patrol vehicle he was taking cover behind whilst reloading his weapon. The attack occurred 25 kilometres (16 mi) south of the Australian base at Tarin Kowt in Orūzgān Province. Four other Australian soldiers were wounded in the attack. All five were flown to a nearby US military hospital, where the wounded were expected to fully recover.
6. Sean McCarthy, 25, a signalman in the Special Air Service Regiment. He, two other SASR soldiers and a soldier from another country were wounded when the vehicle they were travelling in was attacked by a roadside bomb on 8 July 2008 during a patol in Orūzgān Province. McCarthy died from his wounds after being evacuated to the SOTG's base at Tarin Kowt. He was on his 2nd tour of duty in Afghanistan. The two other Australians wounded in the attack returned to duty on 11 July.
7. Michael Fussell, 25, a lieutenant in the 4th Battalion, Royal Australian Regiment (Commando). As he and his team were conducting a dismounted patrol on 27 November 2008 they were struck by an improvised explosive device (IED), killing Fussell. Two other soldiers received minor wounds, but returned to duty a few days later.
8. Gregory Michael Sher, 30, a private in the 1st Commando Regiment, Australian Special Operations Command was killed by a rocket attack in Uruzgan province, on 4 January 2009.
9. Mathew Hopkins, 21, a corporal in the 7th Battalion, Royal Australian Regiment. He was attacked and fatally injured on 16 March 2009 while on patrol as part of a mentoring and reconstruction taskforce patrol operating with members of the Afghan National Army, near a village 12 kilometres (7.5 mi) north of Tarin Kowt.
10. Brett Till, 31, a sergeant and explosive ordnance disposal (EOD) technician from the Incident Response Regiment. He was killed on 19 March 2009 while trying to defuse an IED.
11. Benjamin Ranaudo, 22, a private in the 1st Battalion, Royal Australian Regiment, serving with MRTF 2. He was killed on 18 July 2009 by an anti-personnel explosive device during an operation against a compound of interest in the Baluchi Valley.
12. Jacob Moerland, 21, a sapper in the 2nd Combat Engineer Regiment, serving with MTF 1. He was killed on 7 June 2010 by an improvised explosive device while participating in an Australian patrol conducting operations in the Miribad Valley region of Oruzgan province.
13. Darren Smith, 25, a sapper in the 2nd Combat Engineer Regiment, serving with MTF 1. He was injured on 7 June 2010 by an improvised explosive device in the same incident as Moerland while participating in an Australian patrol conducting operations in the Miribad Valley region of Oruzgan province. He subsequently died of wounds after being evacuated to an International Security Assistance Force hospital. Also killed was his explosives detection dog Herbie.
14. Scott Palmer, 27, a private in the 2nd Commando Regiment, serving with SOTG. He was killed in the crash of a US UH-60 Blackhawk helicopter on 21 June 2010, during operations in the Shah Wali Kot.
15. Timothy Aplin, 38, a private in the 2nd Commando Regiment, serving with SOTG. He was killed in the crash of a US UH-60 Blackhawk helicopter on 21 June 2010, during operations in the Shah Wali Kot.
16. Benjamin Chuck, 27, a private in the 2nd Commando Regiment, serving with SOTG. He subsequently died of his injuries following the crash of a US UH-60 Blackhawk helicopter on 21 June 2010, during operations in the Shah Wali Kot.
17. Nathan Bewes, 23, a private in the 6th Battalion, Royal Australian Regiment (6 RAR), serving with MTF 1. Private Bewes was killed and another wounded following an improvised explosive device on 9 July 2010 in the Chora Valley region.
18. Jason Brown, 29, a trooper in the Special Air Service Regiment. Brown was shot and killed on 13 August 2010 during a "disruption operation" in northern Kandahar.
19. Grant Kirby, 35, a private in the 6th Battalion, Royal Australian Regiment, serving with MTF 1. Private Kirby was killed by an Improvised Explosive Device after dismounting from a Bushmaster PMV in an overwatch position during an operation in the Baluchi Valley on 20 August 2010.
20. Tomas Dale, 21, a private in the 6th Battalion, Royal Australian Regiment, serving with MTF 1. Private Dale was killed by an Improvised Explosive Device after dismounting from a Bushmaster PMV in an overwatch position during an operation in the Baluchi Valley on 20 August 2010.
21. Jared MacKinney , 28, a lance corporal in the 6th Battalion, Royal Australian Regiment, serving with MTF 1. Lance Corporal MacKinney was shot and killed in Deh Rahwod, in the western part of Orūzgān Province, during the Battle of Derapet on 24 August 2010.
22. Richard Atkinson, 22, a corporal in the 1st Combat Engineer Regiment, serving with MTF 2. Corporal Atkinson was killed by an improvised bomb in the Tangi Valley, southern Uruzgan province on 2 February 2011.
23. Jamie Larcombe, 21, a sapper in the 1st Combat Engineer Regiment, serving with MTF 2. Sapper Larcombe and an Afghan man employed as an interpreter were shot in the Mirabad Region on 19 February 2011.
24. Brett Wood MG, DSM, 32, a sergeant in the 2nd Commando Regiment, serving with the SOTG. Wood was killed by an improvised explosive device on 23 May 2011, during his third tour of duty in Afghanistan.
25. Andrew Jones, 25, a lance corporal in the 9th Force Support Battalion, was shot by a member of the Afghan National Army on his way to guard duty at a patrol base in the Chora Valley on 30 May 2011.
26. Marcus Sean Case, 27, a lieutenant in the 6th Aviation Regiment. Case was killed when an Australian Chinook helicopter crashed east of Tarin Kowt during a re-supply mission in Zabul Province on 30 May 2011. This was Case's first deployment to Afghanistan.
27. Rowan Robinson, 23, a sapper in the Sydney-based Incident Response Regiment serving with SOTG. Robinson was killed in action on 6 June 2011 during his second deployment to Afghanistan.
28. Todd Langley, 35, a sergeant in the Sydney-based 2nd Commando Regiment, serving with SOTG. Langley was shot and killed on 4 July 2011 during his fifth deployment to Afghanistan.
29. Matthew Lambert, 26, a private in the Townsville-based 2nd Battalion, Royal Australian Regiment (2 RAR), serving with MTF 3. Lambert was killed by an improvised explosive device (IED) in the Khaz Oruzgan region on 22 August 2011. It was his first deployment to Afghanistan.
30. Bryce Duffy, 26, a captain in the 4th Regiment, Royal Australian Artillery, serving with MTF 3 was shot and killed by a member of the Afghan National Army on 29 October 2011.
31. Ashley Birt, 22, a corporal serving as a Geospatial Technician in the 6th Engineer Support Regiment. Birt was shot and killed by a member of the Afghan National Army on 29 October 2011.
32. Luke Gavin, 27, a lance corporal from 2 RAR, serving with MTF 3 was shot and killed by a member of the Afghan National Army on 29 October 2011.
33. Blaine Diddams MG, 40, a sergeant in the Special Air Service Regiment serving with the SOTG was shot and killed during an engagement with insurgents on 2 July 2012.
34. Nathanael John Aubrey Galagher, 23, a private serving with the Special Operations Task Group was killed in a helicopter crash on 30 August 2012.
35. Mervyn John McDonald, 30, a lance corporal serving with the Special Operations Task Group was killed in a helicopter crash on 30 August 2012.
36. Stjepan Milosevic, 40, a lance corporal from 2nd/14th Light Horse Regiment serving with the 3rd Battalion, Royal Australian Regiment TG (3 RAR TG) was shot and killed by a member of the Afghan National Army on 30 August 2012.
37. Robert Hugh Frederick Poate, 23, a private from 6 RAR serving with the 3 RAR Task Group was shot and killed by a member of the Afghan National Army on 30 August 2012.
38. James Thomas Martin, 21, a sapper from the 2nd Combat Engineer Regiment (2 CER) serving with the 3 RAR Task Group was shot and killed by a member of the Afghan National Army on 30 August 2012.
39. Scott James Smith, 24, a corporal from the Special Operations Engineer Regiment, serving with the Special Operations Task Group, was killed in an IED explosion on 21 October 2012.
40. Cameron Stewart Baird VC, MG, 32, a corporal from 2nd Commando Regiment serving with the Special Operations Task Group, killed in small arms fire engagement on 22 June 2013. Baird was awarded the Medal for Gallantry in 2007 and a posthumous Victoria Cross in 2014.
41. Todd John Chidgey, 29, a lance corporal from the 2nd Commando Regiment attached to Australian Defence Force Headquarters Kabul, died from a non-combat-related gunshot wound on 1 July 2014.

== Notes ==
Footnotes

Citations
