= Mike Hindmarsh =

Australian military officer (born 1956)

- Born: 20 August 1956 (age 70); Kilcoy, Queensland, Australia
- Military career
- Allegiance: Australia; United Arab Emirates
- Branch: Australian Army; United Arab Emirates Presidential Guard
- Service years: 1976–2009; 2010–present
- Rank: Lieutenant General
- Commands: Zayed Military University (2024–); UAE Presidential Guard (2011–24); Training Command - Army (2009); Joint Task Force 633 (2008–09); Special Operations Command (2004–08); Special Air Service Regiment (1997–98)
- Conflicts: Operation Pollard; Iraq War; Operation Bastille; Operation Falconer; War in Afghanistan; Operation Slipper; Yemeni Civil War
- Awards: Officer of the Order of Australia; Distinguished Service Cross; Conspicuous Service Cross

Lieutenant General Michael Simon Hindmarsh, AO, DSC, CSC (born 1956) is an Australian-Emirati army officer who is the current president of Zayed Military University in Abu Dhabi, United Arab Emirates.

A retired senior officer of the Australian Army, Hindmarsh spent 33 years in the Australian Defence Force, during which he served as commanding officer of the Special Air Service Regiment from 1997 to 1998, Commander Special Operations Command from 2004 to 2008, and Commander of Joint Task Force 633 in the Middle East Area of Operations from March 2008 to January 2009. He retired from the Australian Army in mid-2009, and joined the United Arab Emirates Armed Forces as a special advisor to the Crown Prince Sheikh Mohamad Bin Zayed Al Nahyan and later as commander from 2011 to 2024 of the UAE Presidential Guard, a formation that includes both conventional and special forces units. He also heads the UAE Armed Forces Transformation Program and is also the Chairman of the Board of Trustee for the Rabdan Academy.

== Military career ==
=== Australia ===
Hindmarsh entered the Royal Military College, Duntroon, in 1976, graduating into the Royal Australian Infantry Corps in 1978.

Hindmarsh saw regimental service as a platoon commander with the 2nd/4th Battalion, Royal Australian Regiment and as a troop commander, squadron commander and commanding officer with the Special Air Service Regiment (SASR). Other appointments included: SO3 Operations at HQ Land Command; SO2 Training at HQ UK Special Forces; SO1 Operations at HQ Special Forces; and Brigade level tactics instructor at the Land Warfare Centre.

As commanding officer of the SASR, Hindmarsh commanded the ANZAC Special Operations Force detachment to Operation Pollard in Kuwait in 1998. Hindmarsh was later appointed to command the Special Operations Component on Operation Bastille and Operation Falconer in the Iraq War. He was appointed a Member of the Order of Australia for his distinguished leadership in this position.

Hindmarsh served as Commander Special Operations Command from October 2004 to February 2008. He was appointed an Officer of the Order of Australia in the 2008 Australia Day Honours for his distinguished service in that position.

Hindmarsh assumed command of Australian Forces in the Middle East Area of Operations on 1 March 2008; he succeeded Major General Mark Evans in this position. His tour ended on 12 January 2009, at which time he was succeeded by Major General Mark Kelly. For his "distinguished command and leadership in action in the Middle East", Hindmarsh was awarded the Distinguished Service Cross.

From March 2009 until his retirement from the Australian Army in the later half of 2009, Hindmarsh assumed command of Army Training Command at Victoria Barracks, Sydney.

=== United Arab Emirates ===
Following retirement from the Australian Army, in late 2009 Hindmarsh accepted the position of Special Advisor – National Security to the United Arab Emirates, and in 2011 major general in charge of the United Arab Emirates Presidential Guard. He relinquished command of the Presidential Guard in 2024 and currently commands Zayed Military University and leads the program for the modernisation of the UAE Armed Forces. Hindmarsh was invited by Mohammed bin Zayed Al Nahyan to help reorganise the Emirati military.

On 8 February 2016 an ABC News report questioned the extent of Hindmarsh's knowledge of civilian deaths allegedly caused during the operation of UAE forces in Yemen, as a result of his ongoing employment as a security advisor to the government.

== Personal ==
Hindmarsh was educated at the Anglican Church Grammar School in Brisbane. He is a graduate of the Army Command and Staff College, Queenscliff, the Joint Services Staff College and the United Kingdom Royal College of Defence Studies. He is married and has three sons. He enjoys mountaineering, rock climbing, bush walking and rugby union.

== Honours and awards ==

Officer of the Order of Australia (AO)	2008
Member of the Order of Australia (AM)	2003
Distinguished Service Cross (DSC)	2009
Conspicuous Service Cross (CSC)	1998
Australian Active Service Medal	
Afghanistan Medal	
Iraq Medal	
Australian Service Medal	
Defence Force Service Medal with 3 Rosettes	for 30–34 years of service
Australian Defence Medal	
NATO Medal	with ISAF Clasp

Hindmarsh is a patron of The Grub Club, the organisation set up in memory of Sergeant Matthew Locke.

Military offices
Preceded by Major General Mark Evans	Commander Joint Task Force 633; 2008–2009	Succeeded by Major General Mark Kelly
Preceded by Major General Duncan Lewis	Special Operations Commander; 2004–2008	Succeeded by Major General Tim McOwan
