= Martin Wallace (soldier) =

Recipient of the Medal for Gallantry

- Born: 1969 (age 56–57); Sydney, New South Wales
- Military career
- Allegiance: Australia
- Branch: Australian Army
- Service years: 1987–
- Nickname: Jock
- Unit: Special Air Service Regiment
- Conflicts: War in Afghanistan; Operation Slipper; Operation Anaconda; Iraq War; Operation Falconer
- Awards: Medal for Gallantry

Martin 'Jock' Wallace, MG (born 1969) grew up in Tamworth, New South Wales, and enlisted in the Australian Army in 1987 at the age of seventeen. He was a member of 152 Signals Squadron and served as a signalman with the Special Air Service Regiment (SASR) when he was awarded the Medal for Gallantry (MG) for his actions on 2 March 2002 during Operation Anaconda while attached to the United States 10th Mountain Division in the Shahi Kot Valley, Afghanistan. He was aged 32 at the time.

The book 18 Hours: The True Story of an SAS War Hero by Sandra Lee, published in 2006, describes the circumstances and his actions that led to the award of the Medal for Gallantry. The medal was presented by the Governor General, Peter Hollingworth, on 27 November 2002. Three other SAS soldiers, (a corporal, a sergeant and a captain), also received awards anonymously for their involvement in the same action. The regiment's commanding officer, (then Lieutenant Colonel Gus Gilmore), was awarded the Distinguished Service Cross (DSC).

== Honours and awards ==
Medal for Gallantry (MG)	27 November 2003
Australian Active Service Medal	with 2 bars for 'ICAT' and 'IRAQ 2003'
Afghanistan Medal	
Iraq Medal	
Australian Service Medal	
Defence Long Service Medal with 2 Rosette's	for 25–29 years of service
Australian Defence Medal	
