= Australian twenty five-cent coin =

Twenty five cents
- Australia
- Value: 0.25 AUD
- Mass: 12 g
- Diameter: 29 mm
- Thickness: 2.5 mm
- Edge: Milled; Reeded
- Composition: Nordic gold and a mix of aluminium, bronze and zinc Copper plated steel
- Years of minting: 2016, 2017

Obverse
- Design: Queen Elizabeth II, Queen of Australia

Reverse
- Design: Our Legends, Battle of Long Tan, Kokoda, Peace (2016); Victoria Cross, George Cross, Distinguished Flying Cross, Medal for Gallantry (2017)

The twenty five-cent coin of the Australian decimal currency system was issued as a part of a 14-coin collectors’ set on from 10 April 2016 to 23 April 2016. The coins were sold for $3 in conjunction with a local news corp paper.

The 4 different coins commemorate the 2016 Anzac to Afghanistan campaign. The first coin was issued on the 10 of April with the front displaying 'Learn the Legend. The second coin was issued on 16 April 2016 with the Kokoda trail featuring on the coin. The third coin was issued on 17 April 2016 commemorating the Battle of Long Tan and the final coin was issued on 23 April 2016 commemorating peace.

The copper coins were again released commemorative as part of the Legends of the ANZACs coin collection in 2017. The coins, designed by Aaron Baggio, featured four Australian war medals; the Victoria Cross, the George Cross, the Distinguished Flying Cross, and the Medal for Gallantry.

Each coin is sold in a protective packet but is usable as Australian Legal Tender. It is the first gold legal tender coin since the Australian Two Dollar coin was introduced in 1988.

== Design ==
Year	Series	Subject	Mintage
2016	ANZAC to Afghanistan	Our Legends	1,000,000
2016	ANZAC to Afghanistan	Battle of Long Tan	1,000,000
2016	ANZAC to Afghanistan	Kokoda	1,000,000
2016	ANZAC to Afghanistan	Peace	1,000,000
2017	Legends of the ANZACs	Victoria Cross	N/A
2017	Legends of the ANZACs	George Cross	N/A
2017	Legends of the ANZACs	Distinguished Flying Cross	N/A
2017	Legends of the ANZACs	Medal for Gallantry	N/A

According to RAM's 2015-16 Annual Report, the 2016 mintage figures are:

2016 25¢ "Peace" - 266,700

2016 25¢ "Our Legends" - 500,300

2016 25¢ "Kokoda" - 268,200

2016 25¢ "Long Tan" - 271,200

According to RAM's 2016-17 Annual Report, the 2017 mintage figures are:

2017 25¢ "Victoria Cross" - 456,000

2017 25¢ "George Cross" - 247,643

2017 25¢ "Dist. Flying Cross" - 261,702

2017 25¢ "Medal For Gallantry" - 261,653

This makes the George Cross the rarest of the series, and the Our Legends the least rarest.

== See also ==
- Coins of the Australian dollar
