= Ash Power =

Australian Army officer

Brian Ashley Power
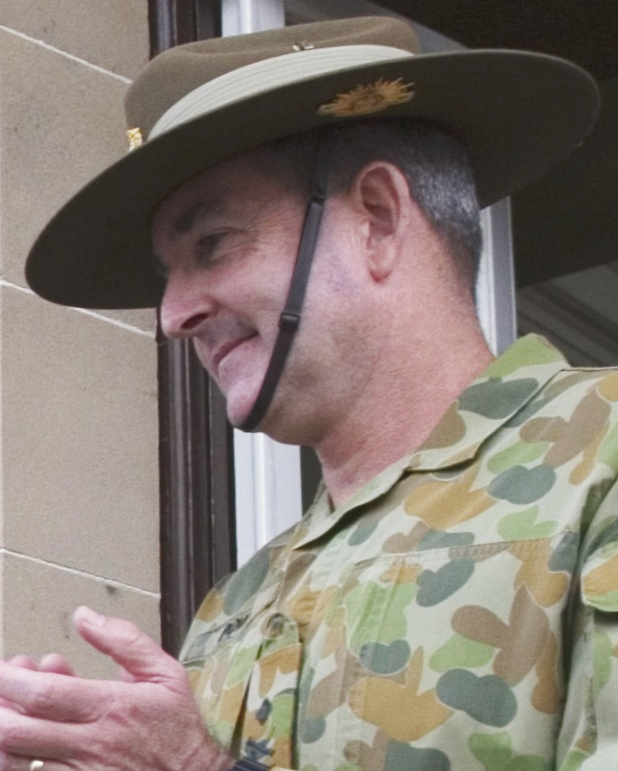
- Power c. 2007
- Born: 20 January 1957 (age 69); Wangaratta, Victoria
- Military career
- Allegiance: Australia
- Branch: Australian Army
- Service years: 1975–2014
- Rank: Lieutenant General
- Commands: Chief of Joint Operations; Training Command; 1st Division; 1st Brigade; 4th Field Regiment
- Conflicts: International Force East Timor; War in Afghanistan; Operation Slipper; Iraq War; Operation Catalyst
- Awards: Officer of the Order of Australia; Conspicuous Service Cross; Officer of the Legion of Merit (United States); Meritorious Service Medal (United States)

Lieutenant General Brian Ashley "Ash" Power AO, CSC (born 20 January 1957) is a retired senior officer of the Australian Army. Power served as Chief of Joint Operations from 2011 until his retirement in May 2014.

== Military career ==
Power entered the Royal Military College, Duntroon in January 1975. He graduated nearly four years later in December 1978 and was allocated to the Royal Australian Artillery. He was posted to the 4th Field Regiment for regimental duty and performed the functions of Section Commander, Gun Position Officer, and Assistant Adjutant. He later returned to command the Regiment, for which he was awarded the Conspicuous Service Cross in 1998.

He has been an instructor at the School of Artillery, the Royal Military College, Duntroon and the Royal Military Academy Sandhurst, Camberley, United Kingdom, and has also attended Command and Staff College, Bangkok, Thailand.

In November 1998 Power deployed to Bougainville Island on Operation Belisi as the Chief of Staff, and in September 1999 was deployed as the Colonel Operations for International Force East Timor (INTERFET). He was posted as the Defence Attaché Thailand in January 2000, and on his return in January 2002, studied at the Australian Centre for Defence and Strategic Studies, Canberra.

Power was promoted to brigadier on 22 November 2002, and assumed command of the 1st Brigade on 6 December 2002.

In 2005 Power was promoted to major general, and assumed command of the 1st Division on 2 July 2005.

In June 2006 he became a Member of the Order of Australia, and in November 2006 was posted as Commander Joint Task Force 636.

Power served as Australian Commander of Exercise Talisman Sabre 2007 (TS07) before assuming command of Training Command, Army on 6 July 2007.

In May 2011, Power was promoted to lieutenant general and appointed Chief of Joint Operations (CJOPS) and Commander of Headquarters, Joint Operations Command (HQJOC). He was upgraded to an Officer of the Order of Australia in the 2012 Australia Day Honours List.

Ash Power is a veteran of Iraq, Afghanistan, East Timor and Bougainville.

== Personal ==
In 1978, Power married Narelle. They have two daughters.

== Honours and awards ==

Officer of the Order of Australia (AO)	26 January 2012
Member of the Order of Australia (AM)	(12 June 2006)
Conspicuous Service Cross (CSC)	26 January 1998
Australian Active Service Medal	with EAST TIMOR, ICAT clasps
INTERFET medal	
Afghanistan Medal	
Australian Service Medal	with BOUGAINVILLE clasp
Defence Force Service Medal with 4 clasps	(35–39 years of service)
Australian Defence Medal	
ISAF	NATO ISAF medal – 'International Security Assistance Force' medal
Officer of the Legion of Merit (United States)	c. March 2006
Meritorious Service Medal (United States)	

Military offices
Preceded by Lieutenant General Mark Evans	Chief of Joint Operations; 2011–2014	Succeeded by Vice Admiral David Johnston
Preceded by Major General Mark Kelly	Commander 1st Division; 2005–2007	Succeeded by Major General Richard Wilson
