= Mark Evans (general) =

Australian Army officer (born 1953)

Lieutenant General Mark Evans AO DSC
- Major General Mark Evans, early 2008
- Born: 24 April 1953 (age 73); Kluang, Malaya
- Military career
- Allegiance: United Kingdom; Australia
- Branch: British Army (1973–76); Australian Army (1976–11)
- Service years: 1973–2011
- Rank: Lieutenant general
- Commands: Chief of Joint Operations (2008–11); Joint Task Force 633 (2007–08); 1st Division (2002–04); 3rd Brigade (1998–01); 6th Battalion, Royal Australian Regiment (1992–93)
- Conflicts: The Troubles; International Force for East Timor; War in Afghanistan; Iraq War
- Awards: Officer of the Order of Australia; Distinguished Service Cross; Decoration of Merit (Netherlands)

Lieutenant General Mark Evans (born 24 April 1953) is a retired senior officer in the Australian Army. He was chief of joint operations from July 2008 until his retirement in May 2011.

== Early years ==
Evans was born in Kluang, Malaya, on 24 April 1953 to William Eric and Valerie Doreen Evans, and was educated in the United Kingdom.

== Military career ==
=== British Army ===
He was a cadet in the Worcestershire Army Cadet Force (ACF), in Droitwich Troop, a detachment affiliated to the Queen's Own Hussars. He achieved the rare appointment of cadet under officer before leaving the ACF for the Regular Army. Evans spent five years in the British Army, which included officer training at the Royal Military Academy Sandhurst and regimental duties with the Worcestershire and Sherwood Foresters Regiment in Berlin. During this time, he was involved in counter insurgency operations in Northern Ireland. He was commissioned as a second lieutenant on 9 March 1973, and promoted to lieutenant on 8 September 1974. Evans resigned his British commission on 13 April 1976.

=== Australian Army ===
Evans resigned his British commission on 13 April 1976 and joined the Australian Army, where he was first posted to the 6th Battalion, Royal Australian Regiment (6 RAR). In 1979–80, he held the position (as a captain) of officer commanding C Company at the Australian Army Apprentice School at Balcombe, Victoria. In 1985, he served with the United Nations in the Middle East.

In 1989, he was appointed as brigade major of 3rd Brigade and, in 1991, promoted to lieutenant colonel at Australian Defence Force Headquarters. Between 1992 and 1993, he commanded 6 RAR, for which he was appointed a Member of the Order of Australia.

In December 1994, Evans was promoted to colonel, and in 1998 to brigadier commanding the 3rd Brigade. During this time he commanded the brigade on operations in East Timor, during Operation Warden, for which he was awarded the Distinguished Service Cross.

In July 2002, he was promoted to major general and assumed command of the 1st Division at Gallipoli Barracks. On 13 April 2004, he assumed the new position of deputy chief of joint operations at Headquarters Joint Operations Command in Sydney. In July 2005, he was appointed as head Defence Personnel Executive in Canberra and, in June 2007, awarded an Officer of the Order of Australia.

On 17 June 2007, Evans assumed command of Joint Task Force 633, Australia's contribution in the Middle East Area of Operations to the Global War on Terror. During that time, he was responsible for Australian Defence Force operations in Iraq, Afghanistan and the North Persian Gulf. He was succeeded in that position by Major General Mike Hindmarsh in an official ceremony on 1 March 2008.

On 20 March 2008, it was announced that he was to be promoted to the rank of lieutenant general and would assume the position of chief of joint operations from 4 July 2008. Evans retired from the Australian Army on 19 May 2011.

== Personal life ==
Evans married Veronica Ann Higley on 9 September 1974. They have an adult son and daughter. Evans has a wide variety of interests that include military history, reading, walking and watching Veronica gardening.

== Honours and awards ==

Officer of the Order of Australia (AO)	11 June 2007
Member of the Order of Australia (AM)	26 January 1994
Distinguished Service Cross (DSC)	4 April 2000
UK General Service Medal	with 1 Clasp Northern Ireland
Australian Active Service Medal	with 2 Clasps EAST TIMOR and IRAQ 2003
International Force East Timor Medal (INTERFET)	
Afghanistan Medal	
Iraq Medal	
Australian Service Medal	with 1 Clasp Middle East
Defence Force Service Medal with 4 rosettes	35–39 years service
Australian Defence Medal	
UNTSO Medal (United Nations)	
NATO ISAF Medal (NATO)	
Gold Decoration of Merit (Netherlands)	16 September 2010

Military offices
Preceded by Lieutenant General David Hurley	Chief of Joint Operations; 2008–2011	Succeeded by Lieutenant General Ash Power
Preceded by Brigadier Michael Crane	Commander Joint Task Force 633; 2007–2008	Succeeded by Major General Mike Hindmarsh
Preceded by Major General Jim Molan	Commander 1st Division; 2002–2004	Succeeded by Major General Mark Kelly
