= Martin Wallace =

Martin Wallace may refer to:

- Martin Wallace (American football) (born 1990), American football player
- Martin Wallace (bishop) (born 1948), Bishop of Selby
- Martin Wallace (game designer), English game designer
- Martin Wallace (soldier) (born 1969), Australian SASR soldier
- Martin Kelso Wallace (1898–1978), Lord Mayor of Belfast
- Martin R. M. Wallace (1829–1902), American Union brevet brigadier general
