= Doug Baird (Australian footballer) =

Australian rules footballer (born 1950)

Doug Baird OAM
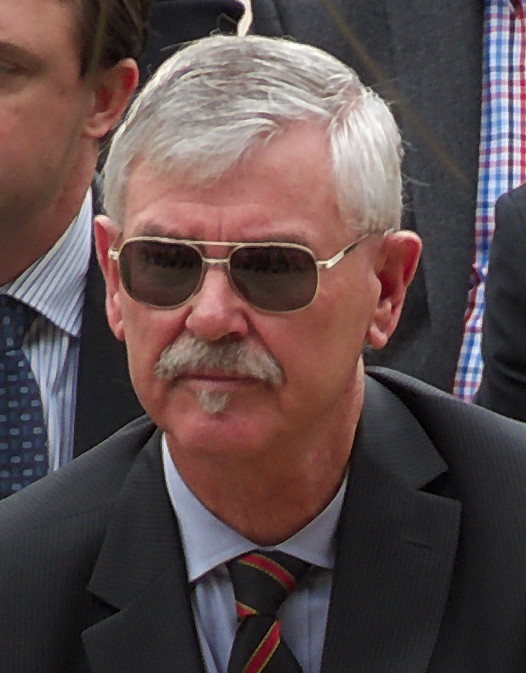
- Baird in March 2015

Personal information
- Full name: Douglas Lindsay Baird
- Born: 16 November 1950 (age 75)
- Original team: Paramount
- Height: 188 cm (6 ft 2 in)
- Weight: 88 kg (194 lb)

Playing career^{1}
Years	Club	Games (Goals)
1969–1970	Carlton	6 (8)
- ^{1} Playing statistics correct to the end of 1970.

Douglas Lindsay Baird OAM (born 16 November 1950) is a former Australian rules footballer who played with Carlton in the Victorian Football League (VFL).

His son Cameron was an Australian soldier and posthumous recipient of the Victoria Cross for Australia.

Doug Baird was awarded the Medal of the Order of Australia in the 2019 Queen's Birthday Honours for service to veterans and their families.
