= Defence Honours and Awards scandal =

Changing of honours

The Defence Honours and Awards scandal is an ongoing debate about the validity of several decorations awarded to individuals within the distinguished service decorations suite of medals since its inception in 1993. The top two awards requiring the recipient to have distinguished themselves 'in action', however the top award had been awarded to individuals who were in some cases several thousand kilometres away from the front line.

In 2024, an Australian Senate review was launched to investigate awards made under the Defence Honours and Awards system.

== Background ==
The distinguished service decorations were established on 15 January 1991 by letters patent as a three tier award with varying eligibility criteria. The Distinguished Service Cross was established with the criteria "Distinguished command and leadership in action", the Distinguished Service Medal with "Distinguished leadership in action" and the Commendation for Distinguished Service with "distinguished performance of duties in warlike operations". The awarding of the top two tiers required recipients to have distinguished themselves on the battle field 'in action'. The term 'in action' is defined by the Defence Honours and Awards Appeals Tribunal as "involving armed conflict in close proximity to or under the fire of an adversary."

In 1993, the 1st Battalion, Royal Australian Regiment (1RAR) deployed to Somalia on Operation Solace, as part of the Australian contribution to a United Nations peacemaking mission in Somalia. At the time and during later honours reviews, the operation had not been considered a 'warlike operation', however nine distinguished service decorations had been awarded to personnel for actions during the operation. These included 2 DSC's, 1 DSM and 6 CDS's. The first recipients of the distinguished service cross was Colonel William Mellor, commander Australian forces Somalia and Lieutenant Colonel David Hurley, commanding officer of 1RAR. Colonel Mellor was awarded the distinguished service cross for "distinguished command and leadership as Commander, Australian Force Somalia" and Lieutenant Colonel Hurley was awarded the same decoration for "distinguished command and leadership as Commanding Officer, 1st Battalion, The Royal Australian Regiment, Group in Somalia." Both failed to mention 'in action' as part of the citations. The official defence standing is that service in Somalia from 17 October 1992 to 30 April 1993 was found to be 'warlike' by the 2022 Inquiry into unit recognition for Australian Defence Force service in Somalia by the Defence Honours and Awards Appeals Tribunal. Regardless of how distinguished the command or distinguished the leadership officers had performed, due to the lack of engagement with rebel forces in Somalia, the highest awards that could have been achieved was that of Officer of the Order of Australia, Member of the Order of Australia or Commendation for Distinguished Service.

The 2007 Review of Defence Honours, Awards and Commendation Policies conducted by the Department of Defence found that the distinguished service decorations had been awarded liberally and that the "DSC was awarded inappropriately to officers who were not directly commanding forces in the course of armed combat." It was proposed in the same review that a meritorious service decoration suite of medals be established to sit in the order of wear between the distinguished service decorations and conspicuous service decorations. and would take the form of the Meritorious Service Cross and Meritorious Service Medal. and would allow for senior officers to be recognised for distinguished/meritorious performance in non-warlike and warlike operations that didn't require the recipient to be in action. This would then inevitably tighten the definition of ‘in action’ to remove any potential for ambiguity.

In May 2009, the federal member for Eden-Monaro Mike Kelly wrote to the Prime Minister, Kevin Rudd to reinforce the recommendations made during the 2007 review. This included the establishment of the meritorious service decorations, he raised that the new awards would fill the gap between the distinguished service cross and medal and commendation for distinguished service. In the letter, it was stated that "A new set of awards be established to recognise such performance of duty in wartlike operations but not in combat roles". In June 2009, Senator for Queensland Joe Ludwig responded to Mike Kelly, confirming that a gap in the honours system was present, however it was recommended that the distinguished service decorations criteria change to better recognise the outstanding performance and achievement of ADF members who, although in warlike situations, are not in action in lieu of the creation of a new medallic suite. On 22 February 2012, Changes to the award criteria for the distinguished service decorations were gazetted. The criteria changed from 'in action' to 'in warlike operations'.

=== Attempted revocations of decorations ===
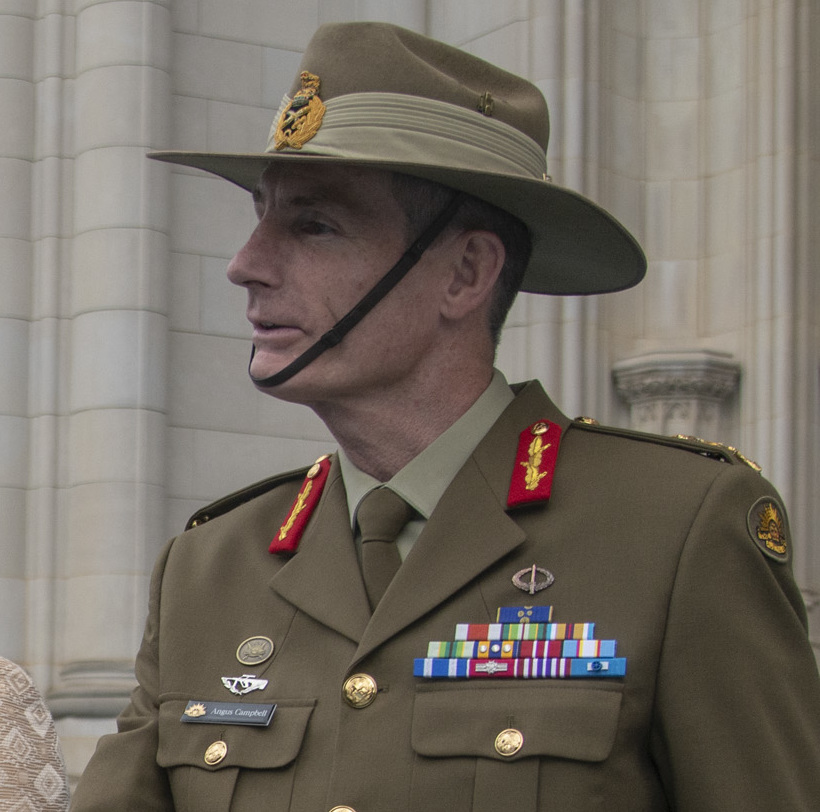
Campbell with medal ribbons in 2018

Following the release of the Brereton Report on 19 November 2020, the Chief of the Defence Force General Angus Campbell wrote to the Governor-General David Hurley recommending that the Meritorious Unit Citation be revoked for Task Force 66 (Special Operations Task Groups IV – XX), originally awarded on 26 January 2015. In April 2021, Defence Minister Peter Dutton reversed this decision, but stated that those who have a conviction, or a finding of inappropriate behaviour, will have their citation revoked.

In late November 2022, Campbell gave officers of Captain to Brigadier rank "28 days to prove their service in the Afghanistan war was distinguished". Up to 3,000 Australian Defence Force members faced potentially having their medals revoked. At the time of the most serious allegations in 2012, Campbell was serving as the Commander Joint Task Force 633, for which he was awarded the Distinguished Service Cross. This has led to calls for Campbell to be stripped of his decoration due to findings of the Brereton Report, the criteria for the award of the Distinguished Service Cross was brought into question as his citation read 'in action' and not 'in warlike operations'. It was reported in the Sydney Morning Herald that Campbell attempted to return his Distinguished Service Cross following the publication of the Brereton Report, and that the offer was rejected by Defence Minister Linda Reynolds. On 15 June 2023, Senator Malcolm Roberts of the Senate Estimates Committee asked the Department of Defence on notice if this was the case, they replied "No".

In May 2023, Campbell again attempted to strip some defence force members of their distinguished and conspicuous service decorations, notifying several Afghanistan War veterans that he had referred the termination of their decorations to Defence Minister Richard Marles. This lead renewed calls for Campbell to return his distinguished service cross by retired liberal leader of the South Australian opposition Martin Hamilton-Smith. This resulted in a group of Afghanistan War veterans to start a petition for a formal review of awards given to Commanders of Joint Task Force 633. The petition gained 1696 signatures and requested that "We therefore ask the House to request that the Defence Minister direct that the Defence Honours and Awards Appeals Tribunal inquire into the awards given to Commanders of JTF 633, pursuant to section 110W of the Defence Act 1903 and subject to appropriate terms of reference.' In June 2024, another group of Afghanistan War veterans called for a review of the 12 Distinguished Crosses and one bar made out to various commanders of Joint Task Force 633.

== Senate inquiry ==
On 3 July 2024 following a successful motion by Senator Malcolm Roberts the Senate referred an inquiry into the Defence honours and awards system to the Foreign Affairs, Defence and Trade Reference Committee. The motion passed with a vote of 32 to 31 and was opposed by both the Australian Labor Party and the Greens.

The terms of reference for the inquiry are;

- a) experiences of Australian Defence Force (ADF) personnel progressing through the honours and awards system;
- b) the effect of awards and honours on maintaining morale within the ADF;
- c) assurance of the integrity of awards to senior officers for conduct in the Afghanistan conflict;
- d) the effect of changes in criteria for some honours and awards from ‘in action’ to ‘in warlike operations’;
- e) the operation of the Defence Honours and Awards Appeals Tribunal, including any potential improvements;
- f) any potential improvements to the Defence honours and awards system; and
- g) any related matters.

== Gallery ==
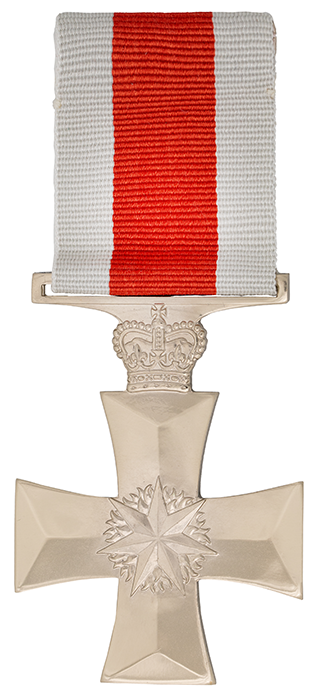
The Distinguished Service Cross.

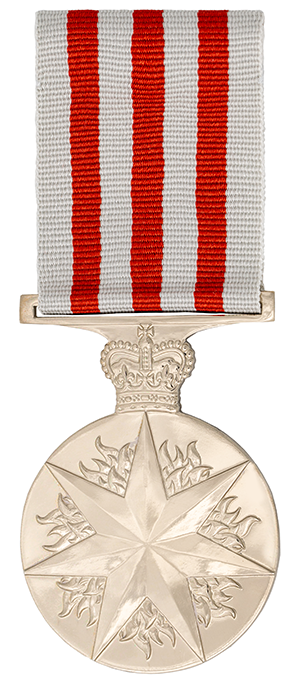
The Distinguished Service Medal.

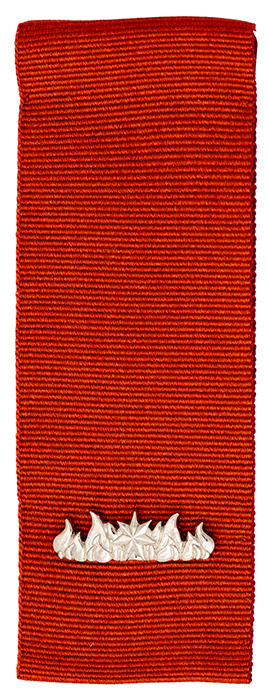
The Commendation for Distinguished Service

== See also ==
- List of recipients of the Distinguished Service Cross
