= Cameron Baird =

Australian Army VC (1981–2013)

Cameron Baird VC MG
- Born: 7 June 1981; Burnie, Tasmania, Australia
- Died: 22 June 2013 (aged 32); Khod Valley, Uruzgan province, Afghanistan
- Military career
- Allegiance: Australia
- Branch: Australian Army
- Service years: 2000–2004; 2006–2013
- Rank: Corporal
- Units: 4th Battalion, Royal Australian Regiment; 2nd Commando Regiment
- Conflicts: East Timor (UN); War in Afghanistan; Iraq War
- Awards: Victoria Cross for Australia; Medal for Gallantry; Meritorious Service Medal (NATO)

Cameron Stewart Baird, VC, MG (7 June 1981 – 22 June 2013) was a soldier in the Australian Army who was posthumously awarded the Victoria Cross for Australia, the highest award in the Australian honours system. Baird was the fourth person to receive the Victoria Cross for Australia during Operation Slipper.

== Early life ==
Baird was born in Burnie, Tasmania, on 7 June 1981, the son of Kaye and Doug Baird, a former Carlton Football Club player who, at the time, was coaching the Cooee Football Club. In 1984, Cameron, his parents and older brother Brendan, moved to Victoria and grew up in Gladstone Park, a north western suburb of Melbourne. Baird was educated at Gladstone Views Primary School before completing his Victorian Certificate of Education at Gladstone Park Secondary College.

Baird was a talented junior Australian rules footballer who played with the Calder Cannons and one game for Geelong in the Victorian Football League. He nominated for the 1999 AFL draft, but suffered a shoulder injury late in the 1999 season, and was not selected by any AFL teams. He joined the army shortly afterwards.

== Military career ==
Baird joined the Army in January 2000 and upon completion of his initial employment training was posted to the then 4th Battalion, Royal Australian Regiment (Commando), now the 2nd Commando Regiment, in February 2000. After being discharged in 2004, Baird re-enlisted in 2006 and in both periods of service, he was assigned to the 4th Battalion, Royal Australian Regiment (Commando).

=== Military operations ===
During Corporal Baird's service in the Australian Army, he deployed on the following operations:

- Operation TANAGER (Timor-Leste) – April 2001 – October 2001
- Operation BASTILLE (Iraq) – February 2003 – March 2003
- Operation FALCONER (Iraq) – March 2003 – May 2003
- Operation SLIPPER (Afghanistan) – August 2007 – January 2008
- Operation SLIPPER (Afghanistan) – March 2009 – July 2009
- Operation SLIPPER (Afghanistan) – July 2011 – February 2012
- Operation SLIPPER (Afghanistan) – February 2013 – June 2013.

=== Medal for Gallantry ===
In 2007, Baird was awarded the Medal for Gallantry for his actions in a search and clearance operation of a Taliban stronghold.

For gallantry in action during close quarters combat in Afghanistan on Operation SLIPPER.

Lance Corporal Cameron Stewart Baird was part of a Commando Company mission assigned for clearance and search of a Taliban stronghold in November 2007. During the initial phase of the clearance, Lance Corporal Baird's Platoon came under heavy fire and during the ensuing close-range fire-fight, a member of his team was mortally wounded. Displaying complete disregard for his own safety, Lance Corporal Baird led other members of his team forward under heavy fire from machine guns and assault rifles to recover the wounded team member back to a position of cover.

He then re-entered the compound and continued to engage the enemy. Even though under constant fire, Lance Corporal Baird continually moved amongst his team members coordinating their fire, and throwing grenades to neutralise the enemy machine gun positions. Once the close quarter battle had been won, Lance Corporal Baird again led his team forward and began room-to-room clearance, where he was again engaged by several enemies. Lance Corporal Baird continued to lead the fight, killing several enemies and successfully completing the clearance.

Throughout the action, Lance Corporal Baird displayed conspicuous gallantry, composure and superior leadership under fire. He was personally responsible for killing several enemy combatants during the clearance, ensuring the momentum of the assault was maintained, and undoubtedly preventing further members of his section from becoming casualties. His performance and his actions were of the highest order and were in the finest traditions of the Australian Army and the Australian Defence Force.

=== Victoria Cross for Australia ===
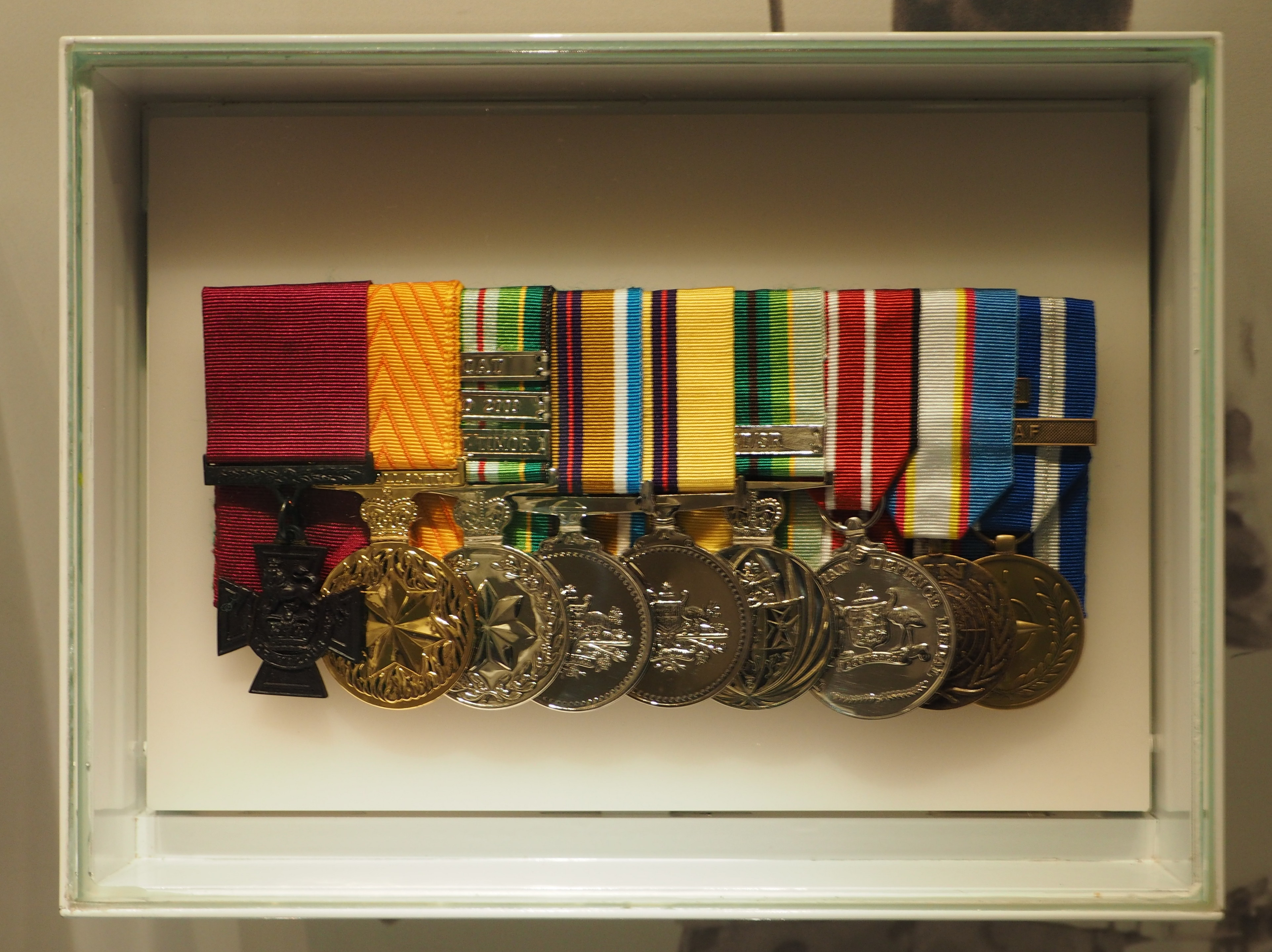
Baird's medals, including his Victoria Cross for Australia, on display at the Australian War Memorial

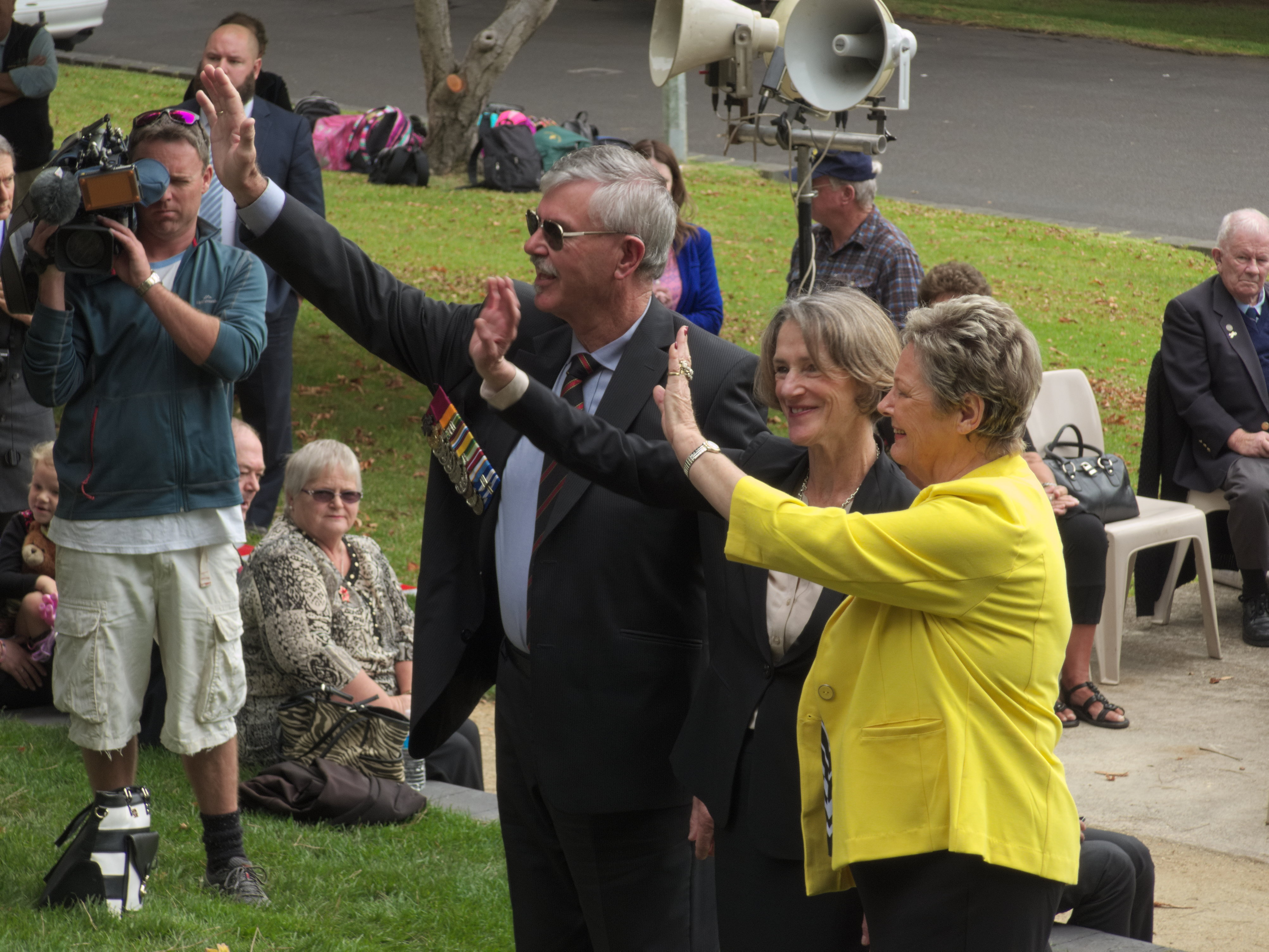
Doug and Kaye Baird and the Governor of Tasmania unveiling a memorial plinth in Burnie.

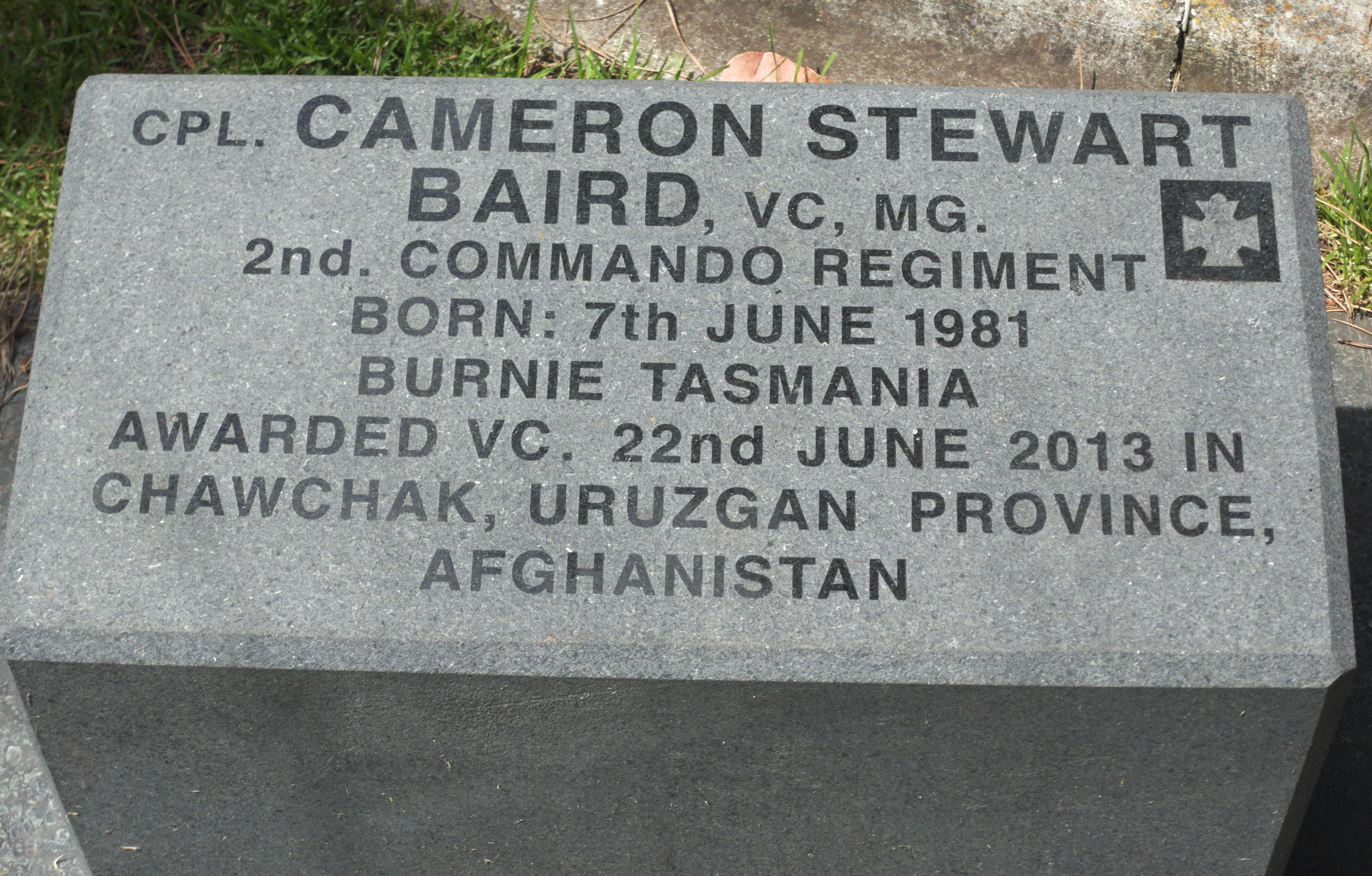
Memorial plinth in Burnie.

In February 2014, Baird was awarded the Victoria Cross for Australia. Baird was killed in operations in Afghanistan on 22 June 2013. The citation for his Victoria Cross reads:

For the most conspicuous acts of valour, extreme devotion to duty and ultimate self-sacrifice at Ghawchak village, Uruzgan province, Afghanistan, as a Commando Team Commander in Special Operations Task Group on Operation SLIPPER.

On 22 June 2013, a commando platoon of the Special Operations Task Group, with partners from the Afghan National Security Forces, conducted a helicopter assault into Ghawchak village, Uruzgan province, in order to attack an insurgent network deep within enemy-held territory. Shortly after insertion, Corporal Baird’s team was engaged by small arms fire from several enemy positions. Corporal Baird quickly seized the initiative, leading his team to neutralise the positions, killing six enemy combatants and enabling the assault to continue.

Soon afterwards, an adjacent Special Operations Task Group team came under heavy enemy fire, resulting in its commander being seriously wounded. Without hesitation, Corporal Baird led his team to provide support. En route, he and his team were engaged by rifle and machine gun fire from prepared enemy positions. With complete disregard for his own safety, Corporal Baird charged towards the enemy positions, supported by his team. On nearing the positions, he and his team were engaged by additional enemy on their flank. Instinctively, Corporal Baird neutralised the new threat with grenades and rifle fire, enabling his team to close with the prepared position. With the prepared position now isolated, Corporal Baird manoeuvred and was engaged by enemy machine gun fire, the bullets striking the ground around him. Displaying great valour, he drew the fire, moved to cover, and suppressed the enemy machine gun position. This action enabled his team to close on the entrance to the prepared position, thus regaining the initiative.

On three occasions Corporal Baird charged an enemy-held building within the prepared compound. On the first occasion he charged the door to the building, followed by another team member. Despite being totally exposed and immediately engaged by enemy fire, Corporal Baird pushed forward while firing into the building. Now in the closest proximity to the enemy, he was forced to withdraw when his rifle ceased to function. On rectifying his rifle stoppage, and reallocating remaining ammunition within his team, Corporal Baird again advanced towards the door of the building, once more under heavy fire. He engaged the enemy through the door but was unable to suppress the position and took cover to reload. For a third time, Corporal Baird selflessly drew enemy fire away from his team and assaulted the doorway. Enemy fire was seen to strike the ground and compound walls around Corporal Baird, before visibility was obscured by dust and smoke. In this third attempt, the enemy was neutralised and the advantage was regained, but Corporal Baird was killed in the effort.

Corporal Baird’s acts of valour and self-sacrifice regained the initiative and preserved the lives of his team members. His actions were of the highest order and in keeping with the finest traditions of the Australian Army and the Australian Defence Force.

== Legacy ==
The ‘Baird, VC MG Trophy’ is named for CPL Cameron Baird, and is awarded to the Most Outstanding Soldier in each Platoon at the completion of Australian Army Basic (Recruit) Training, which takes place at the 1st Recruit Training Battalion - the Home of the Australian Soldier.

The Most Outstanding Soldier trophy is awarded to the recruit who has achieved above average results in all aspects of recruit training, and has demonstrated beyond reproach the qualities of loyalty, teamwork, integrity, honour and dedication to duty. CPL Baird himself was a former recipient of this Award upon the completion of his own Recruit Training in February 2000.

Baird's portrait appears on a 70c Australian postage stamp, in the 2015 'Australian Legends' series. The other four stamps in the series, also all 70c denominations, feature other VC recipients.

With the support of Baird's parents, Baird's image was used for the 2023 ANZAC Day jersey for the Gold Coast Titans.

== Honours and awards ==

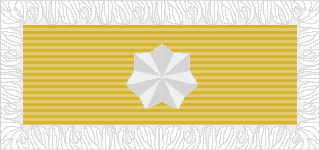

Ribbon	Description	Notes
Ribbon of the Victoria Cross for Australia	Victoria Cross for Australia	13 February 2014 (posthumous), for most conspicuous acts of valour, extreme devotion to duty and ultimate self-sacrifice at a village in Uruzgan province in Afghanistan as a commando team leader.
Ribbon of the Medal for Gallantry	Medal for Gallantry	
Ribbon of the AASM	Australian Active Service Medal	with clasps for EAST TIMOR, ICAT and IRAQ 2003
Ribbon of the Afghanistan Medal for Australia	Afghanistan Medal	
Ribbon of the Iraq Medal for Australia	Iraq Medal	
Ribbon of the Australian Service Medal	Australian Service Medal	with clasps for CT/SR (Counter Terrorism / Special Recovery)
Ribbon of the ADM	Australian Defence Medal	
Ribbon of the United Nations Medal (UNAMET)	United Nations Medal	with UNAMET ribbon for active service in Timor-Leste (East Timor)
Ribbon of the NATO Meritorious Service Medal	NATO Meritorious Service Medal	(NATO) 20 June 2014
Ribbon of the NATO Medal for ISAF	NATO Medal for the Non-Article 5 ISAF Operation in Afghanistan	with ISAF clasp
Meritorious Unit Citation	Meritorious Unit Citation with Federation Star	Awarded to Task Force 66 in the 2015 Australia Day Honours
	Returned from Active Service Badge	
