= John Cantwell (general) =

Australian Army officer

John Patrick Cantwell
- Major General John Cantwell on 25 April 2012
- Born: 9 October 1956 (age 70); Ipswich, Queensland
- Military career
- Allegiance: Australia
- Branch: Australian Army
- Service years: 1974–2012
- Rank: Major General
- Commands: Joint Task Force 633 (2010–11); Deputy Chief of Army (2007–08); 1st Brigade (2004–05)
- Conflicts: Gulf War; Iraq War; War in Afghanistan
- Awards: Officer of the Order of Australia; Distinguished Service Cross; Officer of the Legion of Merit (United States)

Major General John Patrick Cantwell (born 9 October 1956) is a retired senior Australian Army officer.

== Early life ==
Cantwell was born in Ipswich, Queensland, on 9 October 1956 to Cecily Mary (née McInnerney) and Daniel Cantwell. He was one of eight children, five of whom went on to serve in the Australian Army. Growing up in Toowoomba, Cantwell was educated at Downlands College and St. Mary's College.

== Military career ==
Cantwell was a member of the Australian Army Cadets prior to joining the Australian Army in 1974 as a regular soldier with the rank of private. He attended officer training at Officer Cadet School, Portsea in 1981, and was commissioned into the Royal Australian Armoured Corps. As a major, Cantwell commanded A Squadron, 4th/7th Royal Dragoon Guards, a British tank squadron as an exchange officer with the British Army in Germany. As a result of that posting, he served in the Gulf War with the Coalition forces in Saudi Arabia, Iraq and Kuwait (1990–1991).

Cantwell was appointed a Member of the Order of Australia in 1989 in recognition of service to the Australian Army as Adjutant of the Armoured Centre.

In August 1996 Cantwell became Commanding Officer and Chief Instructor at the Royal Military College, Duntroon. In January 1999 he took up an appointment as an instructor at the British Joint Services Command and Staff College in the United Kingdom, returning to Australia as the Director of the Force Development Group, Land Warfare Development Centre, on promotion to colonel in December 2000.

Cantwell was promoted to brigadier in January 2003, and appointed Director General of Capability and Plans in Australian Defence Headquarters. Following command of the 1st Brigade (2004–2005), in early 2006 he deployed to Iraq as the Director Strategic Operations, Headquarters Multi National Forces Iraq. He was promoted in the field to the rank of major general on 4 December 2006, the first time in 60 years that an Australian was promoted to major general while on operations. He was promoted by General George W. Casey Jr. and Major General David Fastabend of the United States Army. During this ceremony he was also appointed an Officer of the Legion of Merit. He assumed the appointment of Deputy Chief of Army on 29 January 2007.

Cantwell was advanced to Officer of the Order of Australia in 2007 for distinguished service as the Director of Strategic Operations for the Multi-National Force – Iraq.

In February 2008 Cantwell was selected by Chief of the Defence Force, Air Chief Marshal Angus Houston, to be the senior military member of the team working on a new Defence White Paper, the paramount Australian security and defence policy document commissioned by the Australian government.

Following the Victorian bushfires disaster of 7 February 2009, Cantwell was attached to the Office of the Premier of Victoria as the Interim Head (and, later, Chief of Operations) of the Victorian Bushfires Reconstruction and Recovery Authority, responsible for coordinating all Commonwealth, State and non-government efforts to recover from the effects of the fires.

In 2010 Cantwell served a twelve-month tour as Commander of Australian Forces in the Middle East Area of Operations (Joint Task Force 633). As a result of Cantwell's "inspired leadership, deep commitment to his people and superior performance on operations" in the Middle East, he was awarded a Distinguished Service Cross in the 2012 Australia Day Honours, for distinguished command and leadership in action as the Commander Joint Task Force 633 on Operations SLIPPER and KRUGER. He retired from the Australian Army on 7 February 2012 after 38 years of service.

== Later life ==
Cantwell and his wife Jane, who met while she was also serving in the Australian Army, moved to the Sunshine Coast, Queensland in September 2011 before he announced his retirement from the Australian Army in February 2012.

Cantwell is an occasional television commentator on military affairs and contributes articles to various newspapers and magazines in Australia. He is a nationally recognised advocate for better mental health care for Australian veterans, and is Patron or Ambassador of several organisations promoting veterans' mental health.

Cantwell has published two books: Exit Wounds: One Australian's War on Terror (Melbourne University Press, 2012); and Leadership in Action (Melbourne University Press, 2015).

== Notes ==
Military offices
Preceded by Major General Mark Kelly	Commander Joint Task Force 633; 2010–2011	Succeeded by Major General Angus Campbell
Preceded by Major General Ian Gordon	Deputy Chief of Army; 2007–2008	Succeeded by Major General David Morrison
