= Mark Kelly (Australian general) =

Australian Army officer (born 1956)

Mark Andrew Kelly
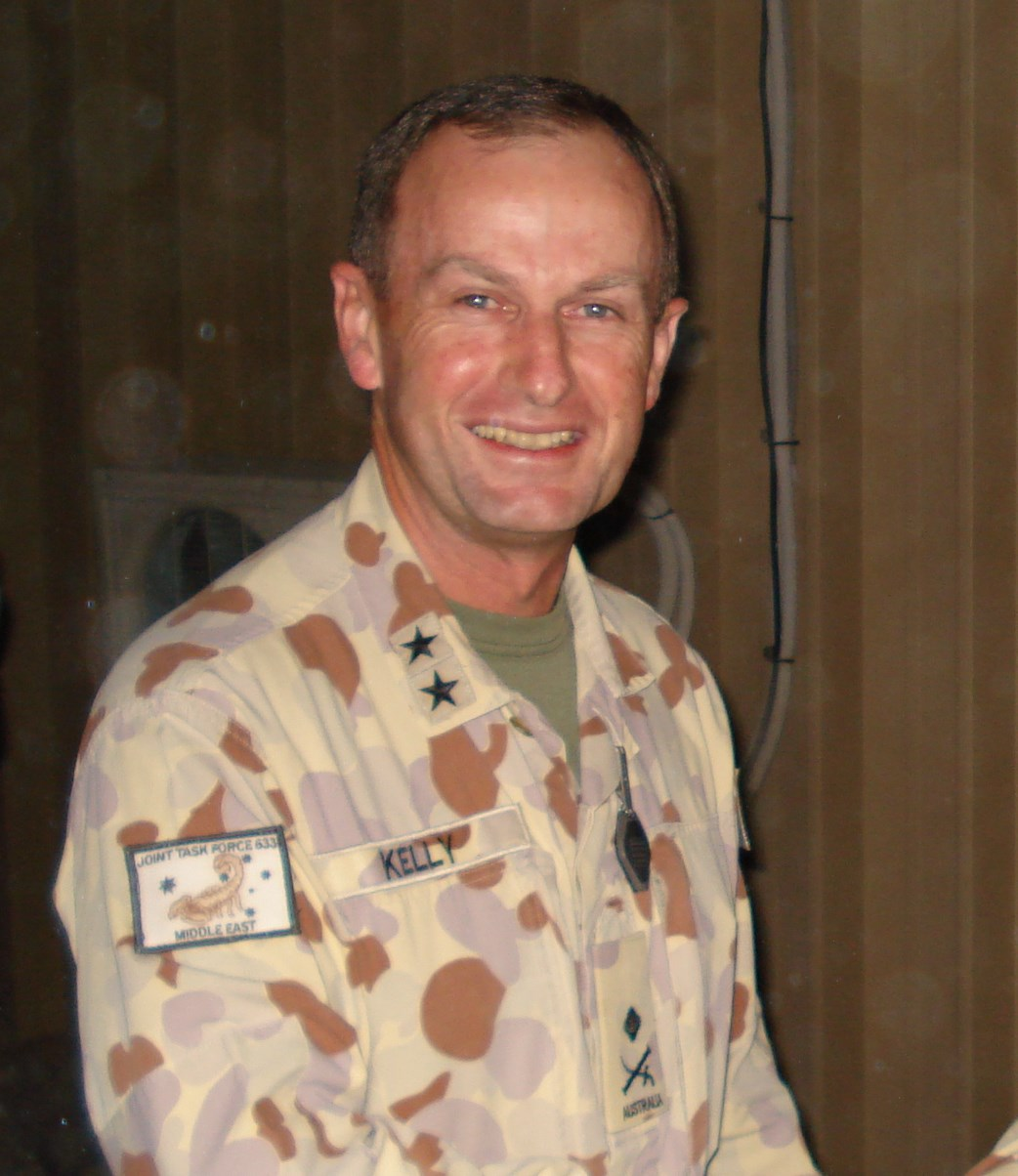
- Kelly at Kandahar in 2009
- Born: 31 October 1956 (age 70); Sydney, New South Wales
- Military career
- Allegiance: Australia
- Branch: Australian Army
- Service years: 1975–2010
- Rank: Major General
- Commands: Joint Task Force 633 (2009–10); Land Command (2005–08); 1st Division (2004–05); 3rd Brigade (2000–02); 1st Battalion, Royal Australian Regiment (1995–97)
- Conflicts: Rhodesia; Commonwealth Monitoring Force; East Timor; International Force East Timor; War in Afghanistan; Operation Enduring Freedom; Operation Slipper; Iraq War; Operation Iraqi Freedom; Operation Catalyst
- Awards: Officer of the Order of Australia; Distinguished Service Cross; Officer of the Legion of Merit (United States)
- Other work: Repatriation Commissioner (2010–19); Colonel Commandant of the Royal Australian Regiment (2011–19)

Major General Mark Andrew Kelly (born 31 October 1956) is a former senior officer in the Australian Army. He served as Commander Joint Task Force 633 commanding all Australian Forces in the Middle East Area of Operations and Afghanistan from 12 January 2009 until 14 January 2010, and as Land Commander Australia from July 2005 to December 2008. He was appointed as the Repatriation Commissioner on 1 July 2010 and served in that role until 30 June 2019.

== Early life ==
Mark Andrew Kelly was born on 31 October 1956 in Sydney, New South Wales, and educated at James Ruse Agricultural High School, graduating in 1974.

== Military career ==
Kelly entered the Royal Military College, Duntroon in January 1975, and graduated in December 1978, receiving the Sword of Honour. In the same year, Kelly received a Bachelor of Arts degree from the University of New South Wales.

Allocated to the Royal Australian Infantry Corps, he was posted to the 5th/7th Battalion, Royal Australian Regiment. Kelly's first operational deployment occurred when he served with the Commonwealth Monitoring Force in Rhodesia during the Independence elections in 1979–80. Kelly served as the exchange instructor at the British Army's School of Infantry at Warminster from September 1985 to November 1987. On promotion to major, he commanded Bravo Company, a rifle Company in the 1st Battalion, Royal Australian Regiment from January 1988 until December 1989. He attended the Army Command and Staff College in 1990 and then served as the Brigade Major of 3rd Brigade from January 1991 until December 1992. He was promoted to lieutenant colonel in January 1993 and served in staff appointments in Army Headquarters until December 1995. He also completed a Master of Arts in Defence Studies from the University of New South Wales in 1995.

From December 1995 to December 1997, Kelly was Commanding Officer of the 1st Battalion, Royal Australian Regiment. He then moved on promotion to colonel to Headquarters 1st Division and the Deployable Joint Force Headquarters (DJFHQ) as the Chief of Staff, a posting that involved deploying the headquarters to East Timor for Operation Stabilise, where he served as the Chief of Staff of INTERFET. Kelly was appointed a Member of the Order of Australia in the Australia Day Honours of 2000 for his "exceptional service to the Australian Army" as CO 1 RAR and COFS 1st Division. He attended the Centre for Defence and Strategic Studies at the Australian Defence College in Canberra in 2000.

Kelly was promoted to brigadier and appointed to command the 3rd Brigade, Ready Deployment Force from December 2000 until December 2002. He was then posted to Headquarters United States Central Command in Tampa, Florida, serving as the first Director of the Combined Planning Group, planning operations for Operation Enduring Freedom in Afghanistan and the Horn of Africa, and Operation Iraqi Freedom in Iraq. He was appointed an Officer of the United States Legion of Merit for his exceptional service in that appointment.

Promoted to major general, Kelly assumed command of the 1st Division and the DJFHQ on 5 July 2004. He then assumed the appointment of Land Commander Australia on 15 July 2005 and served in that role until December 2008. In the Australia Day Honour's List of 2008, Kelly was appointed an Officer of the Order of Australia "for distinguished service to the Australian Army in the fields of training, personnel and operations, in particular as the Commander of the 1st Division and as the Land Commander Australia."

In an official ceremony on 12 January 2009, Kelly succeeded Major General Mike Hindmarsh as Commander Joint Task Force 633 (JTF 633); in this position he commanded all Australian forces in the Middle East Area of Operations and Afghanistan for a period of 12 months. He relinquished command of JTF 633 to Major General John Cantwell on 14 January 2010. Kelly was awarded the Distinguished Service Cross in the 2011 Australia Day Honours List for his "distinguished leadership, exceptional professionalism and unwavering dedication in an extremely ambiguous and dangerous operational environment" as Commander JTF 633. Kelly was transferred to the Army's Standby Reserve on 5 June 2010.

== Post-army ==
On 1 July 2010, Kelly assumed the appointment of Repatriation Commissioner, the Services' Member of the Repatriation Commission and the Military Rehabilitation and Compensation Commission. These commissions supervise the Department of Veterans' Affairs in delivering compensation, health care and support to veterans, serving and former serving personnel of the ADF, widows, children and dependants. He completed his appointment on 30 June 2019 after nine years in that role.

Kelly was appointed as the Colonel Commandant of the Royal Australian Regiment on 1 July 2011 and completed his appointment on 30 June 2019 after eight years in that role.

== Personal ==
Kelly is married to Gabrielle and they have a son, Christopher. He enjoys reading, listening to music and many sports, especially rugby and golf.

== Notes ==
Military offices
Preceded by Major General Brian Howard	Colonel Commandant of the Royal Australian Regiment; 2011–2019	Succeeded by Major General Shane Caughey
Preceded by Major General Mike Hindmarsh	Commander Joint Task Force 633; 2009–2010	Succeeded by Major General John Cantwell
Preceded by Major General Ken Gillespie	Land Commander Australia; 2005–2008	Succeeded by Major General David Morrison
Preceded by Major General Mark Evans	Commander 1st Division; 2004–2005	Succeeded by Major General Ash Power
Preceded by Brigadier Mark Evans	Commander 3rd Brigade; 2000–2002	Succeeded by Brigadier David Morrison
