= Matthew Locke (soldier) =

Australian Medal for Gallantry holder

- Sergeant Matthew Locke
- Born: 16 March 1974; Bellingen, New South Wales, Australia
- Died: 25 October 2007 (aged 33); Tarin Kowt, Orūzgān Province, Afghanistan
- Military career
- Allegiance: Australia
- Branch: Australian Army
- Service years: 1991–2007
- Rank: Sergeant
- Units: 5th/7th Battalion, Royal Australian Regiment; Special Air Service Regiment
- Conflicts: War in Afghanistan; Operation Spin Ghar
- Awards: Medal for Gallantry

Matthew Raymond Locke, MG (16 March 1974 – 25 October 2007) was an Australian soldier and a recipient of the Medal for Gallantry, the third-highest award for wartime bravery in the Australian honours system. During Operation Spin Ghar, with his patrol entrusted with setting up an observation post in Tarin Kowt, Oruzgan province, Afghanistan, the patrol was compromised by militia after a 10-hour foot infiltration up the side of a mountain. Sergeant Locke led a two-man team to neutralise the anti-coalition militia in order to protect the patrol from being overrun, repeatedly exposing himself to intense rifle and machine-gun fire. He was awarded the medal in December 2006. Sergeant Locke was on patrol in October 2007 when he was fatally shot by small arms fire from militia.

== Early life ==
Matthew Locke was born on 16 March 1974 in Bellingen, New South Wales, to Norm and Jan Locke, the youngest of six children in a family of two sisters and four brothers. Locke left school at the age of 15 to work for two years in a sawmill, before enlisting in the army at the age of 17. He instantly developed a passion for soldiering. Two of his brothers had also served in the Australian Defence Force.

== Military career ==
Locke enlisted in the Australian Army on 11 June 1991. He completed Initial Recruit Training at Army Recruit Training Centre, Kapooka, New South Wales and commenced Initial Employment Training on 10 September 1991. Locke was posted to the 5th/7th Battalion, Royal Australian Regiment. He undertook further training while serving in the Royal Australian Infantry Corps, and completed various basic courses and became a Small Arms Coach. In November 1997, Locke completed the Special Air Service Regiment selection course and over the next two years completed 15 specialist programmes ranging from patrolling, demolitions, diving, parachuting, and medical. Locke was subsequently posted to 2 Squadron, Special Air Service Regiment (SASR). In 2004/2005 he was assigned as one of the bodyguards for Major General Jim Molan, who was then Deputy Chief of Staff for Operations in the new Headquarters Multinational Force in Iraq.

== Death ==
Locke was leading a six-man foot patrol in support of Operation Spin Gear clearance of the Chora Valley, as part of Task Force 66 (TF66). As his team was navigating through a river system, the patrol came under fire from insurgents, and he was hit by a single bullet from a PK machine gun. Locke was reported to have died instantly. Due to the green roles nature of the combat patrol, combat body armour was not worn for the mission. Body armour was seen as a hindrance for this particular mission, and due to its design and the location of the attacking force, would not have protected Locke. Locke was evacuated by helicopter, but efforts to revive him were unsuccessful.

A memorial service was held in Perth, Western Australia. It was attended by Prime Minister John Howard and Opposition Leader Kevin Rudd, SASR personnel, and hundreds of mourners, including wife Leigh Locke and son Keegan. Matthew Locke was buried in the Karrakatta Cemetery.

== Honours and awards ==

Sergeant Locke was awarded:

the Medal for Gallantry,
the Australian Active Service Medal, with the Iraq Clasp and the International Coalition Against Terrorism (ICAT) Clasp,
the Afghanistan Campaign Medal,
the Australian Defence Medal,
the United Nations Medal with the United Nations Transitional Administration in East Timor Ribbon (UNTAET),
the Infantry Combat Badge and
the Returned from Active Service Badge.

== Legacy ==
In 2009, a bridge named "Sgt Matthew Locke MG Bridge" was unveiled in the Bellingen Shire by Locke's son Keegan, just north of Raleigh, New South Wales; relatives and Special Operations Commander Australia Major General Tim McOwan were present at the unveiling.

Since the death of Locke, a rugby league charity match has been run every year in memory of him. The match is between the Bellingen Magpies and the Australian Army Rugby Team; funds raised from the charity event go towards Legacy Australia and The Grub Club.
