= Medal for Gallantry =

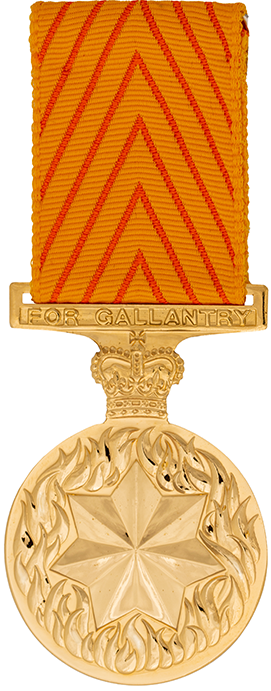
- Obverse of medal and ribbon
- Type: Medal
- Awarded for: "acts of gallantry in action in hazardous circumstances"
- Presented by: Governor-General of Australia
- Eligibility: Members of the Australian Defence Force
- Post-nominals: MG
- Status: Currently awarded
- Established: 15 January 1991
- First award: 1996
- Final award: 14 February 2026

Highlights
- Total: 87

Order of Wear
- Next (higher): Nursing Service Cross
- Next (lower): Bravery Medal
- Related: Star of Gallantry

The Medal for Gallantry (MG) is a military decoration awarded to personnel of the Australian Defence Force. It recognises acts of gallantry in action in hazardous circumstances. The MG was introduced on 15 January 1991, replacing the imperial equivalent. It is ranked third in the Gallantry Decorations in the Australian Honours System. Recipients of the Medal of Gallantry are entitled to use the post-nominal letters "MG".

== Description ==
- The Medal for Gallantry is circular and is made of gold-plated silver. It is ensigned with the Crown of Saint Edward. The obverse bears a Federation Star, which is superimposed on a circle of flames. This image represents action under fire.
- The reverse shows a horizontal panel superimposed on a design of fluted rays.
- The Medal for Gallantry is suspended from a 32 millimetre-wide ribbon by a narrow gold-plated silver suspender bar. The ribbon has a design of chevrons of light orange alternating with chevrons of deep orange angled at 60 degrees. The chevron pattern is placed as a stylised "A" with the points facing upwards.

== Decoration allowance ==
Veterans who are paid disability pension under the Veterans Entitlements Act 1986 (the Act), and who have been awarded a gallantry award specified in the Act, including the Medal for Gallantry, are also paid a decoration allowance. In May 2011, the allowance was A$2.10 per fortnight.

== Notable recipients ==
- Signalman Martin "Jock" Wallace MG, formerly of the 152 Signal Squadron and the Special Air Service Regiment. Awarded 27 November 2002 for actions in Afghanistan on 2 March 2002.
- Sergeant "C" (Matthew Locke MG of the Special Air Service Regiment) was subsequently killed in action in 2007.
- Lance Corporal "E" is now known as Corporal Ben Roberts-Smith VC MG of the Special Air Service Regiment. He was awarded the MG for actions in the period May–September 2006 in Afghanistan, and was subsequently awarded the Victoria Cross for Australia.
- Corporal "B", (later identified as Sergeant Brett Wood MG), of the 2nd Commando Regiment was subsequently killed in action on 23 May 2011.

== List of recipients ==
#	Name	Rank	Date awarded	Citation	Notes
	Frank Alcorta	Sergeant	2 November 2016	For acts of gallantry in hazardous circumstances as platoon sergeant of 2 Platoon, A Company, the 6th Battalion, the Royal Australian Regiment, during the Battle of Long Tan, Phuoc Tuy Province, Vietnam on 18 August 1966.	
05	Thomas Henry Arrowsmith	Captain	3 June 1998	(Vietnam)	
	Ryan James Avery	Corporal	11 June 2012	For acts of gallantry in action in hazardous circumstances on 4 December 2010 while a sniper team member in Mentoring Task Force - Two on Operation SLIPPER in Afghanistan.	
	B (Brett Wood)	Corporal	13 June 2011	For acts of gallantry in action in hazardous circumstances on Operation SLIPPER in Afghanistan in 2008 (sic - the actions were in 2006).	
	B	Corporal	26 January 2013	For acts of gallantry in action in hazardous circumstances.	
	Cameron Baird	Corporal	26 January 2009	For his conduct during a close quarters combat in Afghanistan during Operation SLIPPER in November 2007	
04	Graeme Eric Bolitho	Second Lieutenant	3 June 1998	(Vietnam)	
06	James Raymond Bourke	Captain	3 June 1998	(Vietnam)	
17	John Douglas Campbell Burridge	Corporal	1 December 1999	(Vietnam)	
18	Trevor William Byng	Corporal	1 December 1999	(Vietnam)	
	C	Lance Corporal	2 December 2006	For gallantry as a Patrol Medic during the treatment and evacuation of a wounded Australian soldier in the Special Forces Task Group, whilst deployed on Operation SLIPPER, Afghanistan in 2006.	
25	C (Matthew Locke)	Sergeant	2 December 2006	For gallantry in action in hazardous circumstances as the second-in-command of a Special Air Service Regiment patrol in the Special Forces Task Group whilst deployed on Operation Slipper, Afghanistan, in 2006.	
	C	Sergeant	10 June 2013	For acts of gallantry in action in hazardous circumstances as a team commander, Special Operations Task Group on Operation SLIPPER in Afghanistan.	
	C	Corporal	8 June 2015	For acts of gallantry in action in hazardous circumstances on Operation SLIPPER, in Afghanistan in 2012.	
	Daniel Sebastian Cash	Major	26 January 2008	For acts of gallantry in action in hazardous circumstances during operations against Taliban and Anti Coalition Militia while deployed on Operation SLIPPER in Afghanistan, from June to October 2006.	
19	Frank Carr Cashmore	Sergeant	1 December 1999	(Vietnam)	
20	Kevin George Casson	Private	1 December 1999	(Vietnam)	
	Garry John Chad	Sergeant	14 February 2026	For acts of gallantry in action in hazardous circumstances with 7 Platoon, 4th Battalion, The Royal Australian Regiment in Long Khanh Province in Vietnam on 29 July 1971.	
	Michael Patrick Chalk	Corporal	26 January 2014	For acts of gallantry in action in hazardous circumstances while an Engineer Search Commander in the Tangi Valley, Afghanistan, on 10 March 2012.	
	Brendan Michael Clarke	Lance Corporal	13 June 2011	For acts of gallantry in action in hazardous circumstances while a rifleman with Team Three, Mentoring Team C, Mentoring Task Force 1, in the Central Baluchi Valley, Afghanistan on 15 March and 8 July 2010.	
21	Brian John Collett	Sergeant	1 December 1999	(Vietnam)	
	David William Cox	Private	26 January 2010	For gallantry in action in hazardous circumstances while a rifleman and combat first aider in Mentoring and Reconstruction Task Force 1 at Kakarak, Afghanistan on 16 March 2009.	
	D	Sergeant	26 January 2012	For acts of gallantry in action in hazardous circumstances.	
	Blaine Flower Diddams	Sergeant	10 June 2013	For acts of gallantry in action in hazardous circumstances as a patrol commander, Special Operations Task Group Rotation XVII on Operation SLIPPER in Afghanistan on 2 July 2012.	
	Kevin Bede Dolan	Warrant Officer Class Two	13 June 2011	For acts of gallantry in action in hazardous circumstances while a joint terminal attack controller for Mentoring Team A, Mentoring Task Force 1, at Sorkh Lez in the Mirabad Valley, Afghanistan on 2 July 2010.	
26	E (Ben Roberts-Smith)	Lance Corporal	2 December 2006	For gallantry in action in hazardous circumstances as a patrol sniper in the Special Operations Task Group – Task Force 637, whilst deployed on Operation SLIPPER Rotation Three Afghanistan, May – September 2006.	
27	F	Trooper	2 December 2006	For gallantry in action in extremely hazardous conditions, as a patrol member in the Special Forces Task Group whilst deployed on Operation SLIPPER, Afghanistan in 2006.	
07	Paul Ellis Green	Captain	3 June 1998	(Vietnam)	
22	Daniel John Handley	Trooper	1 December 1999	(Vietnam)	
08	John Boyd Healy	Major	3 June 1998	(Vietnam)	
09	William Francis Hindson, MC	Lieutenant	3 June 1998	(Vietnam)	
	Jeremy Thomas Holder	Corporal	26 January 2008	For an act of gallantry in action in hazardous circumstances as a Medical Assistant within the Special Operations Task Group - Task Force 637, while deployed on Operation.	
	Justin Wayne Huggett	Corporal	8 June 2009	For acts of gallantry in action in hazardous circumstances while deployed in Afghanistan with the 1st Battalion, The Grenadier Guards Battle Group during Exercise LONG LOOK 2007.	
	J	Corporal	26 January 2013	For acts of gallantry in action in hazardous circumstances on Operation SLIPPER in Afghanistan, June 2010.	
	J	Sergeant	26 January 2014	For acts of gallantry in action in hazardous circumstances as an explosive ordnance disposal technician with the Special Operations Task Group on Operation SLIPPER.	
	Alan James Parr	Private	23 May 2023	For acts of gallantry in action in hazardous circumstances as the radio operator in the 1st Battalion, the Royal Australian Regiment's mortar line during the Battle for Fire Support Base Coral in Vietnam on 13 May 1968.	
	K	Private	26 January 2012	For acts of gallantry in action in hazardous circumstances.	
	Geoff Kendall	Second Lieutenant	18 August 2008	For actions during the Vietnam War.	
	Paul Bjorn Langer	Private	26 January 2012	For acts of gallantry in action in hazardous circumstances on 24 August 2010 while a rifleman with Mentoring Team Delta, the 1st Mentoring Task Force at Derapet, Tangi Valley, Afghanistan.	
	Sean Anthony Lanigan	Sergeant	26 January 2012	For acts of gallantry in action in hazardous circumstances on 24 August 2010 while a platoon sergeant and mentor with Mentoring Team Delta, the 1st Mentoring Task Force at Derapet, Tangi Valley, Afghanistan.	
	John Matthew Lines	Warrant Officer Class Two	26 January 2010	For gallantry in action in hazardous circumstances while acting as an Operational Mentoring and Liaison Team member at Kakarak, Afghanistan on 4 January 2009.	
	M	Lance Corporal	26 January 2015	For acts of gallantry in hazardous circumstances on Operation SLIPPER.	
	Barry Eugene Magnussen	Lance Corporal	2 November 2016	For acts of gallantry in hazardous circumstances as member of 4 Section, 11 Platoon, D Company, 6th Battalion, the Royal Australian Regiment, during the Battle of Long Tan, Phuoc Tuy Province, Vietnam on 18 August 1966.	
10	William McDonald	Major	3 June 1998	(Vietnam)	
11	Ian David McFarlane	Major	3 June 1998	(Vietnam)	
01	Andrew Colin Miller	Corporal	25 November 1996	Awarded for actions in 1995 whilst serving with UNAMIR in Rwanda.	
	N	Corporal	26 January 2013	For acts of gallantry in action in hazardous circumstances.	
	Norman Ted Nye	Driver	14 February 2026	For acts of gallantry in action in hazardous circumstances as a tank driver from 2/6th Armoured Regiment in World War II at Buna, New Guinea on 24 December 1942.	
	John Patrick O’Halloran	Second Lieutenant	8 August 2025	For acts of gallantry in action in hazardous circumstances as the Platoon Commander, 5 Platoon, Bravo Company, 6th Battalion, the Royal Australian Regiment during Operation BRIBIE, South Vietnam on 17 February 1967.	
23	Steven Oddy	Sergeant	25 March 2000	For gallantry on 16 October 1999 while leading a patrol in the vicinity of Aidabasalaia, East Timor, during Operation WARDEN.	
12	Christopher John Gilbert Peacock	Captain	3 June 1998	(Vietnam)	
	Russell Bradburn Pollack	Sergeant	25 October 2023	For acts of gallantry in action in hazardous circumstances on 22 July 1942 as the plane navigator of Lockheed Hudson A16-201.	
	Francis Adrian Roberts	Lieutenant	2 November 2016	For acts of gallantry in hazardous circumstances as Commander 3 Troop, 1 Armoured Personnel Carrier Squadron, during the Battle of Long Tan, Phuoc Tuy Province, Vietnam on 18 August 1966.	
	David Steven Robertson	Bombardier	11 June 2012	For acts of gallantry in action in hazardous circumstances on 20 March 2011 while a joint fires observer in Mentoring Task Force - Two on Operation SLIPPER in Afghanistan.	
	S	Trooper	26 January 2009	For acts of gallantry in action in hazardous circumstances in Afghanistan as part of the Special Operations Task Group during Operation SLIPPER, Oruzgan Province, Afghanistan.	
	David R Sabben	Second Lieutenant	18 August 2008	For actions during the Vietnam War.	
02	Rodrick Malcolm Scott	Warrant Officer Class Two	25 November 1996	Awarded for actions in 1995 whilst serving with UNAMIR in Rwanda.	
	Laurie Edwin Sheard	Sergeant	25 October 2023	For acts of gallantry in action in hazardous circumstances on 22 July 1942 as the aircraft gunner of Lockheed Hudson A16-201	
13	Peter Andrew Sibree	Captain	3 June 1998	(Vietnam)	
	Benjamin James Sime	Petty Officer	26 January 2009	For acts of gallantry in action in hazardous circumstances during a waterborne terrorist attack in the North Persian Gulf, Iraq, during Operation CATALYST.	
14	Bevan John Smith	Captain	3 June 1998	(Vietnam)	
	Gavin Ronald Stevens	Chief Petty Officer	31 January 2024	For acts of gallantry in action in hazardous circumstances as a commander, Tactical Explosive Ordnance Disposal patrol from Australian Clearance Diving Team Three on Operation FALCONER in Al Faw Peninsula, Iraq on 16 April 2003.	
15	Brian John Sullivan, MC	Second Lieutenant	3 June 1998	(Vietnam)	
	Ronald James Swanton	Warrant Officer Class Two	2 September 2024	For gallantry in action in hazardous circumstances on 13 November 1965 during a battle in the Tra Bong valley of Vietnam as an assistant advisor to the Army of the Republic of Vietnam.	
	T	Private	11 June 2012	For acts of gallantry in action in hazardous circumstances while deployed on Operation SLIPPER.	
	Giancarlos Brasil Taraborrelli	Corporal	26 January 2010	For gallantry in action in hazardous circumstances while an Operational Mentoring and Liaison Team member at Kakarak, Afghanistan on 16 March 2009.	
	David Reid Taylor	Pilot Officer	25 October 2023	For acts of gallantry in action in hazardous circumstances on 22 July 1942 as the plane wireless operator of Lockheed Hudson A16-201.	
03	Thomas Steven Tilbrook	Lieutenant	25 November 1996	Awarded for actions in 1995 whilst serving with UNAMIR in Rwanda.	
04	Carol Louise Vaughan-Evans	Major	25 November 1996	For distinguished service, particularly in response to the massacre of civilian refugees at Kibeho on 22 April 1995 whilst serving with UNAMIR II in Rwanda.	
24	Martin Wallace	Signalman	27 November 2002	Wallace was awarded the Medal for Gallantry for his efforts on 2 March 2002, during Operation Anaconda, while attached to the United States 10th Mountain Division in the Shahi Kot Valley, Afghanistan.	
	Kevin Arthur Wheatley, VC	Warrant Officer Class Two	2 September 2024	For acts of gallantry in action in hazardous circumstances on 28 May and 18 August 1965 as an advisor and assistant advisor to the Army of the Republic of Vietnam.	
16	Clive Owen Gestern Williams	Second Lieutenant	3 June 1998	(Vietnam)	
	X	Trooper	18 May 2003	For acts of gallantry in action in hazardous circumstances in Iraq while on Operation FALCONER.	

== Number awarded ==
In March 2018, only 55 of the recipients were listed on the "It's an Honour" website. A further 8 recipients have been identified from official publications of the Governor General, the Department of Defence and from special issues of the Australian Government Gazette.

Many of the awards have been presented at the official Australia Day ceremonies - held on 26 January - and Queen's Birthday ceremonies - held on the 2nd Monday in June.

	Honours Lists		Special Lists			Other Sources		It's an Honour			
Year	Australia Day	Queen's Birthday	Other dates					AD	QB	Other	Total
2018	-										0
2017	-	-	-	-							0
2016	-	-	3	2 Nov 2016						3	3
2015	1	1	-	-				1	1		2
2014	2	-	-	-				2			2
2013	3	2	-	-				3	2		5
2012	4	3	-	-				4	3		7
2011	-	3	-	-					3		3
2010	3	-	-	-				3			3
2009	2	1	-	-		1		2	1		3
2008	2	-	2	18 Aug 2008				2		2	4
2006	-	-	3	2 Dec 2006							0
2003	-	-	1	18 May 2003							0
2002	-	-	1	27 Nov 2002							0
2000	-	-	1	25 March 2000						1	1
1999	-	-	6	1 Dec 1999						6	6
1998	-	-	13	3 Jun 1998						13	13
1996	-	-	3	25 Nov 1996		1				3	3
Totals	17	10	33	Sub-Total	60	2	62	17	10	28	55

== See also ==
- Australian Honours Order of Precedence
