= Distinguished Service Cross (Australia) =

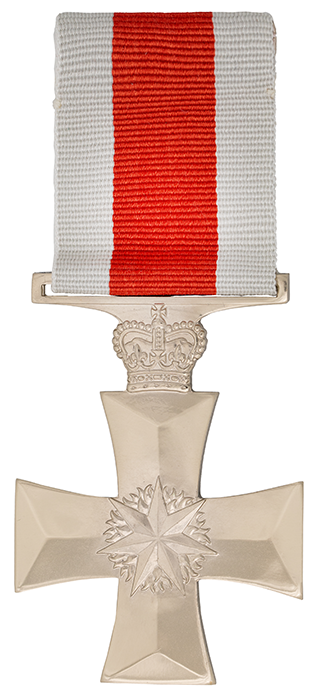
- Type: Medal
- Awarded for: Distinguished command and leadership in warlike operations
- Presented by: Governor-General of Australia
- Eligibility: Members of the Australian Defence Force
- Post-nominals: DSC
- Status: Currently awarded
- Established: 1991
- First award: 1993
- Final award: 2025 Australia Day Honours

Highlights
- Total: 272
- Total awarded posthumously: 1
- Total recipients: 273
- Undress ribbon for DSC w/Bar

Order of Wear
- Next (higher): Star of Courage
- Next (lower): Member of the Order of Australia
- Related: Distinguished Service Medal; Commendation for Distinguished Service

The Distinguished Service Cross (DSC) is a military decoration awarded to personnel of the Australian Defence Force. It is awarded for distinguished command and leadership in warlike operations. They are awarded by the governor-general of Australia on the advice of the minister for Defence. The DSC was introduced in 1991 and is the highest distinguished service decoration in the Australian Honours System. Recipients of the Distinguished Service Cross are entitled to use the post-nominal letters "DSC". Since its inception 273 awards have been made—which includes eight bars and one second bar.

== Government allowance ==
The Government of Australia may grant an allowance to veterans or serving members of the Australian Defence Force who have been awarded the Distinguished Service Cross, or other awards for gallantry. In November 2007, this allowance was A$2.10 per fortnight.

== Description ==
The Distinguished Service Cross is described as: "...a modified Maltese Cross of nickel silver ensigned with the Crown of St Edward. The obverse bears a Federation Star surmounted on a disc of flames. The medal has a nickel-silver suspender bar. The medal ribbon has a central ochre-red stripe surrounded by narrower silver-blue stripes."

== Distinct recipients ==
Since its inception, eight bars have been awarded;

One bar

- Colonel V, DSC & Bar – Citation: For distinguished command and leadership in action as a commanding officer on Operation Slipper in Afghanistan in June 2009.
- Lieutenant Colonel P, DSC & Bar – Citation: For distinguished command and leadership in action.
- Major General Michael Peter Crane, DSC & Bar, AM – Citation: distinguished command and leadership in warlike operations as the Commander of Joint Task Force 633 on Operation Slipper from October 2012 to September 2013.
- Lieutenant Colonel F, DSC & Bar – Citation: For distinguished command and leadership in warlike operations during Operation SLIPPER.
- Brigadier Daniel Fortune, DSC & Bar – Citation: for distinguished command and leadership in warlike operations on Operation Slipper.
- Brigadier John William Shanahan, DSC & Bar, AM, OBE – Citation: For distinguished command and leadership in warlike operations as the North Atlantic Treaty Organisation Resolute Support Headquarters Chief of Operations and as Commanding General Train Advise Assist Command – South in Afghanistan from September 2017 to February 2019.

Two bars

- Lieutenant Colonel Ian Langford, DSC & Two Bars. Originally reported as "Lieutenant Colonel I" due to Special Forces protocols for name suppression. First citation: For distinguished command and leadership in warlike operations as Commanding Officer of Special Operations Task Group on Operation Slipper. Second Citation: For distinguished leadership in warlike operations as part of a Special Operations Force on Operation OKRA from September 2014 to February 2015.

== Controversy ==
On 3 July 2024, a senate inquiry was launched to investigate the award criteria for the Distinguished Service Cross including the 2011 change from “in action” to “in warlike operations”. In August 2026, The Australian reported that the Department of Foreign Affairs and Trade had ceased using the Distinguished Service Cross post-nominal “DSC” in Angus Campbells official diplomatic biography. The reference to his Distinguished Service Cross was subsequently removed from his official DFAT profile, although Campbell retained the decoration.

== See also ==
- Australian Honours Order of Precedence
- List of recipients of the Distinguished Service Cross
- Category:Recipients of the Distinguished Service Cross (Australia)
