= Afghanistan Medal (Australia) =

- Obverse (left), reverse (right) and ribbon of medal
- Type: Campaign Medal
- Awarded for: Service on Operation Slipper and Palate
- Presented by: Australia
- Eligibility: Australian Defence Force personnel in the Afghanistan region from 11 October 2001
- Campaign: War in Afghanistan
- Status: Closed
- Established: 30 September 2004

Highlights
- Total: 34,500

Order of Wear
- Next (higher): International Force East Timor Medal
- Next (lower): Iraq Medal
- Related: Australian Active Service Medal; NATO Medal for ISAF

The Afghanistan Medal was instituted by Queen Elizabeth II, Queen of Australia on the advice of the Australian Prime Minister John Howard in 2004. It is awarded to Australian defence force personnel who served in or around Afghanistan after 11 October 2001. Defence force personnel are also recognised by the 'ICAT' clasp to the Australian Active Service Medal and the North Atlantic Treaty Organisation's Non-Article 5 Medal with 'ISAF' clasp.

== Eligibility ==
Members of the Australian Defence Force who render 30 days service (or 30 sorties) with the forces known as:

- Operation Slipper — the ADF contribution to the International Coalition Against Terrorism that:
  - commenced on 11 October 2001 in the specified areas comprising the total land areas and superjacent airspace boundaries of Afghanistan;
  - commenced on 11 October 2001 and ended on 5 December 2002 in the specified areas comprising the total land areas and superjacent airspace boundaries of Kyrgyzstan;
  - the specified areas comprising the total land areas, territorial waters inland waterways and superjacent airspace boundaries of Kuwait, Bahrain, Qatar, United Arab Emirates, the Persian Gulf, the Strait of Hormuz, the Gulf of Oman, those portions of the Arabian Sea bounded by 68 degrees east and 12 degrees north, and the Gulf of Aden; that;
    - commenced on 11 October 2001 and ended on 5 December 2002, and
    - commenced on 1 January 2009;
- Operation Palate – the Australian Defence Force contribution to the United Nations Assistance Mission in Afghanistan that commenced on 6 December 2002 in the area comprising the specified total land areas and superjacent airspace boundaries of Afghanistan.
- A person is not eligible for the award of the Afghanistan Medal where an entitlement exists to the Iraq Medal for the same deployment.

== Debate About Awarding the Afghanistan medal for 2015 to 2021 ==
- There has been discussions amongst ADF veterans and serving members, that the eligibility for the Afghanistan Medal should continue up until the fall of Afghanistan in 2021, along with the AASM with clasp ICAT.

== Description ==
- The Afghanistan Medal is a cupro-nickel circular medal. The obverse features the Commonwealth Coat of Arms.
- The reverse of medal shows a snow-capped mountain range with a multi-rayed sun rising behind the mountains. The mountains represent the dominant terrain of the country and the rising sun signifies a 'new dawn' for the nation. The word 'AFGHANISTAN' is inscribed in English and in the Arabic script of the two dominant languages of Afghanistan, Dari and Pashto.
- The medal ribbon has a central vertical stripe of red, signifying the conflict in Afghanistan. This is flanked by stripes of purple representing the three arms of the Australian Defence Force. Stripes of khaki, white and light blue border the inner stripes. They symbolise the Afghanistan terrain, the snow-peaked mountains and the sky above, respectively.

== See also ==
- Australian Honours Order of Precedence
- Australian campaign medals
