= Don Lane (politician) =

Australian politician (1935–1995)

Member of the Queensland Legislative Assembly for Merthyr
- In office 24 July 1971 – 13 May 1989
- Preceded by: Ray Ramsden
- Succeeded by: Santo Santoro

Personal details
- Born: Donald Frederick Lane; 18 July 1935 Toowoomba, Queensland, Australia
- Died: 11 March 1995 (aged 59)
- Resting place: Pinnaroo Cemetery
- Party: National Party
- Other political affiliations: Liberal Party, Independent
- Occupation: Police Officer

Donald Frederick Lane (18 July 1935 – 11 March 1995) was a Minister of Transport in the Bjelke-Petersen state of Queensland's coalition government. A former policeman in the Special Branch, in 1971 he was elected as the Liberal member for Merthyr, an electorate which included the Fortitude Valley where a lot of the then illegal brothels and casinos were located. During his time with the Police, he had gotten to know Jack Herbert the Chief Organiser of The Joke, and the "Rat Pack" of Terry Lewis, Tony Murphy and Glenn Hallahan well. Following the 1983 Queensland state election he switched to the National Party (along with Brian Austin), providing it with an outright majority, and was rewarded with a ministry. He went on to lead the National Party's submission to the Electoral Commission to more effectively gerrymander and malapportion seats to increase National Party control. It was revealed in the Fitzgerald Inquiry, that Lane had significant unexplained income, and was alleged by Jack Herbert to have taken bribes. Lane did not admit to taking bribes, instead he admitted to abusing Ministerial expenses and claimed a lot of other Ministers had done the same. In the end Lane and three other Bjelke-Petersen ministers (Leisha Harvey, Brian Austin, and Geoff Muntz) were tried in the District Court and sentenced to twelve months imprisonment for falsifying their expense accounts.

== Police career (1952–1971) ==
Don Lane spent 19 years in the Queensland Police Force, the first 10 years in Cloncurry and Mt Isa, and the last 9 years in Brisbane.

=== Early career ===
On 11 February 1952, a 16-year-old Lane joined the Police Force as a cadet (a week ahead of Glen Hallahan, one of the so called "Rat Pack" who joined 18 February 1952), and became a constable on 31 January 1955. After a few months in Roma St, Lane was then posted to Cloncurry in 1957 under then Inspector Norm Bauer (a future police commissioner), as part of the 12-strong police force at Cloncurry. After a while Lane decided he wanted to become a detective, and was assisted when Sergeant Don Becker arrived in Cloncurry-who had a reputation as one of the best "white-collar crime" investigators in the force, but had been transferred to Cloncurry after stoushes with senior police. Becker immediately enraged Bauer by closing down illegal SP bookmaking operations and confiscating the betting ledgers. The corrupt Bauer put a lot of pressure on Becker and Lane but failed to stop the bookmakers being charged.

Lane spent two and a half years in the four-officer Mt Isa CIB team as a detective, replacing Glen Hallahan when he was transferred to Brisbane CIB. Hallahan when he was in Mt Isa CIB handled about 80% of the Cloncurry cases and Lane got to know him well, although Hallahan was considered a loner.

In 1958, when Frank Bischoff became Commissioner, he did a Statewide tour and after a visit to Mt Isa, he quickly brought Bauer to Brisbane to take charge of the Licensing Branch, and he moved Hallahan to CIB.

=== Brisbane CIB ===
In 1962, Lane was transferred from Mt Isa to Brisbane CIB, where he spent the first 5 years in Consorting Squad.

=== Lane's close ties to the "Rat Pack" ===
When Lane arrived in Brisbane, Hallahan ensured that he would be given a job with the Consorting Squad, where served with both Hallahan and Tony Murphy. The "Rat Pack" consisted of Terry Lewis, Tony Murphy and Glenn Hallahan. On 16 December 1958, Lewis recorded being on duty with Murphy and Hallahan in Police Car no 12, the "Rat Pack was born". In conjunction with Jack Herbert, the Rat Pack would be instrumental in establishing "The Joke". Later when Lane moved to the Special Branch, he was located in the Special Branch office which was directly adjacent to where Lewis worked in Juvenile Aid Bureau, and he would see Lewis in passing on most days. In his autobiography, Lane admits that during the Special Branch years, that he often went for drinks with Terry Lewis and Jack Herbert after work, showing his close ties with all the key players in "The Joke"

=== Special Branch ===
In January 1967, Lane transferred to the Special Branch. Soon after Herbert joined the Licensing Branch it moved to the 4th Floor of the Police Headquarters, next to the Special Branch. One day Herbert was approached by Don Lane and bribed a small amount each week to avoid raiding a pub for trading on a Sunday (then illegal). That was how the relationship between Herbert and Shady Lane began, but later on, it quickly changed to Herbert paying Lane.

== Political career (1971–1989) ==
On 29 March, the Reverend Sam Ramsden (1913-1986) the incumbent Liberal Party member for Merthyr announced that he would resign on 30 June. Ramsden had significant health problems and had part of his lungs removed.

=== Member for Merthyr ===
Still only a Senior Constable after 19 years in the Queensland Police force, on 24 July 1971, Don Lane entered parliament as the Liberal Member for Merthyr, which included the Fortitude Valley area.

With Merthyr having a large population of Italian Australians, Lane was fanatical about ensuring he had their support, and used his influence to get jobs for the locals in the State Government. Lane lobbied hard for Commissioner Terry Lewis to transfer Special Branch Detective Mick Cacciola, to Rockhampton because Cacciola was about to become President of the Italo-Australian club, and had previously pushed a motion for the club to stay out of politics, after complaints about Lane using the club to promote the Liberal Party. Lane on the other hand wanted the club to actively support him, and to avoid a transfer to Rockhampton, Cacciola had to withdraw his nomination.

=== Plot against Commissioner Whitrod ===
Police Officer Vincent Murphy (who was also on the Police Union Executive), was originally a critic of Ray Whitrod, but had been put in charge of a squad in Fortitude Valley called the Marauders, who had been set a task to clean up the number of assaults and road accidents in the Valley. Murphy later sent Whitrod a letter noting that sometime in 1972, when he was operating a one man patrol in the Hamilton area, he drove along Langside Road and noticed Don Lane in the back yard. Lane motioned Murphy over, saying he wanted to talk. Lane asked Vince whether he would join a small group of people including himself, Terry Lewis, and Tony Murphy to get rid of Ray Whitrod. Vince said no he would not, and Lane abruptly stopped the conversation.

In 1970, when Whitrod became Commissioner, he got all the major factions offside immediately. He gave a speech to the legal fraternity saying he would prefer to hire all new police, enraging both the police unions and the media savvy Criminal Investigations Branch. He also enraged the Catholic Officers when, in his weekly update he included sermons preaching against aspects of the Catholic faith. Whitrod also announced that he transferred Special Branch Chief Leo De Lange after 20 years in charge of the branch, and that he was breaking the branch up, which provoked the Government to override the decision and maintain the Special Branch. Whitrod had been furious that the Premier was being fed info from the Special Branch, specifically by Don Lane (who denied any specific contact with the Premier).

=== Minister for Transport ===
Lane was made Minister for Transport in December 1980, and served for the next 7 years in that portfolio.

=== The Coalition Split ===
In 1983 Llew Edwards was leader of the Queensland Liberal Party and Deputy Premier. The Liberal Party was increasingly becoming divided between the Ginger Group which opposed the Government on a number of issues and wanted to be the senior coalition partner and those content with the status quo. Increasingly new Liberal Party members being elected were less conservative; indeed, most of the members of the Ginger Group were "small-l liberals." On 9 October 1978, this (combined with a failure to win many seats in the last election) had resulted in Sir William Knox being deposed as leader and replaced by Edwards. This stoush, and the increasing number of three-cornered contests in the 1977 election had attracted the ire of the National Party in the 1980 election, where they had engaged in three-cornered contests in three seats to defeat Bruce Bishop (Surfers Paradise), Peter White (Southport), and Tony Bourke (Lockyer). Bishop and White had been particularly open in their hostility to the National Party, and to alleged corruption by Russ Hinze on the Gold Coast. Three incidents in 1981 had further damaged relations between the Nationals and many Liberals, with the Liberal representation in Cabinet reduced from 8 to 7, the appointment of John's friend Ted Lyons to the Chairmanship of the TAB board, and the appointment of the new Chief Justice.

In December 1981, Ginger Group member Angus Innes had narrowly lost a challenge to Edwards 12-10, that was seen as a reasonable indicator in how many Ginger Group members there were at the time. Growing friction had resulted in two long standing conservative members Bob Moore (Windsor) and Bill Kaus (Mansfield) losing pre-selection for the upcoming 1983 election, with both as a result winning National Party preselection instead.

Matters came to a head on 4 August 1983 when Welfare Minister Terry White joined his Ginger Group colleagues in crossing the floor of parliament over the establishment of a public accounts committee, which had been a longstanding demand. White claimed that since there was no stated government policy on the matter, he was not bound by cabinet solidarity to vote against it. Bjelke-Petersen was furious, and Edwards quickly sacked White from his cabinet portfolio over the affair.

Lane was furious with White over his actions, noting that he had given no notice of what was clearly a political ambush, despite the fact the Liberal Ministers had agreed to work closely, and that it was a poor reward for Edwards previously sacking three Ministers (Norm Lee, John Greenwood, and Bill Lickis) to allow for White, Lane and Austin to enter Cabinet.

White, in turn, challenged Edwards for leadership of the party, which he managed to secure with the assistance of the other Ginger Group members. Angus Innes was at the same time elected deputy leader. However, Bjelke-Petersen refused to appoint White as Deputy Premier, a post normally held by the Liberal leader. In response, White dissolved the coalition agreement and moved the Liberals to the crossbenches.

Despite the likely loss of a majority with the end of the Coalition, Bjelke-Petersen advised the Governor, James Ramsay, to adjourn parliament, allowing him to stay in power at the head of a minority government until the election without having to face any confidence motions from White.

=== 1983 Queensland State Election ===
For the 1983 Queensland State Election, Bjelke-Petersen was determined to win power for the National Party outright. In the subsequent 1983 election, Bjelke-Petersen called for right-leaning Liberal voters to support the Nationals, suggesting that under White, the Liberals might throw their support to Labor. The election was an unmitigated disaster for the Liberals, who suffered a 14-seat loss. Significantly, from the Ginger Group, only White and Innes survived, with the media and supporters blaming them for the debacle.

Of the 14 seats, seven were lost to the Labor Party, and seven to the National Party. Bill Kaus, who lost Liberal preselection for his seat of Mansfield, won the seat as a National Party member. Bob Moore similarly dis-endorsed for Windsor, got National Party preselection, but both parties lost the seat to Labor, with Pat Comben winning the seat. With Edwards deciding to retire after losing the leadership, the open seat of Ipswich was won by David Hamill. Five other seats were won by Labor, with future Premier Wayne Goss entering parliament by winning Salisbury. Dr Denis Murphy won Stafford, although his untimely death in 1984, saw Ginger Group Liberal Party member Terry Gygar return. This resulted in an increase in the more liberal urban voters to the Labor Party and conservative urban voters to the National Party, creating a more stark political divide.

With the disastrous electoral results, Lane called for the resignations of both Terry White and John Herron (Liberal Party State President), who both refused.

=== Defection to the National Party ===
Lane was faced with the choice of losing his cabinet seat and having to sit in opposition with the Nationals having a Minority Government vs joining the Nationals and retaining his portfolio. Brian Austin suggested they join the National Party, which they did, to much public uproar. In the end two thirds of the Merthyr Liberal Party branch joined the National Party in support of Lane. Bill Knox then defeated White to reclaim leadership of the Liberal Party, after 83 days, White's leadership of the party was over. This left the Liberals with only six members in the parliament of 89 members. The two defectors gave Bjelke-Petersen's Nationals an outright majority, allowing him to form government in his own right.

In return for defecting to the Nationals, Lane and Austin retained their cabinet posts, becoming the only two Brisbane based ministers and hence the most influential MPs from the capital.

Ahead of the 1986 state election, Lane led efforts to make Queensland's already severe malapportionment even more so, making a vote in the state's rural west worth double that of a vote in Brisbane. The Nationals won a crushing victory at that election, securing an outright majority for the only time at any level in Australia. Lane himself narrowly retained Merthyr after his replacement as Liberal candidate, Santo Santoro, just barely missed finishing second on the first count; had 30 more Australian Democrats voters preferenced Santoro over the Labor candidate, Santoro would have overtaken Labor for second place and defeated Lane on Labor preferences.

=== Fitzgerald Inquiry ===
In late 1986, two journalists, the ABC's Chris Masters and The Courier-Mail's Phil Dickie, independently began investigating the extent of police and political corruption in Queensland and its links to the National Party state government. Dickie's reports, alleging the apparent immunity from prosecution enjoyed by a group of illegal brothel operators, began appearing in early 1987; Masters' explosive Four Corners investigative report on police corruption entitled The Moonlight State aired on 11 May 1987. Within a week, Deputy Premier and Police Minister Bill Gunn, who was serving as acting premier while Bjelke-Petersen was campaigning for Prime Minister, decided to initiate a wide-ranging Commission of Inquiry into police corruption, despite opposition from Bjelke-Petersen. Gunn selected former Federal Court judge Tony Fitzgerald as its head. By late June, the terms of inquiry of what became known as the Fitzgerald Inquiry had been widened from members of the force to include "any other persons" with whom police might have been engaged in misconduct since 1977.

Fitzgerald began his formal hearings on 27 July 1987, and a month later the first bombshells were dropped as Sgt Harry Burgess—accused of accepting $221,000 in bribes since 1981—implicated senior officers Jack Herbert, Noel Dwyer, Graeme Parker and Commissioner Terry Lewis in complex graft schemes. Other allegations quickly followed, and on 21 September Gunn ordered Lewis—knighted in 1986 at Bjelke-Petersen's behest and now accused of having taken $663,000 in bribes—to stand down.

The ground had begun to shift out from under Bjelke-Petersen's feet even before the hearings began. The first allegations of corruption prompted the Labor opposition to ask the Governor, Sir Walter Campbell, to use his reserve power to sack Bjelke-Petersen. His position deteriorated rapidly; ministers were openly opposing him in Cabinet meetings, which had been almost unthinkable for most of his tenure.

Matters came to a head on 26 November, when a spill motion was carried by a margin of 38–9. Bjelke-Petersen boycotted the meeting, and thus did not nominate for the ensuing leadership vote, which saw Environment Minister Mike Ahern elected as the new leader with Gunn remaining as his deputy. Despite having helped do the numbers to topple Bjelke-Petersen, in December 1987, Lane was dumped to the backbench after being named adversely in the inquiry.

== Corruption allegations and prison (1989–1991) ==
The Fitzgerald hearings were told by Jack Herbert that Don Lane had been paid significant bribes. The inquiry showed that taxation and banking records proved that Lane had significant unexplained income. Of the 27 pages dedicated to activities by politicians, the majority focused on either Joh Bjelke-Petersen, Russ Hinze or Ted Lyons. One page was dedicated to Don Lane.

The report states:

Lane made some reference in his evidence to private benefactors, including a cash loan by an acquaintance who has since died and cash received from winning bets which were placed on his behalf, but substantially his explanation was based upon inaccurate claims to income tax deductions for expenditures which had not been made and the practices which he adopted to electoral campaign funds and his ministerial expense account.

Because of this, Lane confessed to misuse of his ministerial expenses, and named a number of other colleagues who he also claimed had done the same. Reporters and the public openly questioned why Lane believed he could stay in office after admitting to rorting. Realising that his position was untenable, Lane resigned from state parliament on 30 January 1989. He was succeeded in his seat of Merthyr by Santoro.

Shortly after the 1989 Queensland state election, Lane, along with Brian Austin, Leisha Harvey and Geoff Muntz were issued summons to appear at Brisbane Magistrates Court on charge of Misappropriation under the Criminal Code:

- Don Lane, 143 Charges covering $17,698.64
- Leisha Harvey, 124 Charges covering $42,364.01
- Brian Austin, 90 Charges covering $18,770.14 and
- Geoff Muntz, 73 charges involving $20,280.36.

On 3 October 1990, Lane was sentenced to 12 months prison for 27 counts of misappropriating public money (3 other counts the jury could not agree on). The case also cost him $350,000 in legal fees, and he had gotten $100,000 in taxation penalties.

After seven weeks, Lane was transferred to a half-way house (along with former Cabinet minister Brian Austin who arrived at jail on 30 November). He was released on home detention on 3 February 1991, and paroled two months later on 3 April.

The State Government originally had sought $834,657, including $450,000 in Super, but the Judge rejected this, requiring only $25,000.

== Later life (1991–1995) ==
His autobiography, Trial and Error, was published in 1993 by Boolarong Publications. The book is somewhat defensive about some of the accusations of violence made against the Special Branch, but is honest in describing how unprepared the branch was for protest movements and how amateurish information on people was categorised. He admitted that the Special Branch treated protesters as they did with criminals. "I thought this categorising of people in this way was stupid," recalled Lane, "... it was not arrived at by any clearly defined basis and has no legal merit".

Lane died in 1995 and was buried in Pinnaroo Cemetery.

The various leaders of each party paid tribute to Lane, noting the significant progress he made as Transport Minister and noting his close ties to the then significant Italian community of his seat of Merthyr.

== See also ==
- Terry Lewis
- Francis Bischof
- Dan Crowley
- Domenico Cacciola
- Crime in Brisbane
- Lucas Inquiry
- Queensland Council for Civil Liberties

Parliament of Queensland
Preceded by Ray Ramsden	Member for Merthyr; 1971 - 1989	Succeeded by Santo Santoro
