= Phil Dickie =

Australian journalist (born 1955)

Philip John Dickie OAM (born 1955) is an Australian journalist.

== Career ==
Dickie commenced his journalism career with the Australian National University student newspaper Woroni, serving as editor while studying forestry, politics, economics, sociology and linguistics in Canberra.

From 1982 until 1990, Dickie was a journalist with The Courier-Mail and The Sunday Mail in Brisbane, during which time he uncovered high levels of corruption in the Queensland Police Force and the Queensland Government which led to the Fitzgerald Inquiry. For this work, Dickie won the Gold Walkley in 1987.

=== Fitzgerald Inquiry ===
On 12 January 1987, The Courier-Mail published a front page story, written by Dickie, about dozens of illegal brothels which were believed to be operating in South East Queensland which the Queensland Police Force intentionally ignored. This prompted former police officer Nigel Powell to write to Dickie about what he knew. A series of ten newspaper articles about police corruption relating to vice and organised crime followed.

ABC Television's Four Corners subsequently broadcast a program by Chris Masters on 11 May 1987 entitled The Moonlight State about the same issue.

Dickie's newspaper stories, combined with Masters' Four Corners exposé, prompted police minister Bill Gunn to announce a Commission of Inquiry into Possible Illegal Activities and Associated Police Misconduct, which would be presided over by judge Tony Fitzgerald. Dickie gave evidence during the inquiry.

The inquiry's findings contributed to the collapse of Joh Bjelke-Petersen's long serving government and resulted in four government ministers (Leisha Harvey, Don Lane, Brian Austin and Geoff Muntz) and the Commissioner of the Queensland Police Force (Terry Lewis) being imprisoned.

For evidence he gave to the inquiry, Bjelke-Petersen was also trialled for perjury but due to a deadlocked jury, it was deemed to be a mistrial. It was later discovered that the jury foreman was a Young Nationals member and was involved with the "Friends of Joh" movement. There was no retrial as by that time Bjelke-Petersen was deemed to be too old.

In 1988, Dickie authored the book The Road to Fitzgerald and Beyond and the revised 1989 edition The Road to Fitzgerald and Beyond.

From 1990 until 1994, Dickie was a special advisor and research officer at the Criminal Justice Commission, which was established following the Fitzgerald Inquiry.

=== Other work ===
From 1998 until 2008, Dickie was a consultant and director at Melaleuca Media, a company that he and his wife owned. In 2018, he became a partner and manager at Stylus Media and Design Sarl, a Swiss-based consultancy company.

Dickie is also known for his involvement with the World Wide Fund for Nature.

=== Recognition ===
Dickie was awarded both the Gold Walkley for "Best Piece of Journalism Newspaper, Television or Print" and the Walkley Award for "Best Piece of Newspaper Reporting" at the 1987 Walkley Awards.

In 2017, Dickie was named as a Queensland Great.

He was awarded the Medal of the Order of Australia in the 2020 Australia Day Honours for his service to print journalism.
