= Ray Whitrod =

Australian police officer and criminologist

Commissioner Ray Whitrod AC, CVO, QPM
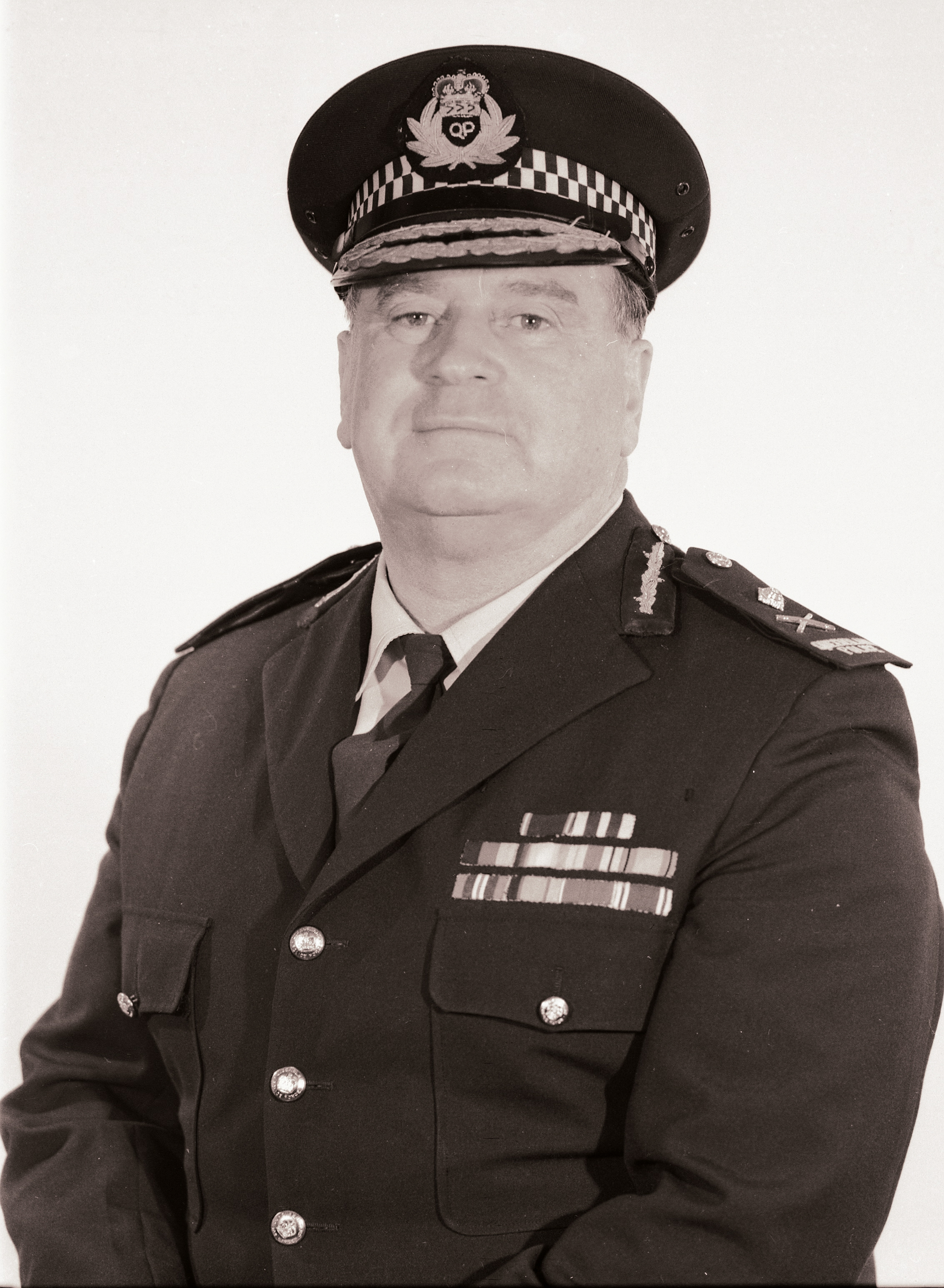

Commissioner of the Queensland Police Service
- In office 1970–1976
- Preceded by: Norm Bauer
- Succeeded by: Terry Lewis

Commissioner of the Commonwealth Police
- In office 1960–1969
- Preceded by: Himself
- Succeeded by: Jack Davis

Commissioner of the Commonwealth Investigation Service
- In office 1953–1960
- Preceded by: Eric Longfield Lloyd
- Succeeded by: Himself

Personal details
- Born: 16 April 1915 Adelaide, South Australia
- Died: 11 July 2003 (aged 88)
- Education: Australian National University; University of Cambridge
- Profession: Police officer, criminologist

Military service
- Allegiance: Australia
- Branch/service: Royal Australian Air Force
- Years of service: 1941–1945
- Rank: Flight Lieutenant
- Battles/wars: Second World War

Raymond Wells Whitrod, AC, CVO, QPM (16 April 1915 – 11 July 2003) was an Australian police officer and criminologist. He was considered a world leader in the way society treats victims of crime. He was known as a man of high professional standards, with a commitment to justice, equity and integrity. He became best known for his term as Commissioner of the Queensland Police Service, resigning in protest in 1976 at the corruption then endemic in Queensland, and in particular over the appointment by the Premier of Queensland, Joh Bjelke-Petersen, of Terry Lewis as Assistant Commissioner.

== Early life and career ==
Ray Whitrod was born in Adelaide on 16 April 1915, attending Adelaide High School. He joined the South Australia Police (SAPOL) in 1934. He was engaged in detective work from 1937 to 1941. He left to join the Royal Australian Air Force, seeing service as a navigator in north Africa and Europe. He then rejoined SAPOL.

In 1949 Whitrod moved to Sydney where he helped establish the Australian Security Intelligence Organisation (ASIO), and was engaged in investigating Soviet espionage. He was at the centre of investigations into Vladimir Petrov and his wife Evdokia, who defected in 1954.

== Policing career ==
Whitrod joined the Commonwealth Investigation Service as its director, moving to Canberra. The CIS became the Commonwealth Police Force (now the Australian Federal Police) in 1960, and Whitrod was its first commissioner. He remained in this post for nine years. He was the driving force behind the Commonwealth Police Act and the Australian Police College, now the Australian Institute of Police Management, at North Head.

In 1963 Whitrod attained a Bachelor of Economics degree from the Australian National University (ANU), which he had been studying part-time since the late 1950s. He attained a postgraduate degree in criminology at the University of Cambridge in 1965.

Whitrod served as the Papua New Guinea Police Commissioner from 1969 to 1970. This came about after a casual telephone conversation with the retiring commissioner, a personal friend, who asked Whitrod to ask around to see of there was anyone willing to replace him. Whitrod agreed to make some enquiries, but could find nobody willing. He reported back to the retiring commissioner, who said that his departure date was fixed, and asked if Whitrod himself might be interested. Without even consulting with his wife, he agreed.

Whitrod became Queensland Police Commissioner in 1970 and immediately set out to eradicate corruption, raise educational standards and bring women into all fields of policing. He organised for the Queensland Education Department to provide officers with classes in literacy and basic arithmetic. As an inducement to attend classes, he offered an extra week's leave for every subject they sat. The Police Union objected with such vehemence that they by-passed both Whitrod and his Police Minister, Max Hodges, and complained directly to the Premier Joh Bjelke-Petersen. Bjelke-Petersen, himself a former Police Minister, endorsed the union's stand and he publicly declared that "the Queensland people do not require their police to be Rhodes scholars". Whitrod clashed with the premier on other matters.

The last straw was the appointment of the little-known Terry Lewis to be Whitrod's Assistant Commissioner. The position had become vacant, and Whitrod chose his preferred candidate. He advised the Cabinet of this name, and the names of two others also acceptable to him and to the Police Union. It had always been the practice for the Cabinet to endorse the Police Commissioner's recommendation for his assistant. In this case, however, they chose Terry Lewis, an inspector, who was known to be a close associate and bagman of the corrupt former Police Commissioner Francis Bischof. He was also less qualified for the position than at least 60 other men. Whitrod believed all his efforts for seven years to eradicate corruption would be undermined if the appointment went ahead, and he asked to speak to Bjelke-Petersen. However, the premier refused to see Whitrod, nor would he allow him to address the Cabinet on the matter. That night, Whitrod wrote out his resignation. Lewis was then appointed Police Commissioner. Prior to leaving Queensland for Canberra, Whitrod and his wife were subject to harassment and intimidation. He would have unordered taxis turning up during the night, sometimes three or four times a night, to take him to the airport. He would receive calls from strangers enquiring about his health, although he had an unlisted number. A heart specialist came to his house at three o'clock in the morning because he had been told by police headquarters that Whitrod was having a heart attack. He had a large load of gravel he had not purchased dumped on his front garden. He became so frightened for his and his wife's safety that he took to sleeping with a revolver under his pillow. A large number of personal files, detailing police corruption, were mysteriously lost in transit between Brisbane and Canberra.

== Criminologist and later life ==
After his resignation, Whitrod taught criminology as a visiting fellow in the Department of Sociology at the ANU from 1977 to 1981. He had been awarded a Masters of Arts in Sociology from the ANU in 1972.

The Fitzgerald Inquiry in the 1980s revealed institutionalised corruption in Queensland during Bjelke-Petersen's time, and vindicated Whitrod's stance. Terry Lewis had been knighted, but was later stripped of his knighthood and jailed for criminal activity. The Fitzgerald Inquiry led to Bjelke-Petersen's political downfall, and he himself was charged with perjury, the case being dismissed only because of a hung jury, the foreman of which was an undeclared active member of Bjelke-Petersen's National Party.

In 1979, Whitrod and his wife returned to Adelaide. He founded the Victims of Crime (now Victim Support) Service, an Australian first. Under Whitrod's guidance, the service went on to establish itself across the nation. He taught as a Residential Scholar at the University of Adelaide from 1992 to 1995. In 1993 he began a PhD in Psychology.

Whitrod also played a significant role in forming the National Police Research Unit (now the Australasian Centre for Policing Research) in Adelaide, and the Australian Institute of Criminology.

In retirement, Whitrod's extensive community involvement included the first national presidency of the Prison After-Care Council, and membership of the South Australian Government's Commission for the Ageing. He was also the driving force behind the establishment of the Australian Society of Victimology. He was a major contributor to the introduction of uniform crime statistics in Australia.

Whitrod's memoirs were published as Before I Sleep (University of Queensland Press, St Lucia). He died in 2003.

== Honours ==
Whitrod was made a Member of the Fourth Class of the Royal Victorian Order (later regraded as Lieutenant) in 1954. He was elevated to Commander of the Royal Victorian Order in 1963. He received the Queen's Police Medal in 1967, was named Queenslander of the Year in 1972, was appointed a Member of the Order of Australia in 1987, and in 1993 became a Companion of the Order of Australia.

Whitrod was honoured with a Laudatis from the World Society of Victimology in 1994. In 1997, he received an honorary doctorate in laws from the Australian National University.

On 24 September 2007, Mick Keelty presented the inaugural Ray Whitrod Oration.

== Personal life ==
In 1938 Whitrod married Mavis, seven years his senior, who died in 2001. They had two sons and a daughter. His son and daughter-in-law, Andrew and Diane Whitrod were killed in a car crash in 2001. He was survived by his other son Ian, and his daughter Ruth.

== Sources ==
- Police Journal Online
- ANU Honorary Doctor of Laws
- AFP: Inaugural Ray Whitrod Oration 2007
- Australian Biography: Transcript of extended interview with Ray Whitrod
- It’s an Honour: MVO 1954
- It’s an Honour: CVO 1963
- It’s an Honour: QPM 1967
- It’s an Honour: AM 1987
- It’s an Honour: AC 1993
