= Ben Robertson =

Ben Robertson may refer to:

- Ben Robertson (journalist) (1903–1943), American author, journalist and World War II war correspondent
- Ben Robertson (footballer) (born 1971), former Australian rules footballer
- Ben Robertson (actor) on Executive Stress
- Ben Robertson, co-author of autobiography of Domenico Cacciola
