= Lucas Inquiry =

The Lucas Inquiry, chaired by Justice G. A. G. Lucas, began in 1976 and was constituted to look into police corruption in Queensland, but the Inquiry was seriously flawed, reliant as it was, on its star witness Jack Herbert, The Bagman who confessed at the later Fitzgerald Inquiry to organised corruption for almost his entire career within the Police Force and afterwards. It was prompted by the Queensland Council for Civil Liberties, along with the Queensland Law Society, who demanded an inquiry into police corruption. Justice Lucas took evidence from Jack Herbert and listened to tapes made by Senior Constable Frank Davey, a friend of the corrupt Bagman, Herbert, but didn’t interview the honest cops who were the subject of the allegations.

== Background ==
The Lucas Inquiry emanated from the "Southport Betting Case," a trial where a number of corrupt high-ranking police officers were alleged to have collaborated with two bookmakers to clear them of prosecution. Originally Jock Rutherford a Magistrate known to be hard on Bookmakers was scheduled to hear the case, but at the last minute the date was changed meaning Magistrate Leo McConnell would hear the case instead. In November 1974 two suspected "starting price" bookmakers, Brian Leonard George Sieber and Stanley Derwent Saunders, were charged and arrested "with possession of instruments of betting" and it was alleged these two men and many other bookmakers operating in Brisbane and on the Gold Coast were chief sources of "corrupt payments to police" in the Licensing Branch, a subsection of the Criminal Intelligence Unit (CIU). The CIU was a police department "formed to collect, record and disseminate intelligence on organized crime and corruption, and to apprehend and prosecute those involved."

In 1974, to clean up the Licensing Branch, a new Inspector was appointed in Arthur Pitts, who laid seventeen charges against SP bookmakers in three months. Prior to Pitts appointment there had been only three prosecutions in the past four years. As a result of the crackdown, Sergeant Reginald Neal Freier asked former Licensing Branch sergeant, Jack Herbert to approach Pitts with a bribe, to reinstate ‘The Joke’ which had ended when Herbert had left the police force. Herbert did so along with Freier and a bookmaker, Paddy McIntyre. However anticipating such an approach, Pitts had his house wired, with Detective Basil ‘The Hound’ Hicks present, hiding in another room. In the aftermath of the event, Des Sturgess reported having drinks with Terry Lewis and Tony Murphy, who were furious with Herbert being set up. Following the Herbert sting, Pitts was scheduled to go on a raid with three of his team: Sergeant Con Horgan, Senior Constable Ollie Boyce and Constable Frank Davey, but Ollie Boyce did not even show up, and so Mick Cacciola subbed in for him. The ensuing raid saw them arrest Saunders and Sieber. After the raid, with only 8 months in charge of the Licensing Squad, Pitts was transferred to the Gold Coast.

In the middle of the trial Frank Davey alleged that Pitts had forged warrants and tried to ‘brick’ the bookmakers (falsify evidence against them). He then revealed he had been given a micro cassette tape recorder by Jack Herbert, and had taped four separate conversations with officers to ‘prove’ his allegations. After giving the evidence, Davey jumped in a car with Herbert. It seemed that the Bagman, Jack Herbert had master minded a defeat against the Licensing Branch in the Southport case to set a precedent in his own case. Davey had met with Herbert in his home, and told showed him the warrant which was largely blank, and they plotted to have Davey wear a tape recorder when talking to Pitts and others. Herbert wrote to a friend in San Diego and got him to send the miniature tape recorder over for Davey to wear. Mick Cacciola later got a sworn statement from another officer, where Ollie Boyce admitted he was told to be late.

In 1975, the results of the trial found neither men guilty and the loss was devastating to the campaign against both corruption and the integrity of the CIU. "The Criminal Intelligence Unit had failed to secure a prosecution in a seemingly iron-clad case-one where money was actually paid over, the vital conversations had been taped and most of the activities had been observed by members of the CIU." To make matters worse, Herbert and his co-accused also later were acquitted at a jury trial.

The two cases were a body blow to then Commissioner Whitrod’s credibility, and were used by corrupt cops to undermine him. Whitrod punshied Arthur Pitts by transferring him yet again from Southport to running the property office at police headquarters, the ultimate insult for such a renowned crusader.

The negative press prompted an investigation into police behaviour, resulting in the Lucas Inquiry. Terry O'Gorman said at the National Convention on Civil Liberties, held in 1976, “the conclusions on the Southport Case cast serious doubt on the reliability and integrity of inspectors in the Queensland Police Force."

Jack Herbert would later testify to the Fitzgerald Inquiry that Detective Sergeant Reginald Neal Freier was corrupt and Constable Frank Davey had conspired with him to set up Arthur Pitts. Herbert also testified that both Tony Murphy and Terry Lewis came to see him before his trial, both anxious to find out whether they would be mentioned.

== Aims ==
The aims of the inquiry were to:

- Investigate police fabrication of evidence and testimonies;
- Protect individuals from police interrogation and harassment and;
- To discover whether police have too much power interrogating, searching and arresting citizens.

== Findings ==
The Lucas report resulted in findings of significant police misconduct and corruption, assault and proof of police "planting evidence, forging warrants and fabricating confessions." One of the reports recommendations were that police interviews be recorded to reduce verballing. O'Gorman, although praising the recommended introduction of tape recordings during police interviews, was highly critical of the report as there were no police charged with misconduct and many were even promoted. He said "the inquiry has made the comment that here we have these officers who have not only not been proceeded against but a number of the principal offenders have been promoted. What sort of a police force do we have if the upper echelons of the police force are led to believe that mis-deeds will be rewarded by subsequent promotion.”

== Aftermath of Southport Betting Scandal ==
For the Bagman, Jack Reginald Herbert, he would die in 2004, after admitting to his guilt at the Fitzgerald Inquiry, he gained immunity from prosecution and lived with Police protection for many years. While Herbert admitted both his role and Davey’s role in the scheme, Davey submitted a statutory declaration to the Inquiry denying he had ever committed perjury, and with just his word and Herbert’s, he was never charged with anything. Mick Cacciola had to bring before Inspector Graham Williams and Superintendent John Huey, a number of ex-Licensing Branch cops believed to be corrupt but hadn’t been brought to account during the Fitzgerald Inquiry (eg. due to insufficient evidence, or just not specifically mentioned by Herbert), to ensure that they were at least transferred to roles they could be closely managed, which included Ollie Boyce.

For the honest cops who tried to combat corruption, Arthur Pitts died in 2005, aged 86 years of age. Con Horgan died on 31 May 2000, after becoming a recluse, and when he was dying he told his wife that no police were allowed to attend his funeral. Alex Jeppesen, who was not on the raid, succeeded Pitts as the Inspector in charge of the Licensing Branch. It took a while for Terry Lewis to remove him from the force, and Jeppesen even managed to gain an audience with Premier Joh Bjelke-Petersen and the then Police Minister Ron Camm, where he played them taped conversations with informants on police corruption. Terry Lewis found out about the meeting and transferred him from Licensing to Mobile Patrols, then forced him out of the Force, as medically unfit in 1979, after his house was raided and pet corgi shot dead. Jeppesen died on 1 October 2008

For the bookmakers, Stanley Derwent Saunders died in 2014, aged 92 Years. Friends described him as an icon of the underworld (strange description for someone meant to have been innocent). In 1986, Saunders sued Pitts, Horgan and Jeppesen, and at that time Brian Leonard George Sieber was already dead.

== See also ==
- Fitzgerald Inquiry
