= Chloe Dallimore =

Australian actor, singer and dancer

Chloe Dallimore AM
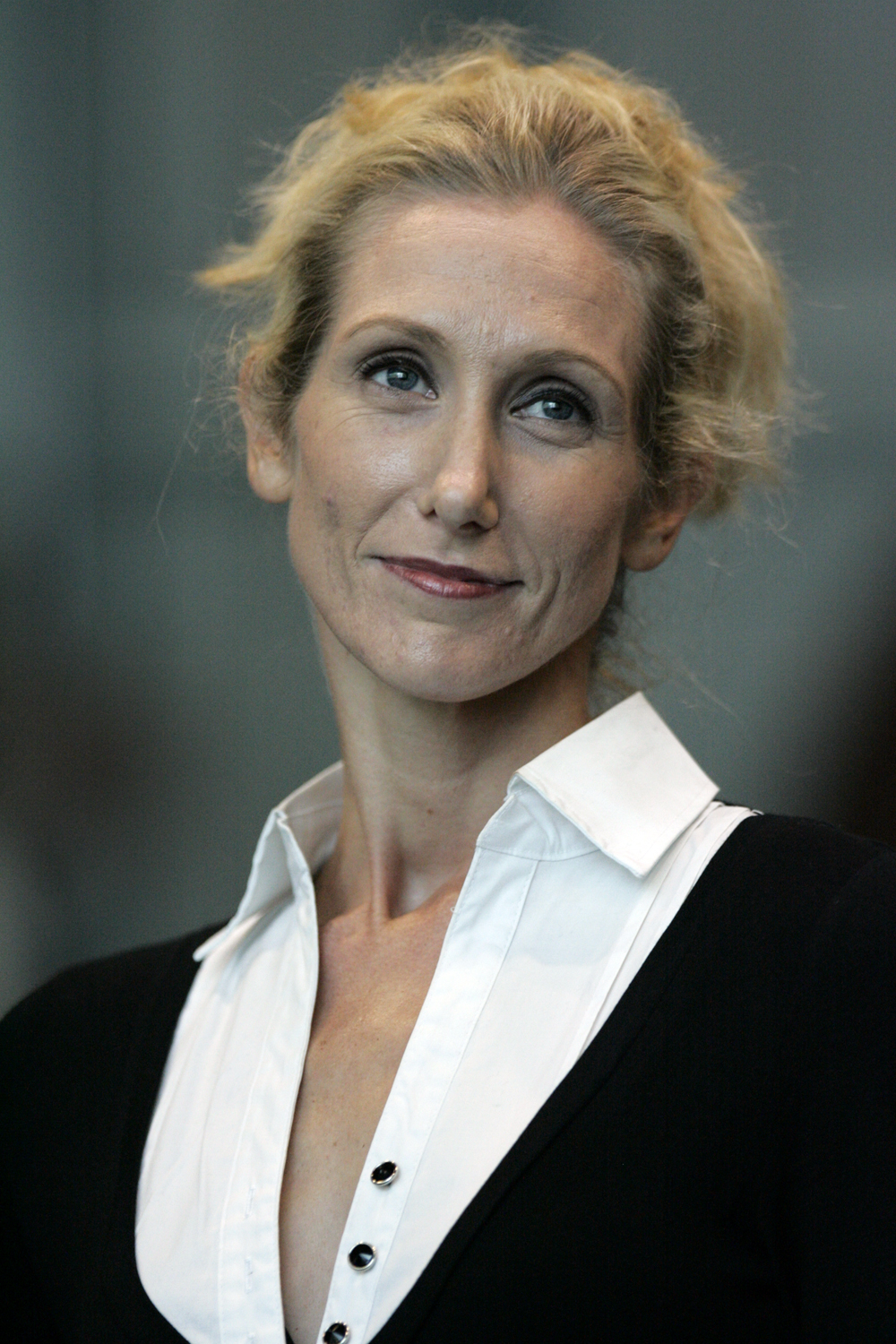
- Dallimore in 2013, at the Addams Family rehearsal
- Born: Melbourne, Australia

Chloe Bennett Dallimore AM (b. 1974–75) is an Australian actor, singer and dancer, best known for performances in musical theatre.

== Early life ==
Dallimore began dance lessons on the Mornington Peninsula from a very young age then studied the Cecchetti ballet method and trained under singing teacher Gary May in Melbourne. She won a Cameron Mackintosh scholarship and moved to London at 17 where she took lessons in acting, tap and jazz dancing at the London Studio Centre.

== Career ==
In the early 1990s Dallimore came back to Australia to join the original Australian cast of Crazy for You. She has appeared in many musicals since then including Chicago, The Addams Family, The Wizard of Oz and Joh for PM.

She has also appeared on television including Spicks and Specks and Good Morning Australia and in two documentaries The Show Must Go On (2017) and Andrew Lloyd Webber: Masterpiece (2002).

She is best known for her performance as Ulla in Mel Brooks' musical The Producers (2004/05). Standing 1.78 m (5 ft 10 in) her physique and dancing ability won her the role. For The Producers, Dallimore won the Helpmann Award for Best Female Actor in a Musical.

In 2011 she directed and choreographed Sweet Charity for the Central Queensland Conservatorium of Music in Mackay.

Dallimore provides musical entertainment, at times with PJ Lane, at corporate functions.

== Reviews ==
David Allen wrote of Dallimore after her casting with John Waters as the stars of The Addams Family (2013),

John Waters and Chloe Dallimore have both carved out a place for themselves as icons in Australian showbiz – and more specifically they are icons of the Australian musical theatre. Their resumes are spectacularly diverse. Between the two of them, they have played some of the greatest roles ever written for the stage.

Mel Brooks the writer/creator of The Producers commented to Dallimore in the role of Ulla, "I love what you're doing in the show. Love your comic timing. The way you say you're going to belt [a song] and you belt."

== MEAA Equity ==
Dallimore is the President of Equity, the Australian union body for actors and other live performers. Her previous roles have included serving on the National Performers Committee, involvement in Federal Council AGMs and negotiations with producers regarding Performers Collective Agreements.

As President Dallimore is currently gathering support from other performers against the importation of overseas performers to fill lead roles in upcoming musicals. In 2012 the peak body for producers in Australia, Live Performance Australia ended an agreement with the Media Entertainment and Arts Alliance on the casting of overseas performers. The lack of an Imported Artists Agreement has raised concerns for local performers.

== Awards ==
- 2005: Winner Victorian Green Room Association Awards Best leading female artist in music theatre: The Producers
- 2004: Winner Australian Dance Awards Outstanding Achievement in Commercial Dance, Musicals or Physical Theatre
- 2005: Winner Sydney Theatre Awards Best Actress in a Supporting Role: The Producers
- 2005: Winner Helpmann Awards Best Female Actor in a Musical: The Producers
- 2013: Nominated Helpmann Awards for Best Female Actor in a Musical: The Addams Family
- 2023: Member of the Order of Australia in the 2023 Australia Day Honours

=== Mo Awards ===
The Australian Entertainment Mo Awards (commonly known informally as the Mo Awards), were annual Australian entertainment industry awards. They recognise achievements in live entertainment in Australia from 1975 to 2016.

Year	Nominee / work	Award	Result (wins only)
2004	Chloe Dallimore	Female Musical Theatre Performer	Won

== Filmography ==
Year	Title	Role	Director
2006	Happy Feet		

== Theatre ==
Performances as listed on AusStage, Sydney Morning Herald and JUTE Theatre Company,

Year	Title	Venue	Year	Title	Venue
1997 (9–25 Nov)	Crazy For You	Theatre Royal, Sydney	1997/98 (30 Nov-20 Feb)	Crazy For You	State Theatre Melbourne
1998 (4 Jul-20 Dec)	Chicago – The Musical	Her Majesty's Theatre, Melbourne	1999	Chicago – The Musical	Capitol Theatre, Haymarket
2000 (17 Feb-25 Mar)	Chicago – The Musical	Lyric Theatre, South Brisbane	2000 (16 Nov)	Annie	Lyric Theatre, Pyrmont
2001/2002 (24 Nov-24 Feb)	The Wizard of Oz	Lyric Theatre, Pyrmon	2004 (17 Apr–Aug)	The Producers	Princess Theatre, Melbourne
2004 (7 Nov)	Hats Off to Sondheim	National Theatre, St Kilda	2005 (Mar)	The Producers	Lyric Theatre, South Brisbane
2005 (14 May-30 Oct)	The Producers	Lyric Theatre, Pyrmont	2006 (4–8 Oct)	Thoroughly Modern Millie	State Theatre, Melbourne
2007 (13 Jun–Jul)	Allo 'Allo	Twelfth Night Theatre, Bowen Hills	2008 (8 Sep)	Gala Concert	Her Majesty's Theatre, Melbourne
2009 (15–19 Jul)	Crazy for You	State Theatre, Melbourne	2013 (23 Mar-16 Jun)	The Addams Family	Capitol Theatre, Sydney
2013 (6–14 Jul)	Gypsy	State Theatre, Melbourne	2014 (21 Nov-13 Dec)	Beyond Desire	Hayes Theatre Co, Potts Point
2017 (7–16 Jul)	Joh for PM	Brisbane Powerhouse	2017 (4–19 Aug)	Joh for PM	JUTE Theatre, Cairns
