= Joh for PM (musical) =

2017 Australian comedy musical

- Music: Paul Hodge
- Lyrics: Paul Hodge
- Book: Stephen Carleton
- Basis: Joh for Canberra campaign
- Premiere: 7 July 2017: Brisbane Powerhouse, Brisbane

Joh for PM is an Australian musical comedy written by Stephen Carleton with music and lyrics by Paul Hodge.

== Premise ==
The show is a satire about Queensland's longest-serving premier, Sir Joh Bjelke-Petersen. Set at a fundraiser in 1987, Joh for PM follows the life and politics of the former premier, framed on his doomed campaign to become Prime Minister. It covers Bjelke-Petersen's rise and fall, supported by wife Flo and her pumpkin scones.

== Production ==
The original production starred Colin Lane, Chloe Dallimore, Kurt Phelan, Barbara Lowing, Stephen Hirst and Simon Burvill-Homes. It played at the Brisbane Powerhouse from 7 to 16 July 2017 and Cairns' Centre for Contemporary Arts from 4 to 19 August 2017. It was presented by JUTE Theatre Company and Brisbane Powerhouse in association with the Queensland Music Festival.

== Reception ==
The musical was generally well received. The Guardian described it as "campy, glorious fun". The Courier-Mail noted that "it doesn't get any more Queensland than this, right down to the pineapple emblems displayed on the groin areas of various costumes".

== Awards ==
Joh for PM was nominated for a 2017 Matilda Award for Best Musical or Cabaret.
