= Fitzgerald Inquiry =

Australian police corruption inquiry (1987–1989)

The Commission of Inquiry into Possible Illegal Activities and Associated Police Misconduct (the Fitzgerald Inquiry; 1987–1989) into Queensland Police corruption was a judicial inquiry presided over by Tony Fitzgerald QC with Patsy Wolfe appointed as Deputy Commissioner. The inquiry resulted in the resignation of Queensland's premier, Joh Bjelke-Petersen, the calling of two by-elections, and the jailing of three former ministers and the Police Commissioner Terry Lewis (who also lost his knighthood). It also contributed to the end of the National Party of Australia's 32-year run as the governing political party in Queensland.

== History ==
The inquiry was established in response to a series of articles by reporter Phil Dickie in The Courier-Mail about high-level police corruption, followed by a Four Corners television report on the same issue by Chris Masters, entitled "The Moonlight State", which aired on 11 May 1987. Both investigations dealt with illegal prostitution and gambling aided by police corruption. With Queensland's Premier of 18 years, Joh Bjelke-Petersen, out of the state, his deputy, Bill Gunn, ordered a commission of inquiry the day after the television report was broadcast.

The allegations aired in the media were not new. They had surfaced from time to time and some news organisations had been forced to pay damages to aggrieved people who alleged their reputations had been damaged (Bjelke-Petersen himself was notoriously litigious in response to unfavourable press coverage). The government was reported to have initially preferred District Court Judge Eric Pratt, chair of the controversial Police Complaints Tribunal and a close friend of Police Commissioner Lewis, to head the inquiry, which led to fears by journalists that it would be a whitewash. After consulting the legal profession, Attorney-General Paul Clauson opposed Pratt as unsuitable and he was removed from consideration.

The government then approached Ian Callinan to head the inquiry, but he refused on the basis that he was perceived to be too close to the government. Callinan recommended Fitzgerald as a suitable head. He also drafted the terms of reference for the inquiry and represented the Queensland Government before it. While the terms of reference were initially narrow, restricted only to the specific allegations raised against specific persons named in the media over a period of just five years, Fitzgerald used his moral authority to expand the inquiry to examine any relevant matter. As a result, the terms of reference of the Commission were extended twice.

That enabled Fitzgerald to set a precedent for commissions of inquiry and Royal Commissions in Australia generally, using innovative methods, such as indemnities from prosecution for key witnesses, to secure vital evidence. He began formal hearings on 27 July 1987. The inquiry was initially expected to last about six weeks; it instead spent almost two years conducting a comprehensive investigation of long-term, systemic political corruption and abuse of power in Queensland. Public sittings were held on 238 days, hearing testimony from 339 witnesses.

On 28 August, a Licensing Branch sergeant, Harry Burgess confessed to corruption, and implicated Jack Herbert, and assistant commissioner Graeme Parker. In turn, Parker implicated police commissioner Terry Lewis on 16 September.

The inquiry eventually outlived the Bjelke-Petersen government. Mike Ahern became the new Premier after Bjelke-Petersen was deposed by his own party. Evidence revealed by the investigation, including testimony from Bjelke-Petersen himself, caused significant political damage and led to a power struggle within the National Party. Bjelke-Petersen resigned as Premier after an unsuccessful attempt to have the Governor of Queensland sack all of his ministers after they had deposed him as party leader.

The inquiry's special prosecutor was Doug Drummond QC. It was Drummond who decided not to retry Bjelke-Petersen after a hung jury had failed to convict him of corruption and perjury.

== Findings ==
Fitzgerald's report was submitted on 3 July 1989. As a result, a number of high-profile politicians were charged with crimes, and Queensland Police Commissioner Terry Lewis was charged with corruption.

Bjelke-Petersen himself was put on trial for perjury in respect of evidence he gave to the inquiry. The jury in the case was deadlocked, bringing about a mistrial. In 1992, it was revealed that the jury foreman, Luke Shaw, was a member of the Young Nationals, was identified with the "Friends of Joh" movement, and had misrepresented the state of deliberations to the judge. According to an ABC TV analysis, "A later inquiry conducted by Justice Bill Carter found the selection process had been manipulated by ... ex-police officers ... helping to put Joh before a jury led by Young Nationals member, Luke Shaw". A special prosecutor announced in 1992 there would be no retrial because Sir Joh, then aged 81, was too old.

Jack Herbert had been the bagman, collecting bribes for police commissioner Terry Lewis from 1980. Lewis himself had been a bagman for former commissioner Francis Bischof. Lewis was convicted and subsequently stripped of his knighthood.

Leisha Harvey, a former health minister, was charged with misappropriating of public funds as part of an investigation resulting from the findings of the inquiry. She spent one year in jail. Don Lane, a former transport minister, was sentenced to twelve months imprisonment for falsifying expense accounts. Lane's resignation resulted in the 1989 Merthyr state by-election. Brian Austin, another former health minister, was convicted of misappropriating public funds. Geoff Muntz was convicted of misappropriation of ministerial expense funds. The resignation of senior minister Russell Hinze, after damaging allegations were made against him during the inquiry, led to the 1988 South Coast state by-election.

The Queensland Police Special Bureau was formed on 30 July 1940 and renamed Special Branch on 7 April 1948. It was criticised for being used for political purposes by the Bjelke-Petersen government in the 1970s and 1980s, for example, enforcing laws against protests, sometimes outnumbering the protesters or using provocateurs to incite violence so the protesters could be arrested, and investigating and harassing political opponents. Following a recommendation by the Fitzgerald Inquiry, the Special Branch was disbanded in 1989, having destroyed its records before Fitzgerald could subpoena them.

In large part due to public anger over the revelations in the Fitzgerald report, the National Party was decisively defeated in the December 1989 state election, which brought the Australian Labor Party to power for the first time since 1957.

=== Recommendations ===
The two most significant recommendations were the establishment of the Criminal Justice Commission (CJC) and the Electoral and Administrative Review Commission which was to review electoral boundaries. The need for Freedom of Information legislation in the state was noted, as was the need to review laws relating to public assembly and guidelines for the disclosure of pecuniary interests of parliamentarians. The CJC was to be responsible for investigating specific individuals mentioned during the inquiry.

The police culture of the state was also criticised. Aspects such as loyalty to fellow police officers, police not enforcing laws against other police, and failure to listen to whistle-blowers, were condemned because they led to misconduct, inefficiency and contempt for the justice system. Many of the inquiry's recommendations were implemented by Wayne Goss, the first Labor Party Premier of Queensland in 32 years.

== Cultural depictions ==
The investigation leading up to the inquiry and the inquiry itself were depicted in the 1989 TV movie Police State by Chris Noonan.

Bjelke-Petersen's trial was later the subject of a TV movie, Joh's Jury.

Margot Hutcheson painted a picture of the inquiry, Wasn't the Fitzgerald Inquiry Fun?

In 2009 as part of the Q150 celebrations, the Fitzgerald Inquiry was announced as one of the Q150 Icons of Queensland for its role as a "Defining Moment".

Folk singer John Dengate wrote the satirical song "The Queensland Policeman" about the inquiry.

== See also ==
- Government of Queensland
- List of Australian political controversies
- Domenico Cacciola
- Lucas Inquiry
- Queensland Council for Civil Liberties

== Bibliography ==
- Commission of Inquiry into Possible Illegal Activities and Associated Police Misconduct, "Fitzgerald Inquiry Report" and Appendices, Government Printer, Brisbane, 1989.
- Atherton, James. Appendices to the Report. issuu, 1989, 242pp
