= Frank Bischof =

Commissioner Frank Bischof LVO QPM
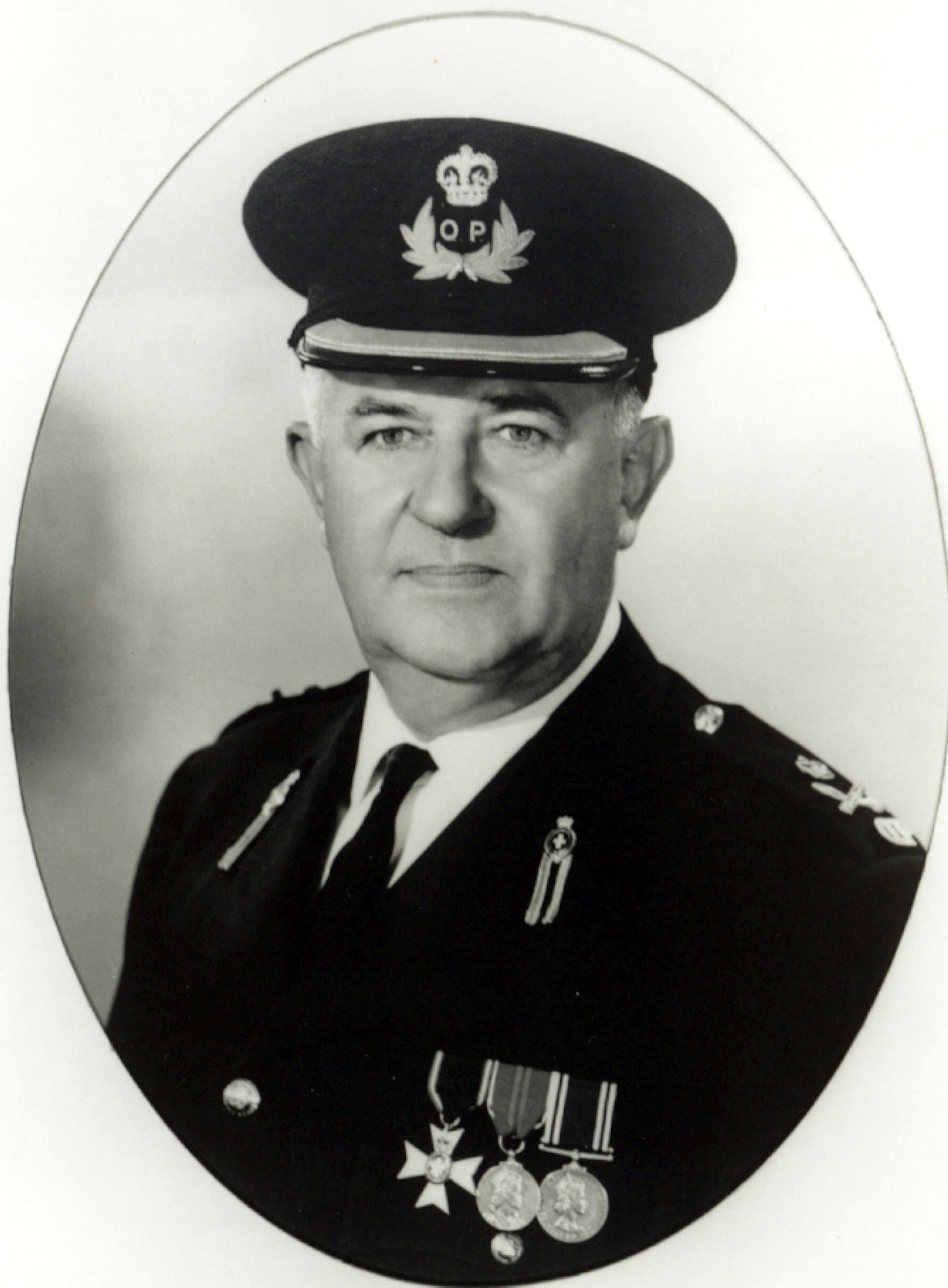

Commissioner of the Queensland Police Service
- In office January 1958 – 13 February 1969
- Preceded by: Thomas William Harrold
- Succeeded by: Norm Bauer

Personal details
- Born: 12 October 1904 Gowrie Junction, Queensland, Australia
- Died: 28 August 1979 (aged 74) South Brisbane, Queensland, Australia
- Profession: Police officer

Francis Erich Bischof, LVO, QPM (12 October 1904 – 28 August 1979) was the Queensland Police Commissioner in Australia from January 1958 until his resignation, on 13 February 1969, amidst allegations of corruption.

== Early life ==
Frank Bischof was born at Gowrie Junction, Queensland, on 12 October 1904, the fourth child in a family of nine, and grew up on a dairy farm. He attended Toowoomba Grammar School, and worked in a cheese factory before joining the Queensland Police Force in 1925. He married Dorothy Gledhill on 22 February 1930 at St Mary's Anglican Church in Alderley, Brisbane.

== Queensland Police ==
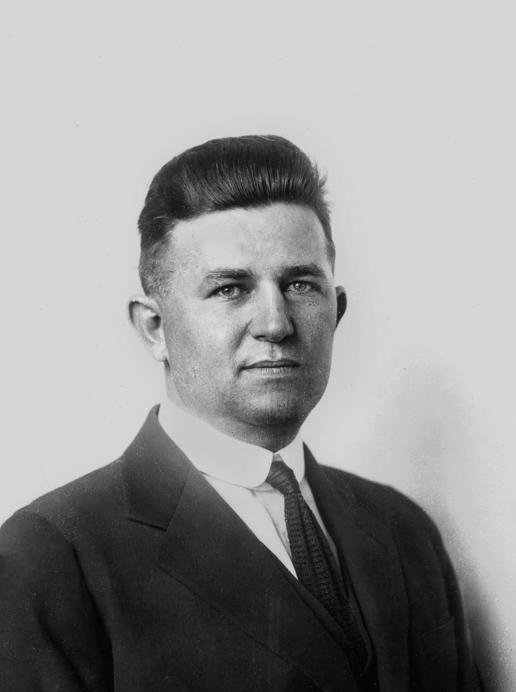
Bischof in 1931

Stationed with the Criminal Investigation Branch (CIB) in Brisbane, he was promoted to sergeant in 1939 and inspector in 1949. He studied in Britain (including Scotland Yard) and Europe, returning to Australia in 1950 and investigating the Bulimba elections fraud. Described as 'the Big Fella' – Bischof was 6 ft 2 in (188 cm) tall and weighed 16 stone (100 kg) – he gained thirty-two convictions in thirty-three murder investigations. In 1955 he became head of the CIB.

In January 1958 Bischof was appointed Commissioner of Police by Premier of Queensland, Frank Nicklin. The appointment was criticised as a political one by the opposition Labor Party, which felt that at least two other senior officers were more suitable. Tony Fitzgerald, who between 1987 and 1989 headed a commission of inquiry into corruption in Queensland, commented on page 31 of his report that the appointment of Bischof, who was a Mason, marked a deliberate transition away from the previously dominant Irish-Catholic "Green Mafia" influence in the Queensland Police, particularly since Bischof was appointed over the head of the more senior James Edward Donovan, a Catholic.

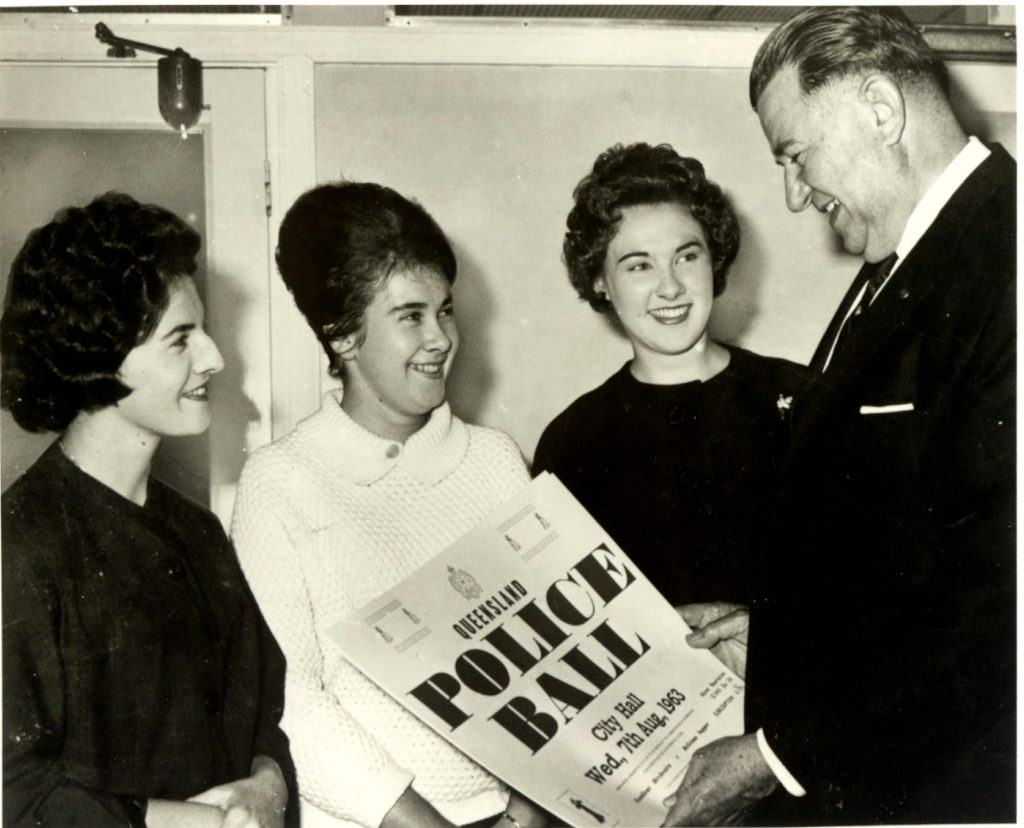
Bischof discussing the 1963 Police Ball with three debutantes from the Main Roads Department

As commissioner, Bischof set about boosting police morale and the image they portrayed to the Queensland public. He implemented a series of transfers and promotions, and set up a Public Relations Bureau as part of his plans. He attended many public functions to encourage co-operation with, and support for, the Queensland Police. In 1959 he was named Queensland's first 'Father of the Year', even though he was childless.

However Bischof was an inveterate gambler, which undoubtedly led him into very shady territory. Fitzgerald's report says:

... in some respects police corruption had acquired a quaint quasi-legitimacy by the Bischof era. Numerous appointments to commissioned rank with suitable posting were made as retirements loomed, and it became traditional for a retirement to be accompanied by a send-off testimonial, which provided an opportunity for those with special reason for gratitude, such as hoteliers who had not been unduly harassed by strict enforcing of the licensing laws, to demonstrate their appreciation in a tangible way. Bischof himself was said to be deeply involved. One specific incident related in evidence concerned an occasion when he prevented a proposed undercover operation to apprehend the principal responsible for illegal baccarat games. He was also deduced by honest Licensing Branch police to have been the person who warned a country "SP" (starting price) bookmaker of an impending raid.

During Bischof's tenure, there was persistent criticism of Bischof's management of the police force. Allegations and suggestions were made in parliament of corruption, abuse of power, and negligence on the part of individual police officers. There was also concern over undue police zeal in handling street demonstrations. During 1963 and 1964 a Royal Commission was held into alleged police protection of a call-girl service operating out of the National Hotel in Brisbane. The Commissioner, Justice Harry Gibbs did not find that such a service operated, but he did criticise the lax enforcement of the licensing laws due to friendships between hotel management and police. It seems likely that the inquiry was hampered by a cover-up, because in 1971 one of the key witnesses admitted to perjuring herself.

State Treasurer Thomas Hiley established the extent of Bischof's gambling habit and confronted him. On 13 February 1969, only 240 days before his retirement, Bischof suddenly took leave on medical grounds. In December 1974 he was charged with stealing, but the Crown decided not to prosecute.

Bischof died on 28 August 1979 in South Brisbane, and was survived by his wife.

== Paedophilia allegations ==
Bischof operated clinics for difficult children at his office, which attempted to illustrate to potentially wayward children the error of their ways, during the 1950s–1960s. However, it was also a way for Bischof to have access to the hundreds of young children who did. Margaret Fels, a housewife from Eight Mile Plains, had an affair with Bischof. Journalist Matthew Condon, in his book Jacks and Jokers, reported that two of her sons alleged that Bischof had sexually assaulted them, and they believed that he may have also assaulted a third, deceased, sibling.

== See also ==
- Terry Lewis
- Lucas Inquiry
- History of the Queensland Police
- Fitzgerald Inquiry
