= Terry Lewis (police officer) =

Australian police officer (1928–2023)

Commissioner Terry Lewis GM
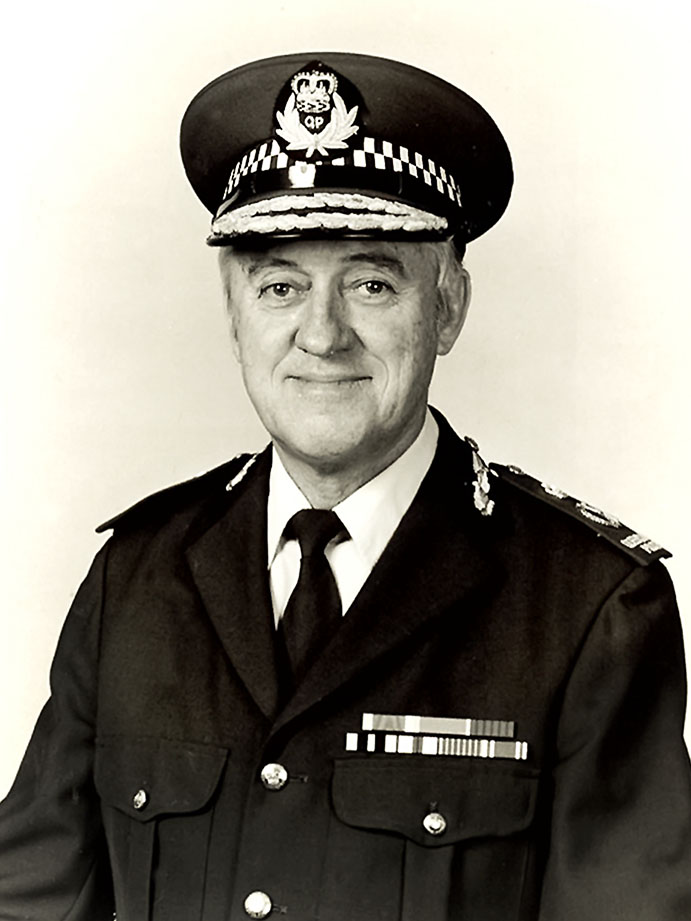

14th Commissioner of the Queensland Police Service
- In office November 1976 – September 1987
- Preceded by: Ray Whitrod
- Succeeded by: Ronald Redmond (acting)

Personal details
- Born: Terence Murray Lewis; 29 February 1928
- Died: 5 May 2023 (aged 95)
- Spouse: Hazel Catherine Lewis (m. 1952; died 2009)
- Children: 5
- Profession: Police officer

Criminal information
- Criminal information
- Status: Deceased
- Convictions: 16 counts of corruption and forgery
- Penalty: 10 1/2 years imprisonment

Terence Murray Lewis GM (29 February 1928 – 5 May 2023) was an Australian police officer who, as Commissioner of the Queensland Police Service, was convicted and jailed for corruption and forgery as a result of the Fitzgerald Inquiry. He was stripped of his knighthood and two other awards in consequence. Lewis continued to protest his innocence and sued his former lawyers and pursued appeals. The last of his appeals failed in August 2005.

== Policing career ==
=== Early career ===
Lewis was inducted as a police officer in 1949. As a senior constable, Lewis was the first officer in charge of the Juvenile Aid Bureau. He was implicated in the National Hotel scandal. Lewis was also a close associate of the corrupt former Police Commissioner Frank Bischof and was allegedly one of his bagmen. Informant Shirley Brifman said: "the collect boys were Lewis, Murphy and Hallahan. That went to Bischof."

=== Exile ===
In late 1975, then-Inspector Lewis was transferred to Charleville. At the same time, Tony Murphy was posted to Longreach. However, because Queensland Premier Joh Bjelke-Petersen was unhappy with Commissioner Whitrod, he made two trips to Charleville in March and May 1976 to talk to Lewis, who had been mentioned to him as a possible future commissioner. Two opportunities came to overthrow Commissioner Whitrod: the Premier shifting Police Minister Max Hodges into another portfolio and replacing him with Tom Newbery, and the retirement on 15 September of Assistant Commissioner Norm Gulbransen. On 15 November 1976, the State Cabinet rejected Whitrod's proposed candidates to replace Gulbransen and instead selected Lewis, who was promoted ahead of 122 officers who were equal or more senior to him.

Former Royal Commissioner Donald Stewart observed that in 1976, Lewis "was plucked from well-deserved obscurity by Premier Bjelke-Petersen to be his vassal, to do his bidding, lawful or otherwise".

== Downfall ==
Lewis served as Police Commissioner from 1976 to 1987, receiving a knighthood, but was stood down by police minister Bill Gunn on 21 September 1987 before being dismissed on 19 April 1989. By 1980, Detective Jack Herbert had become Lewis's bagman, but he later became a major informant against Lewis and others at the Fitzgerald Inquiry. Assistant Commissioner Graeme Parker also confessed to corruption and implicated Lewis on 16 September 1987.

=== Trial ===
Following the end of the Fitzgerald Inquiry, Lewis was charged in 1989 with 23 counts of perjury, corruption, and forgery. After hearing evidence over five months and having deliberated for five days, a District Court jury found that, although Lewis had not lied to the inquiry, he had accepted bribes totalling $700,000 to protect brothels, SP (starting price) bookmakers, illegal casinos, and in-line machine operators and to prevent poker machines being legally introduced in Queensland.

=== Prison ===
Judge Healy sentenced Lewis to the maximum prison term possible – 14 years on the 15 corruption charges and 10 years on the forgery charge – to be served concurrently, fixed a non-parole period of 9½ years, and fined Lewis $50,000 on each of the corruption charges. Lewis was paroled in 2002 after serving 10½ years. He maintained his innocence, suing his former lawyers and pursuing further appeals, the last of which failed in August 2005.

=== Death ===
Lewis died on 5 May 2023, at age 95.

== Awards and honours ==
Lewis received the following honours:

Knight Bachelor	1 January 1986; for his service to the Queensland Police
Officer of the Order of the British Empire (OBE)	16 June 1979
George Medal (GM)	10 May 1960; for his apprehension of an armed man, when a Senior Detective Constable, along with three other police officers. Of the other officers Detective Constable 1st Class Glen Patrick Hallahan was also awarded the GM, while Constables Kevin John Morris and James Kevin Shearer were awarded the British Empire Medal for Gallantry (Civil Division). The constables had initially attended an incident where a woman had reported that her husband was armed with a rifle, and was threatening to kill both her, and himself. The two detectives arrived later, and attempted to disarm the man, during which the gun was fired, with a shot passing between Hallahan's legs, they eventually managed to subdue the man.
Queen's Police Medal (QPM)	11 June 1977
National Medal	15 May 1986

Churchill Fellowship in 1968 for his work with the Juvenile Aid Bureau.

In March 1993 the Queen stripped Lewis of the awards of Knight Bachelor, Officer of the Order of the British Empire and Queen's Police Medal for Merit. Lewis became only the 14th person since the 14th century to be stripped of his knighthood. He retained the George Medal, which was awarded for gallantry, and the National Medal, awarded for service.

== See also ==
- Domenico Cacciola
- Francis Bischof
- Leisha Harvey
- Don Lane (politician)
- Brian Austin

Police appointments
Preceded by Ray Whitrod	Commissioner of the Queensland Police Service; 1976–1987	Succeeded by Ron Redmond
