= Domenico Cacciola =

Australian writer and police officer

Domenico Cacciola (born in 1945) is an Italian decorated police officer who joined the Queensland Police in 1966. He became an undercover detective in the 1970s. In 1977 he received the Queen's Commendation for Brave Conduct, and the National Medal (Australia) in 1991. After retiring in 2001, he wrote his memoir with the assistance of his brother Carmelo Cacciola and journalist Ben Robertson. In 2009 the University of Queensland Press published his autobiography The Second Father, which detailed how he resisted underworld crime and the corruption which was rampant within the Queensland Police until the Fitzgerald Inquiry. His second book, Who's Who in the Zoo, is an insiders story of crime and corruption in the police force, when he was a CIB and Special Branch detective.

== Early life ==
Born in Sicily in 1945, Domenico Cacciola moved with his family to Brisbane, Australia in 1954. His father ran a fruit shop in New Farm, and as the eldest of four brothers Domenico was considered the 'second father'. As a child Cacciola experienced racism and discrimination due to his heritage, which prompted his decision to apply to the Queensland Police in 1965.

== Career ==
Cacciola joined the Queensland Police in 1966 and due to his background was assigned to undercover duties investigating illegal gambling activities within the Italian community. In the 1970s he witnessed the full extent of corruption within the police force, serving under the now disgraced Sergeant Jack Herbert and former Commissioner Terry Lewis. In the late 1970s he became a Special Branch detective, spending much of his time breaking up street marches in Brisbane in what was a period of social unrest. In 1977 he received the Queen's Commendation for Brave Conduct, and the National Medal (Australia) in 1991.

== Books ==
- The Second Father: An insiders story of cops, crime and corruption (2009) ISBN 978-0-7022-3712-6
- Who's Who in the Zoo (2013)
