= The Warning (play) =

Play by Henry Bosnell

The Warning is a melodrama written by "Henry Bosnell" (or Basnell) on the subject of white slavery and promoted as a remedy to an urgent social evil. It opened at the Little Theatre, Sydney on 22 November 1913 and ran for six weeks to good houses.

== History ==
Wilton Welch's production of Henry Bosnell's play The Warning was advertised as

- Alarming in its Vivid Truths
- It is a Sermon in a Play
- Urges the necessity of immediate action

=== The author ===
By whichever spelling, Bosnell or Basnell, is a pseudonym:

Jill Nelmes and Jule Selbo, in their book Women Screenwriters: An International Guide attribute authorship of The Warning to Louise Carbasse, later known as Louise Lovely, with her husband Wilton Welch.

Jeannette Delamoir in White Slavery, Popular Culture and Modernity in Australia in 1913 concurs, crediting Carbasse and Welch, citing copyright registration documents. See External links (below). Delamoir notes the coincidental appearance at Joe Weber's Theatre in New York City of the film Traffic in Souls on the same subject.

Welch, a comedian with George Marlow's Dramatic Company and the Holloway Dramatic Company, had some form as a dramatist: he was the author of The Girl Who Loved a Soldier, which played in 1912.

=== Cast ===
The play was performed at the Little Theatre, Sydney to good houses from 22 November 1913 to 3 February 1914. List of Characters:

- June Travers (the girl): Louise Carbasse
- Mrs Travers (her mother): Clara Stephenson
- Edward Travers (a legislator): Herbert Shaw
- Madam Gourdron (keeper of the "house"): Athena Claudius
- Milly (a victim): Agnes Keogh
- Chundra (dumb attendant): John Marsh
- Bernard Stanton (agent): Arthur Styan
- Adams (another agent): James Martin
- Robert Trent (vigilance officer): Gerald Kay Souper
- Jack Mason (wireless operator): Charles Montague (perhaps C. Montague Shaw)
- Freddy Ballard (a 'pigeon'): Frederic Ward
- Detective: Robert Pollock
- Waiter (last act): Stuart Clyde
- Newsboy: Sidney Mullins

Producer: Wilton Welch

It has not been revived.

=== Scenes ===
Act I. — The Lounge, Hotel Majestic (Afternoon)

Act II.— The House of the Red Blinds (Evening)

Act III. — The Gardens, Hotel Majestic (Next day)

== Plot ==
June Travers, a country girl and daughter of a parliamentarian, is staying with her mother at an up-market hotel in the city, where she is expecting to meet a long-lost aunt. She is approached by an impostor, who lures her to the "House of Red Blinds", a brothel run by Madam Gourdron. June is guarded by Freddy Ballard, who has been blackmailed by the Madam into working for her. He tells June how she has been trapped and that escape is impossible. She advises him to go to the police, make a clean breast of his crimes, and tell them of her plight. Her innocence wins him over, and hands her a revolver to use how she may. Bernard Stanton, agent for a gang of white slavers, arrives, and when the two are alone she produces the pistol and compels him to telephone for the police. Just then, Madam Gourdron returns; there is a standoff and June is overwhelmed, falling to the floor. They realise there are watchers outside; they quickly gag her and turn off the lights. She then sees a light outside flashing the signal of distress. She leaps to the light switch and responds in kind. Trent and Mason enter and apprehend the pair. There is a happy reunion, and June's father, awakened to the peril facing Australia, resolves to make a speech in Parliament.

== Reception ==
An early reviewer accepted the need for a play of this sort, and felt the dramatist meant well, and saw powerful dramatic possibilities in the story, but the script was in dire need of the producer's scissors — there were too many periods of tiresome pedantry, and unnatural soliloquies. Of the acting, he thought Miss Carbasse, in the star role of Jane Travers, was credible, but did not immerse herself in the character. Of the supporting actors, Agnes Keogh, as an inmate of the brothel, was impressive, as was Arthur Styan, who played one of the slave-traders. Also mentioned was Charles Montague, who managed to inject personality into an otherwise uninteresting character.

As for the play itself, the first act bores somewhat, and the third is tedious. Half of the third act could well be cut. The second act teems with incident, so much so that the mind becomes surfeited. The dialogue can hardly be said to be clever, although at times it is direct enough. As a moral lesson, the drama loses its force by the glamour that is thrown over the second act.

A later review acknowledged the play's early faults, but having had a little judicious pruning, it "went with a swing". Recommendations from a few of ministers of religion would have given the attendance figures a boost as well.

== Comment ==
One reviewer thought that rather than correcting a social evil, the play was putting thoughts into empty heads:

Pretty Miss Louise Carbasse, the heroine of Henry Basnell's play, produced by her husband, Wilton Welch, is reigning like a real queen at the Little Theatre, in the some-what startling 'Warning' — a piece which appears subsequent to the event, so to speak, and which proclaims a noisy clanging of the stable-door after the horse (or the filly) has been stolen. Of course, that is not the play's fault. When Henry Basnell . . . penned his little piece, he probably had no profounder intent than to make a pot of money. Perhaps the piece provoked the disappearance [a contemporary cause celebre] who knows ? Everybody has heard the story of the Old Woman who lived in a shack, and had plenty of childer, but naught to her back. She was obliged to go out and earn the family crust, and was compelled to leave her chicks at home. When she sallied forth, she told her little kiddies on no account to go near the fire, fall down the well, — or put beans up their noses. The last was a thing that they would never have thought of; but no sooner was her back turned than they determined to find out how it felt. When the old woman returned, she found every one of her numerous brood half suffocated with a bean up every individual nostril.
