= Wilton Welch =

Australian comic actor and dramatist

Wilton Welch (born c. 1884 as William Harry Welch or William Harrie Welch, died c. 1952) was an Australian comic actor and dramatist, husband and collaborator of Louise Carbasse, best known as Louise Lovely.

== History ==
Welch was born in Cooma, New South Wales, the fourth son of Eleanor F. Welch (died 1937) and Charles Frederick Welch (died 1922), auctioneer and mayor of Cooma. Two of his brothers enlisted with the First AIF during World War I: Frank Carey Welch (c. 1896 – 26 October 1918) and Septimus Welch (c. September 1890 – 17 October 1918); who were killed within a fortnight of each other.

Welch first trod the professional stage in comic parts with the Maggie Moore Company in 1903. He was with Charles Holloway's company from 1906 followed by the Pollard Opera Company. He joined Allan Hamilton's company in 1909.

He was a member of the George Marlow Dramatic Company from 1909 to 1913, and was best remembered as "Sammy Snozzle", in The Bad Girl of the Family, but also appeared in Allan Hamilton's 1911 production of Beauty and the Barge.

Welch married Nellie Louise Carbasse (or Carbasse-Alberti), better known as Louise Carbasse, on 20 February 1912. She was the only daughter of Madame Louise Alberti of Sydney, and aged 17 to Welch's 28.

He wrote a play The Girl who Loved a Soldier, which was first staged at the Adelphi Theatre, Sydney on 27 July 1912.

He was part-author (with Carbasse) of the 1913 play The Warning which played to full houses at the Little Theatre from 22 November 1913 to 3 January 1914.

=== America ===
Welch and Carbasse left for America in December 1914, booked to appear in vaudeville on the Orpheum Circuit, later on the McIntosh circuit. The Great War was well under way, but being in the still-neutral United States, they were spared the jingoistic theatre of Australia and Britain, where plays with titles like The Slacker, The Enemy, The Coward, The Man Who Stayed at Home, My Friend Thomas Atkins, and The Contemptible Little Army were playing.

Carbasse was renamed "Louise Lovely" by the head of Universal Pictures, Carl Laemmle, in late 1915 and became a considerable star with a great number of films to her credit, mostly for the studio of William Fox. Welch found work in Hollywood as production manager for one of the units of the Robertson-Cole company and was a co-director of the Famous Players–Lasky company in 1919–1920 and both made a lot of money. He directed a Max Linder feature film at the Maurice Tourneur studios in Hollywood. They returned to Australia in August 1924, ostensibly for a holiday, but remained.

=== A Day at the Studio ===
As part of her self-proclaimed campaign to reinvigorate the Australian film industry, Carbasse (or Louise Lovely as she was known by this time) instituted a "Day at the Studio", advertised as a screen test to find undiscovered talent. With Wilton Welch as director, and a small crew, she recreated a film set on the stage of the Lyceum Theatre, Sydney in September 1924, and invited members of the audience to perform in front of "live" cameras, with the printed film shown later that week. The success of this promotion, which they had run in America, prompted follow-ups at the Majestic Theatre, Melbourne, West's Olympia Theatre, Adelaide, the Prince of Wales Theatre, Perth, Her Majesty's Theatre, Hobart in December, and finally the Winter Garden Theatre, Brisbane in January 1925.

=== Jewelled Nights ===
Back in Australia, Carbasse, or Louise Lovely as she continued to be named, was determined to be at the vanguard of a revitalised Australian film industry. The writer Marie Bjelke Petersen approached Carbasse, proposing she make a feature film of her just-published fourth novel Jewelled Nights, set in the osmiridium mining region of northwest Tasmania. Though no doubt urged by ambition for her literary career, she also saw such a film as a promotional vehicle for the island's tourist trade. On 13 December 1924 all three signed a "Memo of Agreement" for world-wide rights on the proposed film.

On 20 February 1925 the company of "Louise Lovely Picture Productions Ltd" which included her "leading man" Arthur Styan and the "villain" Godfrey Cass, boarded the SS Oonah for Launceston to begin filming; Carbasse had a boy's haircut ready for the "on location" filming, as the plot revolved around a woman dressing as a boy to work at the mine. Other scenes would be shot in Melbourne, as would editing and other work.

Filming at the Savage River and Nineteen Mile Creek locations ended in March 1925, and the company returned to Melbourne. Jewelled Nights premiered at Hoyts theatre, Melbourne on 24 October 1925 and was well received but having spent heavily on production facilities, and then failing to penetrate the American market, it failed financially.

=== Breakup ===
The Welch-Carbasse marriage had deteriorated during their residence in America, and soon after their return to Australia, Welch, wishing to be free to meet other women, moved to a different hotel. However it is also speculated that Welsh was gay. Carbasse obtained an order for him to return, and, that failing, instituted divorce proceedings on the grounds of desertion; their marriage was dissolved in November 1928. Carbasse (or Lovely) remarried later the same day.

Welch did not attend any of the legal proceedings, and from that time his name did not appear in the Australian press, meaning the hitherto "irrepressible" Welch had left for overseas for the UK in December 1926. It would appear that he established a career in the UK producing and performing in stage plays, as reported in various newspapers of the time. In 1938, he even staged his play 'A Day At The Studio', the same play that he produced for Louise Lovely. His last mention that can be verified is in the play 'The Lovely Lady' in November 1945.

It is believed he died in England in latter-1952.

== Plays ==
Welch wrote:

- The Chocolate Cream Soldier, a burlesque opera starring Maude Mortimer at the National Amphitheatre in 1912. The title may be an allusion to Shaw's Arms and the Man.
- The Wool King opened at Adelphi Theatre 31 July 1911
- The Silver Fan
- The Girl Who Loved a Soldier

Three of Welch's works were protected by copyright:

- Applicant: Wilton Welch of Sydney; Title of Work: Wool King, Dramatic Work; Date of Application: 31 July 1911; Date Copyright Registered: 18 August 1911. (Work enclosed)
- Applicant: Wilton Welch of Sydney; Title of Work: The Telephone Girls: A Novel Singing and Talking Scena for Vaudeville; Date of Application: 21 July 1913; Date Copyright Registered: 4 August 1913.(Work enclosed)
- Applicant: Wilton Welch and Louise Welch of Sydney; Title of Work: The Warning A Drama Based on White Slave Traffic; Date of Application: 29 November 1913; Date Copyright Registered: 4 December 1913. (Work enclosed)

== Films ==
Jewelled Nights (Louise Lovely, Wilton Welch, 1925) writers: Louise Lovely, Wilton Welch from novel by Marie Bjelke Petersen; production: Louise Lovely, Wilton Welch; actors: Louise Lovely, Gordon Collingridge, Godfrey Cass; theme: osmiridium mining in Tasmania.
