= Frederick Ward (theatre) =

Anglo-Australian actor and theatre manager

Frederick Ward (born 1887) was an English-born actor and theatre manager in Australia. He founded Sydney's first repertory theatre.

== History ==
Ward was born in London and educated at Surry [sic] College, followed by London University, graduating B.A. in 1907. He worked in London County Council architect's department for three years. He served as private secretary to C. Birch Crisp, a London financier, for a few years, accompanying him on his various travels. Next he was private secretary to Sir James Mills KCMG, managing director of the Union Steamship Line, in which capacity Ward came to Sydney around 1912, and remained in Australia, taking whatever acting part he could land. In England he had been a director of "The Connoisseurs", an English repertory company, a member of the Council of Amateur Dramatic Clubs, and editor of The Prompter, a magazine devoted to amateur theatre. He had written several plays, including The Legacy which was produced in Manchester by Annie Horniman, and later in Germany. He helped establish a repertory theatre in Dunedin, New Zealand, but none of this helped gain a foothold in Australia. He took any on-stage work he could find, from an extra ("extra gentleman") with Lewis Waller's Company to a comedian's "patsy". He wrote a play and recruited a company to produce it, but could not find an "angel" to provide the necessary finance.

He joined the Sydney Repertory Society, which took over Federation Hall, Grosvenor Street, Sydney, to become Sydney Repertory Theatre, opened 31 May 1913.

In November 1913 he had a part in Carbasse and Welch's production of the melodrama The Warning at the Little Theatre. to packed houses. He gained further public acceptance with Muriel Starr's drama company in its 1913–1915 Australian tour. He had only minor roles, but one night he got to play "Raymond Floriot" in her 1914 production of Madame X, and won the part.

In May 1914 Ward and G. Kay Souper (Note: Gerald Kay Souper (1871–1947) left Australia in August 1930, appeared as Colonel Boisdeffre in the film Dreyfus. His daughter Eileen Kay Souper was in repertory with Gregan McMahon; also went overseas to pursue an acting career.) opened a Dramatic Academy, at Penzance Chambers, Elizabeth Street, Sydney. Dubbed "the only bijou theatre in Sydney", in May 1915 it became the clubrooms for the Arts and Dramatic Club, founded by Ward.

Later in 1914 he joined Reynolds Denniston's Country Amusements Ltd touring company, playing in Nobody's Daughter and The Rosary.

Ward wrote a play, Little Sloe Eyes, which was performed at the Sydney Repertory Society's 1915 A.G.M. His Little Theatre Company folded in April 1915, and his and Souper's acting academy re-emerged. The Society staged Hindle Wakes at the Repertory Theatre in June.

In March 1916 Ward leased the Little Theatre, where he first produced Julia Seton's polemical New Thought play, The Victory. Pinero's The Second Mrs Tanqueray followed, starring Eily Malyon as Paula and Esther Mitchell as Ellean, to great acclaim. Hindle Wakes, The Critic, and The New Sin followed, all critical successes but financial failures.

In 1917 he directed, and played a comic part in, The Rajah of Shivapore for Sydney James (Note: Sydney James (c. 1879 – 16 July 1919), English actor and ventriloquist (with dummy "Billy"), toured Australia 1914–1918 with his "Royal Strollers"; after some changes renamed "Pierrot Pie" touring Asia, died of peritonitis in Karachi.) at the Playhouse.

In 1922 he tried running poultry at Manor Farm, Carlingford, but he lost everything in the endeavour.

For three years he edited Everyone's, a weekly devoted to the entertainment industry, and in 1927 acted as publicity manager for Eva Novak, who was making a picture The Romance of Runnibede in Queensland, then he accepted the position of publicity director for Cinema Art Films Limited, which had dealings with Hoyt's Theatres Limited.

He was appointed resident manager in Adelaide (Note: While in Adelaide they occupied the 38 Grove Street, Unley Park residence of Otto Schomburgk, who was travelling the world, and entertained lavishly, becoming friends of their neighbour, Tom O'Halloran KC.) for Hoyt's Limited, and was director of publicity at the newly opened Regent Theatre, Adelaide. During this period, 1928–1935, he was editor of The Regent magazine, another trade paper.

In 1934 he was partner with John Longden in a company formed to film Highway Romance,

He was producer for the Hordernian Society, an amateur theatre company associated with the Hordern emporium staff club.

In 1937 he was engaged by Commonwealth Theatres Pty Ltd, as tour manager for their "Thirty Young Australians" revue.

== Mrs Ward ==
Ward married a New South Wales girl Beatrice Helene, surname not yet found, sometime before 1918. Mrs Ward was an occasional producer of plays for charity, and active in Adelaide's social scene 1928–1930. While resident in Adelaide, Mrs Ward gave lessons in voice production and stage deportment. Enigmatically described as "general necromancer, soothsayer, and eccentric dancer", she danced and sang in at least one production of Alfred Hill's The Rajah of Shivapore.
