= Frank Crossley =

Frank Crossley may refer to:

- Frank Crossley (materials scientist), American engineer and pioneer in the field of titanium metallurgy
- Frank Crossley (actor), Australian comedian
- Francis Crossley, known as Frank Crossley, British carpet manufacturer, philanthropist and politician
