= Standard Theatre =

Standard Theatre or Standard Theater may refer to:

in Australia

- Royal Standard Theatre, in Sydney, known as "Standard Theatre", since demolished

in Canada;

- Standard Theatre (Toronto, Ontario)

in the United States

- Standard Theatre, early name of the Manhattan Theatre, New York
- Standard Theatre (Kansas City, Missouri), also known as Folly Theatre, listed on the NRHP in Missouri
- Standard Theatre (Philadelphia), a venue showcasing black performers and jazz musicians 1888–1931, then a movie theater
