= The Girl Who Loved a Soldier =

1912 Australian play by Wilton Welch

The Girl Who Loved a Soldier was an Australian stage play written by Wilton Welch. It has been credited as the first Australian play to be set in a city.

== History ==
Welch put the finishing touches to the play while he was engaged at the Adelphi Theatre, Sydney, playing the part of "Snoozle" in The Bad Girl of the Family. It opened at the Adelphi on 27 July 1912 for George Marlow Ltd. and ran for three weeks; its last night was 16 August. It was performed by Marlow's company in Melbourne the following year, opening at the Princess Theatre on 12 July 1913 to good reviews and closed on 25 July.

== The play ==
=== Plot ===
Wilfred Grant, the villain of the piece, is a wealthy stockbroker who seeks to marry Violet Donald, who finds him repulsive. In order to achieve his ends he falsifies her father's stock records to make him appear insolvent, but promises Violet he would assist him if she would marry him. She accedes for love of her father, but in a farcical scene is foiled by the Boy Scout, who disguises himself as the bride-to-be. Richard Scott, the hero, is a gentleman in love with Violet, but could not propose because he has lost all his money through gambling and generosity, and to support himself has joined the army. He designs a submarine, which is likely to make his fortune and so enable him to marry Violet. Grant, in an attempt to be rid of his rival, plants a bomb in the submarine, destroying it but Scott is unharmed, and gains the support of Colonel Anstruther. Grant is exposed as a fraud and saboteur, and is sentenced to imprisonment in Darlinghurst Gaol, from which he subsequently escapes. He is caught, however, and the troubles of the hero and heroine are over.

=== Programme ===
ACT I. Scene 1— The Grange, Darling Point, Sydney. Scene 2— The Main Gate, Victoria Barracks, Paddington. Scene 3— Wilfred Grant's Flat, Macquarie-street

ACT II. Scene 1 — The Drawingroom, The Grange. Scene 2 — Queen's-square, Sydney, Scene 3— The Main Gate, Victoria Barracks. Scene 4— St. Andrew's Cathedral, Sydney.

ACT III. Scene 1— The Barracks Square, Victoria Barracks. Scene 2— Man o' War Steps, Farm Cove, Sydney. Scene 3— Submarine Headquarters, Chowder Bay. Scene 4— The Great Scenic Tableau. Under Sydney Harbor. The Wrecked Submarine.

ACT IV. Scene 1— The Exercise Yard, Darlinghurst Gaol. Scene 2— The Outside of Darlinghurst Gaol. Scene 3— A Street near the Gaol. Scene 4 — The Grange, Darling Point.

=== Cast ===
Sydney:

- Richard Scott (the soldier): Hugh Buckler
- Violet Donald (the girl): Violet Paget
- Angas Donald (retired squatter): John Dunce
- Colonel Anstruther: Charles Lawrence
- Wilfred Grant: (the villain) Godfrey Cass
- Shadder Bloggs: (rabbit vendor) D'Arcy Kelway
- Olga Lazaroff: (a foreign spy) Jennie Pollock
- Isaac Rubenstein: Frank Reis
- Toby Trackem (Boy Scout): Wilton Welch
- Lily Lovell (Girl Guide): Elwyn Harvey

Melbourne:

- Richard Scott (the soldier): George Cross
- Violet Donald (the girl): Essie Clay
- Colonel Anstruther: Wernham Ryott
- Wilfred Grant: T. W. Lloyd
- Shadder Bloggs: Marcus St John
- Olga Lazaroff: Agnes Keogh
- Isaac Rubinstein: Frank Reis
- Toby Trackem (Boy Scout): Frank Crossley
- Lily Lovell (Girl Guide): Florence Gleeson

== Reviews ==
Reviewers found the play a typical melodrama that breaks no new ground, but enjoyable nonetheless; with the usual thrills and unlikely situations, a dash of humor and a satisfying conclusion. The play was well performed to good houses. Another reviewer poked gentle fun at the incongruities, absurdities and ridiculous situations, giving warm praise to several actors, and greatest recommendation to the scene paintings by A. and G. Clint and J. S. Mann, in an era when stage scenery was an important art form.
