= Louise Hampton =

British actress (1879–1954)

- Born: 23 December 1879; Stockport, Cheshire, England
- Died: 10 February 1954 (aged 74); London, England
- Occupation: Actress
- Years active: 1911–1954

Louise Hampton (23 December 1879 – 10 February 1954) was a British actress. Although her career began when she was a child, it was for "the pathos and dignity of her elderly, motherly roles" that she was best known.

== Life and career ==
=== Early years ===
Hampton was born in Stockport, Cheshire, the daughter of the actor Henry Hampton and his wife, Margaret (née Douglas). She made her stage debut at the age of four at the Queen's Theatre, Manchester as Henri, the child in Belphegor. In 1899, she married the actor Edward Thane (1873–1954). In 1911, she toured Australia under the management of George Marlow, in a repertory of melodramas. In November 1912, she played Wanda in The People's King, and in 1913 she toured in Egypt, playing leading parts in a repertory company. In 1914–15 she toured Britain in The Blindness of Virtue, The Second Mrs. Tanqueray (in the title role) and Outcast. Her first London appearance was at the Court Theatre in February 1917, where she appeared as Mrs Benson in Ruts, in a cast that included Hilda Trevelyan, Sydney Fairbrother, Lydia Bilbrooke and Nina Boucicault.

=== West End roles ===
As Miss Prism in The Importance of Being Earnest, with Leslie Faber (centre) as Jack and H. O. Nicholson as Dr Chasuble

After her success in Ruts at the Court, Hampton began a long series of London parts. According to The Stage, some of her outstanding roles were Mrs Jones in The Silver Box (Court, 1922), Elizabeth Channing in Secrets (Comedy Theatre, 1922), Miss Prism in The Importance of Being Earnest (Haymarket Theatre, 1923), Margaret Heal in The Fanatics (Ambassadors Theatre, 1927), Mrs Pembroke in Nine Till Six (Apollo, 1930), Charlotte Ardsley in For Services Rendered (Globe Theatre, 1932), Mrs Alving in Ghosts (Arts Theatre, 1933), Mrs Haggett in The Late Christopher Bean (St James's Theatre, 1933). Madam Wang in Lady Precious Stream (Little Theatre, 1934), Vicky Benton in Living Room (Garrick Theatre, 1943). and Mrs Borkman in John Gabriel Borkman (Arts, 1950).

Several newspapers called Hampton "everybody's favourite mother". The Times commented that she would be remembered particularly for her performance as "the weary, kindly, heartbroken woman who runs a shop" in Nine Till Six, in the title role of Čapek's The Mother, and for "her exquisite portrait … of a woman whose upbringing and memories enable her to meet death with smiling dignity" in For Services Rendered.

Her last role, a few weeks before she died, was as the Mother Superior in "The Return" at the Q Theatre. Her husband, Edward Thane, predeceased her by three weeks. She died in Charing Cross Hospital, London, on 10 February 1954.

=== Films ===
Hampton appeared in a variety of film roles. She made her film debut in 1911, in the silent thriller Driving a Girl to Destruction. This was the first of many film appearances over the years, often latterly in supporting roles.

==== Partial filmography ====
- Brown Sugar (1922) – Miss Gibson
- The Eleventh Commandment (1924) – Lady Barchester
- Nine till Six (1932) – Madam
- His Lordship Goes to Press (1939) – Mrs. Hodges
- Hell's Cargo (1939) – civil defense warden
- Goodbye, Mr. Chips (1939) – Mrs. Wickett
- The Middle Watch (1940) – Charlotte Hopkinson
- Busman's Honeymoon (1940) – Mrs. Ruddle
- The House of the Arrow (1940) – Mme. Harlow
- The Saint Meets the Tiger (1943) – Aunt Agatha Gurten
- Bedelia (1946) – Hannah
- Files from Scotland Yard (1951) – Agatha Steele
- Scrooge (1951) – Laundress
- The Story of Robin Hood and His Merrie Men (1952) – Tyb
- The Oracle (1953) – Miss Turner
- Background (1953) – Miss Russell
- Strange Experiences (1956) – The Actress

== Death ==
Hampton died on 10 February 1954 in London, at the age of 74.

== Notes, references and sources ==
=== Sources ===
- Parker, John; Freda Gaye; Ian Herbert (1978). Who Was Who in the Theatre. Detroit: Gale Research. OCLC 310466458.
