= Angel of his Dreams =

1912 film by George Marlow

- Directed by: George Marlow
- Based on: Play
- Produced by: George Marlow
- Starring: Members of George Marlow Dramatic Company
- Cinematography: Bert Ive
- Production company: Australian Picturised Drama Cpmany
- Release date: 1912
- Country: Australia
- Languages: Silent film English intertitles

Angel of his Dreams is a 1912 Australian film directed by George Marlow about a woman who seduces a clergyman.

It was Marlow's follow up to Driving a Girl to Destruction.

The film had been performed by Marlow.

Filming took place in December 1911.
