= The Rajah of Shivapore =

1917 comic opera by Alfred Hill and David Souter

The Rajah of Shivapore is a comic opera with music by Alfred Hill and libretto by David Souter.

== The story ==
Setting: India

The temple to Shiva at Shivapore has been barricaded by the corrupt tippler temple-keeper Chunder, to hide the fact that he has pawned the little golden idol. His only hope of escaping retribution is to persuade his lovely but reluctant daughter, Aimee, to marry the Rajah after somehow disposing of his Ranee. Another rogue, the necromancer Bunder, has his own cunning plan, which involves exchanging the idol with a cheap replica. Aimee's vagabond lover Jengis thwarts both plans by impersonating the god, and so wins the girl. The Rajah, who has not only been cheated of his prize but also defrauded, orders decapitations all round, but then a supposed Hindustani beggar reveals himself as the Emperor, and everyone gets their just dues.

== The songs (Note: This list has been compiled from newspaper reports and is not definitive.) ==
"Just One of the Girls" (Bul-Bul)
"What's a Maid to Do ?" (Bul-Bul)
"Sad is the Heart" (Aimee)
"Heigho" (Aimee)
"Versatility"
"Coughdrop"
"The Wine of Joy" (Jengis)
"Sword of Mine" (Jengis)
"Maid of the Dear Eyes" (The Rajah)
"But Yesterday" (Jengis and Aimee)
"Love it is the Song" (Jengis and Aimee)
"My Beloved" (Jengis and Aimee)

also

Traditional Indian chant (The Rajah)

== Premiere ==
It was first performed at The Playhouse, Sydney from 15 December 1917 to 5 January 1918; produced by Sydney James, (Note: Sydney James (c. 1879 – 16 July 1919), English actor and ventriloquist (with dummy "Billy"), toured Australia 1914–1918 with his "Royal Strollers"; after some changes renamed "Pierrot Pie" for its Asian tour, died of peritonitis in Karachi.) of "Royal Strollers" fame, and directed by Frederick Ward.

=== Personnel ===
- Aimee, the temple-keeper's daughter — Miss Alice Bennetto
- Jengis (or Zengis), the handsome troubador — John Quinlan
- The Rajah — George Whitehead
- Chunder, the corrupt temple-keeper – Frank Hawthorne
- Bunder, the scheming necromancer – Frederick Ward
- The Emperor – David Drayton
- Bul-Bul, temple attendant — Miss Vera Spaull, her first appearance in an adult role

plus chorus and dancers

- Costume design — David Souter
- Scenic design — Jack Mann
- Fight choreography — Frank Stewart, of Sydney Swords Club

=== Reception ===
Despite wartime constraints, the opera was received enthusiastically by the first-night audience which, in that tiny auditorium, consisted largely of knowledgeable theatregoers and music lovers.

== Later performances ==
- Brisbane (12–19 January 1918) at His Majesty's Theatre
- Toowoomba (21, 22 January 1918) at the Town Hall. A poor turnout was attributed to wet weather.
- Melbourne (9 February 1918 – 2 March 1918) at the Princess Theatre.

Two sensations marked this production: Frank Grahame (real name Ernest William Gollmick), who was to play the Rajah, was charged with deserting his children, but was given bail so he could perform at the opening night, and Robert Colville (real name Bert Coghlan) collapsed and died at an after-show party on 24 February.

Hill stated in 1959, aged 89, that he was revising the work.
