= Eily Malyon =

British actress

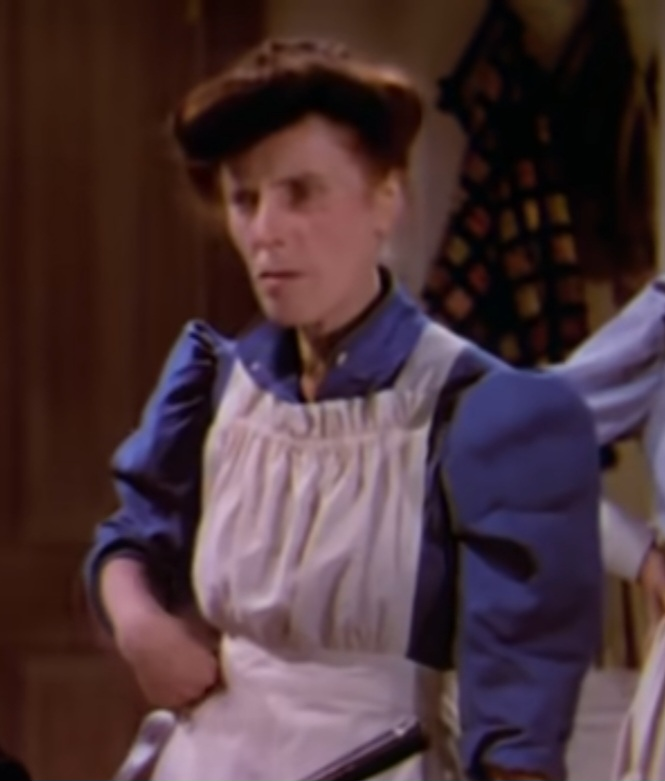
- Malyon in The Little Princess (1939)
- Born: Eily Sophie Lees Craston; 30 October 1879; London, England
- Died: 26 September 1961 (aged 81); South Pasadena, California, U.S.
- Other names: Eily Craston
- Occupation: Character actress
- Years active: 1930s–1940s
- Spouse: Joshua Plumpton Wilson (m. 1911; div. 1922)

Eily Malyon (born Eily Sophie Lees-Craston; 30 October 1879 – 26 September 1961) was an English character actress from about 1900 to the 1940s. She had a stage career in Britain, Australia and America before moving to Hollywood to perform in motion pictures.

== Biography ==
Malyon was born in the London district of Islington in 1879, the daughter of Harry Craston, a master boot and lawn tennis shoe manufacturer, and his wife. Her parents divorced in 1882, and she accompanied her mother, the actress Agnes Thomas, touring the world. Consequently she received much of her education in convent schools in Belgium, England and America. She so enjoyed her stay at the Ursuline convents near Liège and Visé that she resolved to become a nun, but changed her mind after experience as understudy to her mother at Drury Lane.

She gained further experience in repertory with the Stage Society in London. She spent some time in Australia, initially as a member of Ethel Irving's company, brought to Melbourne in 1911 by J. C. Williamson to play The Witness for the Defence, then played for Williamson in an English comedy company touring Milestones, in the role of Rose Sibley.

She played in repertory and at the Little Theatre for Frederick Ward in Sydney 1915–1916 and for Gregan McMahon in Melbourne 1916–1918. She left Australia for a career on the American stage in September 1925.

== Personal life ==
Malyon married Joshua Plumpton Wilson in Melbourne, Australia, on 9 December 1911. They divorced in May 1922.

== Partial filmography ==
- Born to Love (1931) - Nurse (uncredited)
- Lovers Courageous (1932) - Landlady (uncredited)
- The Wet Parade (1932) - Irish Drunk's Wife (uncredited)
- Night Court (1932) - Hungry Woman in Court (uncredited)
- Rasputin and the Empress (1932) - Woman Yelling 'Blessed Among Women!' (uncredited)
- Today We Live (1933) - Wendy, the Maid (uncredited)
- Looking Forward (1933) - Mrs. Munsey (uncredited)
- Eight Girls in a Boat (1934) - Teacher (uncredited)
- Nana (1934) - Nana's First Employer (uncredited)
- His Greatest Gamble (1934) - Jenny
- Great Expectations (1934) - Sarah Pocket
- Limehouse Blues (1934) - Woman Who Finds Pug (uncredited)
- Forsaking All Others (1934) - Mrs. Gordon - Customer (uncredited)
- The Little Minister (1934) - Evalina
- Romance in Manhattan (1935) - Miss Evans
- Clive of India (1935) - Mrs. Clifford
- The Florentine Dagger (1935) - Frau Fredericka
- Les Misérables (1935) - Mother Superior
- Mark of the Vampire (1935) - Sick Woman (scenes deleted)
- The Flame Within (1935) - Murdock, Lillian's Housekeeper
- The Farmer Takes a Wife (1935) - Angus' Wife (uncredited)
- Diamond Jim (1935) - Organist (uncredited)
- The Melody Lingers On (1935) - Sister Maria
- I Found Stella Parish (1935) - Ship's Clothing Clerk (uncredited)
- Kind Lady (1935) - Mrs. Edwards
- Ah, Wilderness! (1935) - Nora - the Maid (uncredited)
- A Tale of Two Cities (1935) - Mrs. Cruncher
- The Widow from Monte Carlo (1935) - Lady Maynard
- Little Lord Fauntleroy (1936) - Landlady
- Dracula's Daughter (1936) - Miss Peabody - Nurse (uncredited)
- One Rainy Afternoon (1936) - President of Purity League
- The White Angel (1936) - Sister Colomba
- The Devil-Doll (1936) - Laundry Proprietress (uncredited)
- Anthony Adverse (1936) - Mother Superior
- A Woman Rebels (1936) - Miss Piper (uncredited)
- Three Men on a Horse (1936) - Miss Burns
- Camille (1936) - Therese - Maid in Country House (uncredited)
- Career Woman (1936) - Miss Brinkerhoff
- God's Country and the Woman (1937) - Mrs. Higgenbottom (uncredited)
- That I May Live (1937) - Cally Plivens (uncredited)
- Night Must Fall (1937) - Nurse
- Parnell (1937) - Irish Woman with Dead Child (uncredited)
- Another Dawn (1937) - Mrs. Farnold
- Rebecca of Sunnybrook Farm (1938) - Mrs. Turner
- Kidnapped (1938) - Mrs. Campbell
- The Young in Heart (1938) - Sarah
- The Little Princess (1939) - Cook
- The Hound of the Baskervilles (1939) - Mrs. Barryman
- The Night Riders (1939) - Aunt Martha (uncredited)
- Confessions of a Nazi Spy (1939) - Mrs. McLaughlin
- On Borrowed Time (1939) - Demetria Riffle
- Sabotage (1939) - Woman Standing Behind Henry and Laura
- We Are Not Alone (1939) - Archdeacon's Wife
- Barricade (1939) - Mrs. Little - Head of Mission
- Young Tom Edison (1940) - Miss Lavina Howard, School Teacher
- Untamed (1940) - Mrs. Sarah McGavity
- Foreign Correspondent (1940) - College Arms Hotel Cashier (uncredited)
- Flowing Gold (1940) - Cashier (uncredited)
- Arkansas Judge (1941) - Widow Smithers
- Reaching for the Sun (1941) - Landlady
- Man Hunt (1941) - Lyme Regis Postmistress
- Hit the Road (1941) - Cathy Crookshank
- You're Telling Me (1942) - Mrs. Appleby
- The Man in the Trunk (1942) - Abbie Addison
- Scattergood Survives a Murder (1942) - Mrs. Grimes
- I Married a Witch (1942) - Tabitha Wooley
- The Undying Monster (1942) - Mrs. Walton (uncredited)
- Shadow of a Doubt (1943) - Mrs. Cochran (uncredited)
- Above Suspicion (1943) - Walmer Hotel Proprietess (uncredited)
- The Man from Down Under (1943) - Sarah - Aggie's Maid (uncredited)
- Jane Eyre (1943) - Mrs. Skatcher (uncredited)
- Going My Way (1944) - Mrs. Carmody
- The Seventh Cross (1944) - Fraulein Bachmann
- Grissly's Millions (1945) - Mattie
- Roughly Speaking (1945) - The Dean (uncredited)
- Son of Lassie (1945) - Washwoman
- Scared Stiff (1945) - Mrs. Cooke
- Paris Underground (1945) - Madame Martin
- She Wouldn't Say Yes (1945) - Spinster on Train (uncredited)
- Devotion (1946) - Mrs. Thornton's Friend at the Ball (uncredited)
- She-Wolf of London (1946) - Hannah
- The Secret Heart (1946) - Miss Hunter
- The Challenge (1948) - Kitty Fyffe (final film role)
