= Beatrice Denver Holloway =

Australian actress

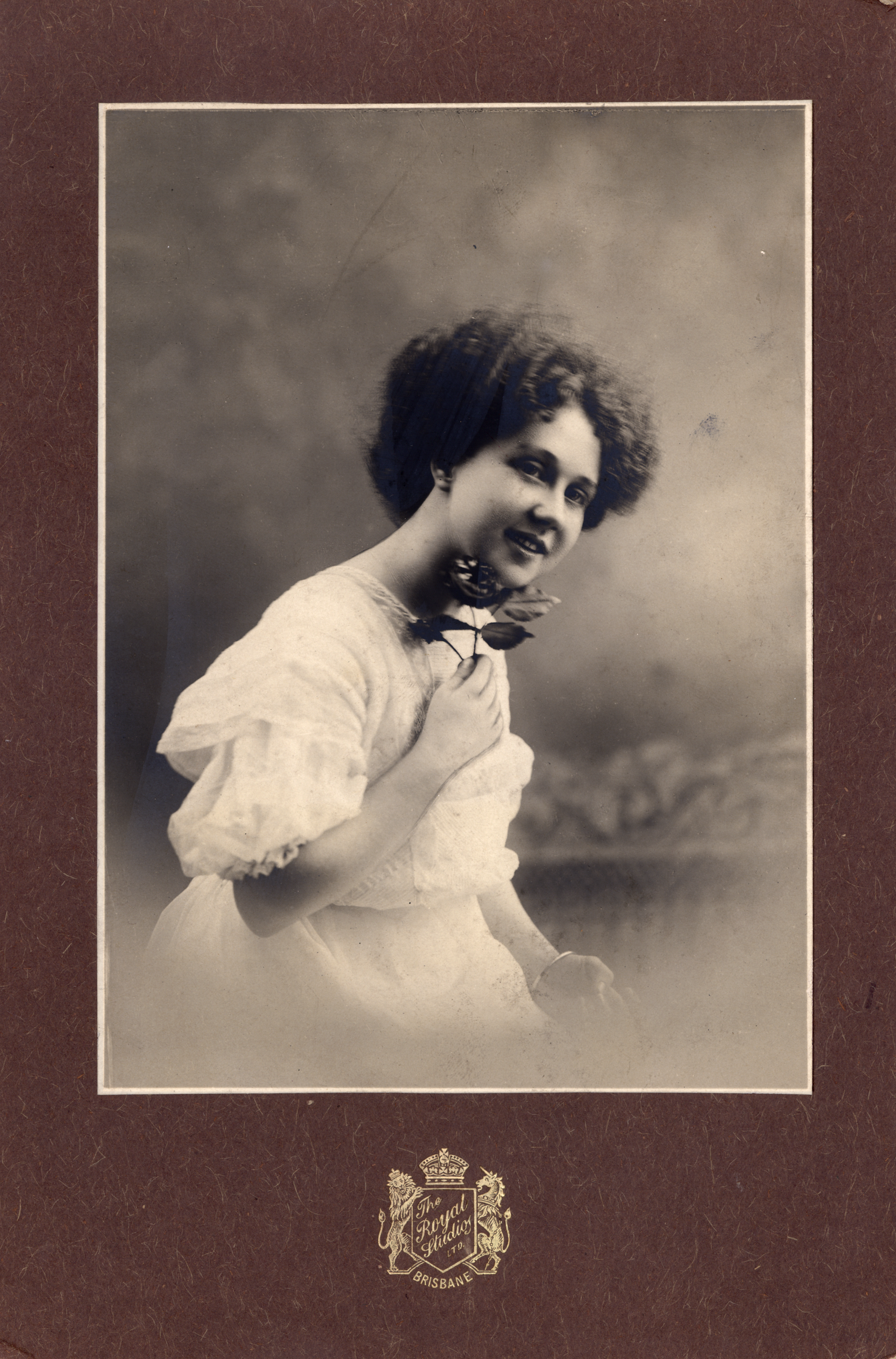
- circa 1908 (The Royal Studios' photographer)
- Born: 12 October 1884
- Died: 22 November 1964 (aged 80)
- Other names: Beatrice Holloway
- Occupation: actress
- Spouse: Robert Greig

Beatrice Denver Holloway (12 October 1884 – 22 November 1964) was an Australian actress, born into the theatrical Holloway family (Holloway Theatrical Company) of Melbourne. Her father was well-known actor-manager Charles Holloway and her mother Alice Victoria Hayward (who performed under the name Alice Deorwyn). Holloway's stage career spanned over three decades until it was cut short when she moved to Hollywood with her actor husband Robert Greig.

== The early years ==
Holloway made an early debut on stage in Melbourne with her father's Holloway Dramatic Company in 1894 in The World Against Her. A theatre critic commented on her performance saying Holloway "played with natural intelligence and utter absence of self-consciousness, quite remarkable for a little girl of 7. She played with an easy grace that shows she inherits the talents of her parents and that she has been carefully trained." While her parents toured the country performing, Holloway spent her school years living with her uncle George Frederick Holloway in Mosman, attending the nearby Redlands School. From an early age she showed an interest in performing and credits her father with teaching her acting skills. Holloway was regularly on the stage from 1904 and notably appearing in The Young Vagabond at the Criterion Theatre in Sydney in 1906.

As early as 1907, a theatre critic for Stage and Spectacle described Holloway as 'young and ingenuous in her earnest effort, her fresh simplicity, her manner devoid of mannerisms. Her aspirations are legitimate.'

In 1911 she met her future husband Robert Greig. They first performed together in Beauty and the Barge and it was the start of a successful partnership. They married in December 1912 in Melbourne and Holloway was given away by the recently arrived American actor, Fred Niblo. Their wedding excited interest in the media as both Beatrice and Bob were theatrical celebrities. Melbourne Punch covered the story and published photos of the wedding party. Niblo and Holloway had met while preparing for George M. Cohan's Get-Rich-Quick Wallingford which had its Australian premiere at the Criterion Theatre in Sydney, in August 1912 and later became a movie.

== The war years ==
Holloway came to the notice of audiences during the war years. Despite the expense and difficulty associated with bringing well-known actors from overseas, the Australian theatre thrived during the war years. Holloway was among a group of young Australians who showed that they also had what it took to impress local audiences. Holloway was performing with other Australian actors such as Gladys Moncrieff, Vera Pearce, Clyde Cook and Robert Greig, who had become her husband in 1912.

== Post-war years and moving to Hollywood ==
As early as 1920, Greig was already keen to take their acting talents overseas and he and Holloway left for England in 1920 to attend to Tivoli Theatre business, returning to Melbourne via America. Holloway found the trip 'heavenly' and revelled in visiting London, Paris, Monte Carlo and New York. In London they discovered that actors were paid well and this could have been the start of their restlessness. Before they finally left Australia, never to return, the pair followed a busy schedule, appearing in Brisbane at the Cremorne Theatre, Brisbane for a season of the farce Baby Mine. In 1925 Greig had the chance to perform at the Garrick Theatre in Philadelphia in A Night Out, but not Beatrice. In 1927, Holloway and Greig were performing together again. They opened at the Rialto in Manly, NSW, in Seven Keys to Baldpate. In 1928 they set sail for New York where Greig was cast as Hives the Butler, a straight role he was to reprieve the following year in the Marx Brothers' film Animal Crackers. This was the start of a series of typecast roles he would play for the next 30 years. For Beatrice, there were no such opportunities, and once they settled in Hollywood, it would appear she did not have the opportunity to act for the rest of her life.
