= Charles Holloway (stage) =

Stage actor and manager in Australia

Charles Holloway (1848 – 29 November 1908) was a stage actor and manager in Australia.

== History ==
Holloway was born the youngest son of William Michael Holloway and Emma Holloway née Symonds. He grew up in the Goulburn district of New South Wales, and was an active member of the Goulburn Amateur Dramatic Club, whose members included J. J. "Jack" Kennedy (April 1857 – 22 May 1896).

For many years he was a prominent member of Bland Holt's company at the Theatre Royal. He was in 1884 a member of the cast for the premiere season of Charles Darrell's The Sunny South at the Melbourne Opera House.

In 1887 he formed the Charles Holloway Dramatic Company, playing drama such as Sims and Buchanan's The English Rose, then turned to comedy and melodrama with Pinero's The Magistrate, Frank Harvey's melodramas Judge Not, and Ring of Iron.

He was joined in management of the company by C. B. Westmacott, then in 1895 by William Anderson at the Alexandra Theatre, Melbourne, employing scenery by John Hennings. They played Landeck's My Jack and A King of Crime, Maskery and Callender's True as Steel, Holcroft'sThe Broad Arrow, Harvey's The World Against Her, Wilton Jones' A Yorkshire Lass, Reynolds' The Shamrock and the Rose, (Note: Reynolds gained fame of a sort for his Young England, known as the "worst play of all time", but attracting audiences who repeatedly attended to enjoy its absurdities and interject their own witticisms.) Charles Darrell's When London Sleeps (later a movie). Actors they engaged included Maggie Moore, Frank Crossley, Ethel Buckley, Eugenie Duggan, Edwin Campbell, and of course took many starring parts themselves. The Holloway-Anderson partnership petered out around 1897, but was not dissolved until a few years later. Anderson married Eugenie Duggan and kept most of the company and prospered.

Holloway's last productions included Herbert Leonard's The Merciless World, Charles Darrell's The Power and the Glory and Defender of the Faith.

He died of double pneumonia at Dr O'Hara's private hospital in Melbourne, having travelled to that city to see his daughter Beatrice Denver Holloway play the lead in D'Ennery and Cormon's The Two Orphans.

== Family ==
Holloway married the actress Alice Victoria Hayward, née Deorwyn (stage name Alice Deorwyn).

- Their only child, Beatrice Denver Holloway (12 October 1884 – 22 November 1964) married Robert Greig and moved to Hollywood.

Alice was a daughter of John Hayward Deorwyn (c. 1823 – 6 August 1888), actor and founding member of Melbourne's original Garrick Club. Alice's sister, Constance "Katherine" Deorwyn (1860 – 29 July 1942), married Richard Stewart's son, Richard Stewart, Jun. (1861–1943).

William James Holloway (c. 1843 – April 1913), adoptive father of "Essie Jenyns" (1864 – 6 August 1920), (Jesse) George Holloway (14 May 1847 – 1928), orchardist of Goulburn, and George Frederick Holloway (c. 1854 – 9 December 1943) were brothers.

The actor Edmund Holloway was not related.
