= The Life's Romance of Adam Lindsay Gordon =

The Life of Adam Lindsay Gordon
- Still from film
- Directed by: W. J. Lincoln
- Written by: W. J. Lincoln; G.H. Barnes
- Produced by: W. J. Lincoln; G.H. Barnes
- Starring: Hugh McCrae; Adele Inman; Audrey Worth
- Cinematography: Bert Ive
- Production company: Lincoln-Barnes Scenarios
- Release dates: 17 August 1916 (preview) 4 September 1916 (Melbourne)
- Running time: 5 reels – 5,000 feet (3 reels survive)
- Country: Australia
- Languages: Silent film English intertitles

The Life's Romance of Adam Lindsay Gordon is a 1916 Australian feature-length film directed by W. J. Lincoln, based on the life of poet Adam Lindsay Gordon.

Unlike many Australian silent movies, part of the film survives today.

According to Lincoln's obituary in The Bulletin it was one of Lincoln's best films.

== Plot ==
The story starts with Gordon's schooldays at Cheltenham College. Then details his career as a trooper in the Australian bush when he is given the task of escorting a lunatic to an asylum 200 miles away. He later resigns from the police force when he refuses to clean the sergeant's boots. He then becomes a horsebreaker and steeplechase rider.

Later, Gordon falls into debt and decides to shoot himself. The final scene is a shot of Gordon's grave in Brighton, Victoria.

The chapters were as follows:

- Gordon's youth – Cheltenham College, England
- Dormitory delights
- Abduction of "Lallah Rooks"
- The hum of hoarse cheering
- Gordon wins the Point to Point
- The headmaster hears of the race
- Captain Gordon despairs of his son
- How a man should uphold the sports of his land
- Gordon fights and knocks out a bully
- Gordon is expelled from college
- Gordon's first love story
- Gordon meets Jane Bridges
- A wild west country ball
- Gordon falls in love with Jane
- Mrs Gordon chides her son concerning Jane
- Gordon announces his love and defies his parents
- Gordon puts his fate to the test
- Gordon's clandestine visit to Jane
- Gordon declares his love for Jane
- Gordon parting from Jane
- Gordon leaves England
- On board the outward bound vessel
- The Land of gold – Australia
- Gordon in Australia
- Gordon joins the mounted police
- Gordon arrests the circus clown in error
- An amusing denouement
- Gordon meets Trainor
- The beginning of a lifelong friendship
- A maniac at large
- Gordon attempts his capture singlehanded
- Gordon captures maniac and seals his fate
- A dramatic meeting
- Gordon encounters Maggie Park
- His Australian romance
- Gordon escorts maniac 200 miles
- Bush camp fire – memories
- Maniac attempts Gordon's life
- Gordon's miraculous escape
- Gordon resigns from the police
- Gordon again meets Trainor
- Their horsebreaking career
- Gordon meets Maggie Park a second time
- Gordon engaged on Park Station
- A country steeplechase
- Gordon falls in is severely injured
- Nursed back to life by Maggie
- Gordon declares his love
- They ride eighty miles to the nearest church
- Gordon and Maggie are married
- Scene from the Wreck
- The midnight ride along Northumberland Road
- Down with the sliprails
- Gallop for your souls
- Two years later at Mount Gambier
- The bailiff in the home
- Gordon in adversity
- The £7000 legacy
- Fortune comes to Gordon
- Gordon and party on "pounding" expedition
- Gordon's famous leap near the Blue Lake
- The Blue Lake, Mount Gambier
- Gordon engaged to ride Prince Rupert
- Gordon intimidated by an unscrupulous Jew
- Gordon deals effectively with the Hebrew
- Flemington Racecourse 1808
- Prince Rupert Falls
- Gordon dazed – remounts
- The crash of the splintering wood
- Prince Rupert's second fall
- Gordon seriously injured
- Gordon recovers from his accident
- News of Gordon's prospective inheritance
- Gordon obtains an advance from a moneylender
- The editor's room of the Australasian
- Sea Spray and Smoke Drift rejected
- Gordon's cup of bitterness
- Gordon receives news of his disinheritance
- Gordon meets Kendall
- They adjourn to the Argus bar
- Kendall shows Gordon his criticism of Bush Ballads
- Gordon and Kendall spend their last shilling
- Gordon walks to Brighton
- Gordon loses all hope
- Gordon broods by the fireside
- And when the morning breaks
- He shoulders his gun
- His pathetic parting with Maggie
- Gun in his hand he walks along the beach
- A fisherman greets Gordon
- Gordon enters the tea tree scrub
- The passing of Gordon's soul
- The bushman reads his life story
- The 1916 "Gordon" pilgrimage to Brighton
- Amongst Gordon's old friends
- The shower of sun-kissed wattle

== Cast ==
- Hugh McCrae as Adam Lindsay Gordon
- Alfred Harford as maniac
- Jane Bridges as Gordon's first sweetheart
- Maggie Park as Gordon's wife

== Production ==
The film was made by a partnership that W. J. Lincoln entered into with G.H. Barnes following his stint with J. C. Williamson Ltd.

The star, Hugh McCrae, had a background as a theatre actor. He went on to become a noted essayist. According to The Bulletin the film was expected to take 14 days of filming. "As Mac. is related to the deceased on his mother's side, blood is expected to tell. The work, however, will be necessarily trying."

Pre-production started in June 1916. The shoot seems to have taken place from mid July to mid August, on location and in the JC Williamson's Studios.

Filming was difficult with the production often short of funds – one on occasion an actor and cameraman seized the camera so they could get paid.

Barnes and Lincoln were sued by Amalgamated Pictures.

Lincoln fell ill with alcoholic poisoning and spent some time in hospital, forcing Barnes to take over direction.

== Reception ==
William Trainor, a close friend of Gordon's, saw the film and wrote a letter of congratulations to Lincoln and Barnes saying:

Dear Friends, I cannot permit another day to pass without offering my congratulations and an explanation of my feelings on seeing the life's phases of my dear friend and comrade, Adam Lindsay Gordon, depicted so faithfully and realistically on the screen. With the material at your disposal, I think you have accomplished wonders, and in years to come your picture will prove an historic production. So vivid were some of the scenes that even the forty years since his passing has not dimmed the memory of them, and tears welled in my eyes. I feel that your picture will help Australians to understand Gordon as I knew him, one of Nature's True and Noble Gentlemen. You have my earnest well wishes for success in your praiseworthy work, and in saying this I think I voice the sentiments of all those friends who knew him well.

One writer said that "fairly judged, it [the film] is a not unsuccessful effort to produce in Australia a pictorial presentation of a purely Australian and deeply interesting subject." The Register called it "a realistic representation of the romantic life of their most popular poet, and the authors are deserving of tho highest commendation for their success." The critic from the Advertiser said that:

The writers... have been careful in their adherence to its varying episodes, never straining after a dramatic eltect to the detriment of true story. The film has achieved surprising results since its first introduction to Australian audiences, and the possibilities of its success in England may be gauged from the fact that a leading London film company offered over four figures for the English rights of the production... Throughout the story a charming love romance moves, and gives to the picture that pathetic realism with which life would be divested of its chief fascination. All the characters were chosen from types. Particularly is this so in the case of the hero, whom critics claim to be "Gordon to the life".

The film had a popular run in Adelaide but was not a big success at the box office. Lincoln died shortly afterward.

In 1925 Barnes was reported as saying "the venture was not conspicuously successful, being planned on artistic lines, and too ambitious. He admits too that technically the film was not comparable in a favorable light with a picture made under perfect conditions, but regards the episode as vastly useful experience."
