= Files from Scotland Yard =

- Directed by: Anthony Squire
- Produced by: Henry Hobhouse
- Starring: John Harvey; Moira Lister; Louise Hampton
- Music by: Temple Abady
- Production company: Parthian Productions
- Distributed by: Independent Film Distributors
- Release date: February 1951
- Running time: 57 minutes
- Country: United Kingdom
- Language: English

Files from Scotland Yard is a 1951 British second feature ('B') crime film directed by Anthony Squire and starring John Harvey, Moira Lister and Louise Hampton. It was produced by Parthian, which was wound up soon afterwards.

== Synopsis ==
The film comprises three unrelated stories: "Interrogation, "Lady's Companion", and "The Telephone".

== Cast ==
- John Harvey as Jim Hardy
- Moira Lister as Joanna Goring
- Louise Hampton as Agatha Steele
- Reginald Purdell as Inspector Gower
- Dora Bryan as Minnie Robinson
- Ben Williams

== Reception ==
The Daily Film Renter wrote: "Documentary-type drama, portraying three rather trivial incidents from the files of Scotland Yard, reviews each incident under a different title, each having no relation to the others. From the three episodes, one stands out as being entertaining, one could be termed so-so, and the third, dull and uninteresting. Entertaining is "Interrogation", showing how Chief Inspector Gower (Reginald Purdell), forces the truth by interrogation to reveal the culprit in a murder case. 'So-so' is "Lady's Companion", in which a humble spinster (Louise Hampton), finding that her mistress has committed suicide, makes it appear that a City confidence-trickster murdered her employer. Dull and uninteresting is the middle episode, "The Telephone," in which Moira Lister gives up her lover to be with her future husband in South Africa. This portion is well named "The Telephone" for the whole action takes place in the bedroom of her flat, where the telephone does not remain on its hook for many seconds."
