= The Man in the Trunk =

1942 film by Malcolm St. Clair

- Theatrical release poster
- Directed by: Malcolm St. Clair
- Screenplay by: John Larkin
- Produced by: Walter Morosco
- Starring: Lynne Roberts; George Holmes; Raymond Walburn; J. Carrol Naish; Dorothy Peterson; Eily Malyon
- Cinematography: Glen MacWilliams
- Edited by: Alex Troffey
- Music by: Cyril J. Mockridge
- Production company: 20th Century Fox
- Distributed by: 20th Century Fox
- Release date: September 18, 1942
- Running time: 71 minutes
- Country: United States
- Language: English

The Man in the Trunk is a 1942 American comedy film directed by Malcolm St. Clair and written by John Larkin. The film stars Lynne Roberts, George Holmes, Raymond Walburn, J. Carrol Naish, Dorothy Peterson and Eily Malyon. The film was released on September 18, 1942, by 20th Century Fox.

== Plot ==
The victim of a murder, Jim Cheevers (Raymond Walburn), is disposed of in a luggage trunk. Ten years later, when the trunk is opened, all that remains in the way of evidence is his skeleton. When a young attorney (George Holmes) attempts to solve the murder, he is visited by the ghost of the deceased, who helps him find the man who murdered him.

== Cast ==
- Lynne Roberts as Peggy LaRue
- George Holmes as Dick Burke
- Raymond Walburn as Jim Cheevers
- J. Carrol Naish as Reginald DeWinters
- Dorothy Peterson as Lola DeWinters
- Eily Malyon as Abbie Addison
- Arthur Loft as Sam Kohler
- Milton Parsons as Doctor Pluma
- Matt McHugh as Detective Murtha
- Charles Cane as Police Lieut. Braley
- Theodore von Eltz as Theodore Swann
- Joan Marsh as Yvonne Duvalle
- Syd Saylor as Joe
- Douglas Fowley as Ed Mygatt
- Tim Ryan as Auctioneer
- Vivien Oakland as Mrs. Tessie Sweeney Kohler
