= The Bondage of the Bush =

- Directed by: Charles Woods
- Written by: Charles Woods
- Produced by: Charles Woods
- Starring: Charles Woods
- Cinematography: Bert Ive
- Production company: Woods' Australian Films
- Release date: 18 August 1913
- Running time: 4,000 feet
- Country: Australia
- Languages: Silent film English intertitles

The Bondage of the Bush is a 1913 Australian silent film starring, written, produced and directed by Charles Woods. It is considered a lost film. It screened widely in country areas.

== Plot ==
The film was divided into the following chapters:

- the great race
- a leap for life
- horse and man precipitated to raging torrents below
- fight with the waters
- the dash for liberty
- the struggle on the cliffs
- the black boy's revenge

== Cast ==
- D.R. Rivenall as Dan Romer
- Charles Woods as Gee-Bung
- Wilton Power as Wilfred Granger
- Jeff Williams as James Bramley
- Alfred Bristow as Parson Bramley
- Gertrude Darley as Monda Bramley
- E.W. Newman
- H. Ward
- H.N. Gannan
- E.L. Betts
- J. Darley
- G. Filmer as Sergeant Jones
- J. Hamilton as Trooper Wallace
