= Jørgen Peter Müller =

Danish gymnastics educator (1866–1938)

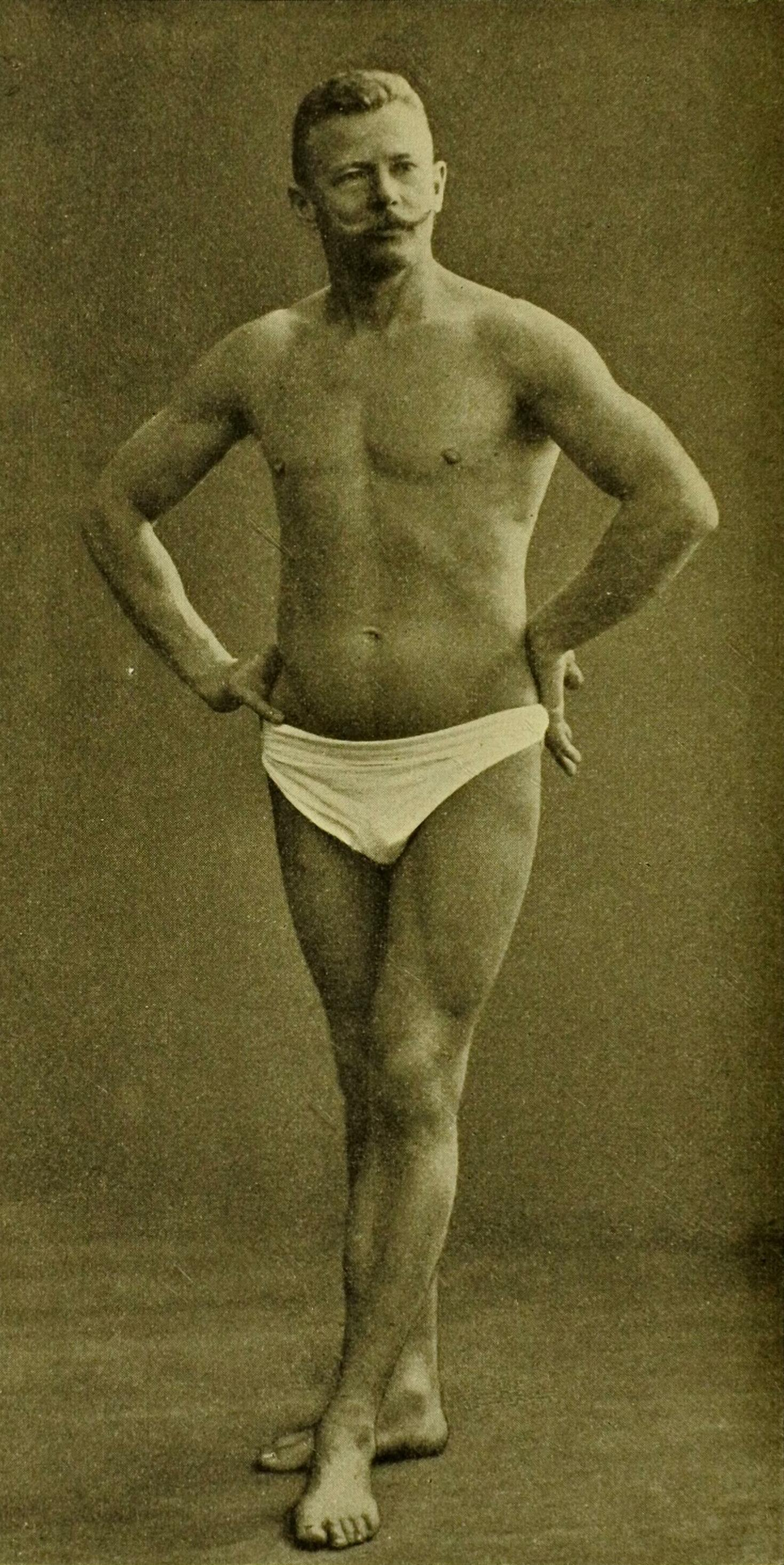
- Born: 7 October 1866; Nykøbing Falster
- Died: 17 November 1938 (aged 72); Copenhagen
- Other names: J. P. Muller
- Occupations: Author, athlete

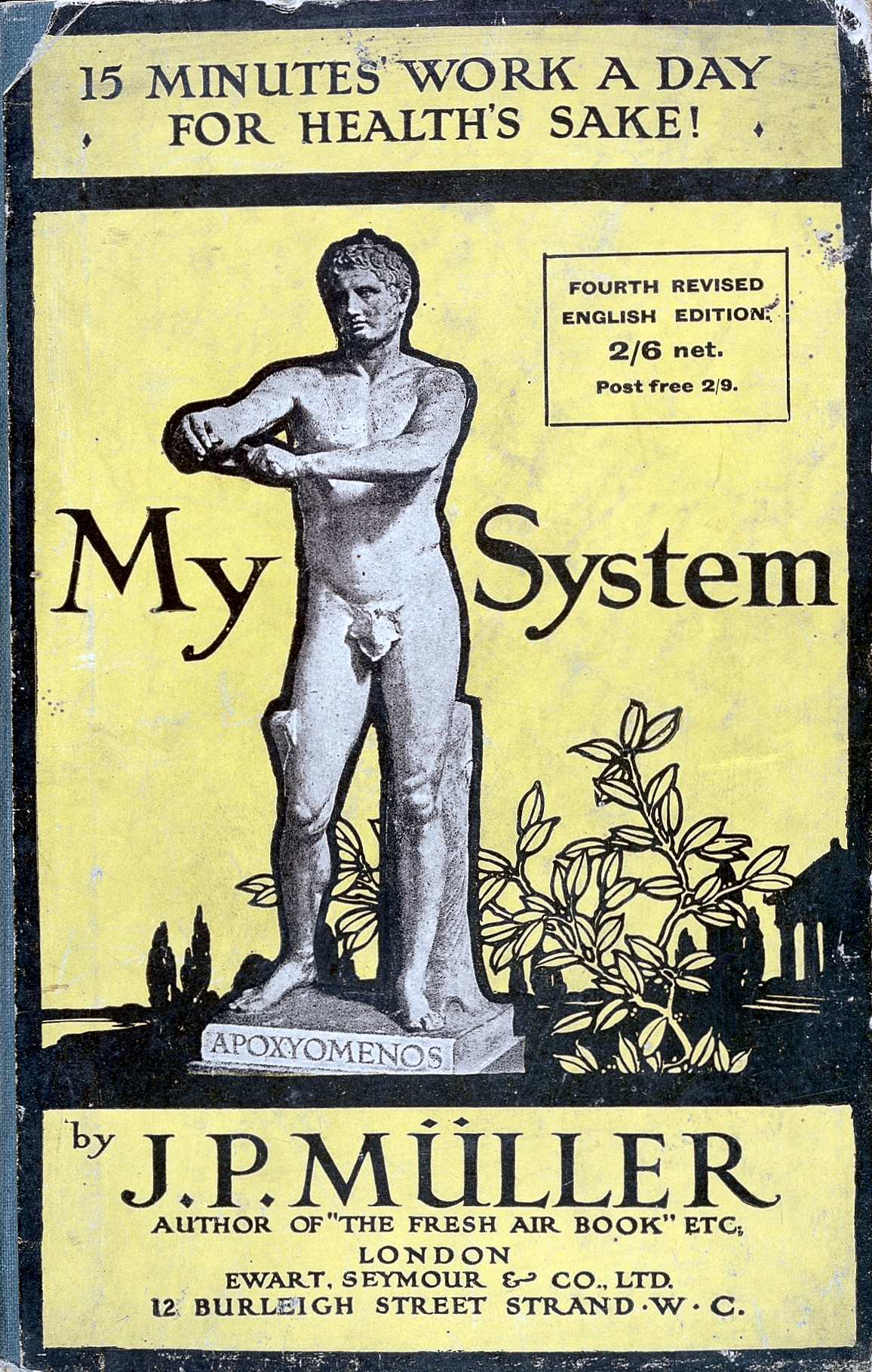
Cover of "My System, 15 minutes work a day for health's sake"

Jørgen Peter Müller (7 October 1866 – 17 November 1938) was a Danish gymnastics educator and author. He is also known as J. P. Muller.

== Biography ==
His book Mit System (My System), published in 1904, was a bestseller and has been translated to English and many other languages. My System explains Müller's philosophy of health and provides guidelines for the 18 exercises that comprise the system, as well as photographic instructions featuring Müller himself. The book was the most successful physical culture book published in Britain during the early twentieth century. Müller moved to London and opened a physical culture institute in 1912.

Much of what was stated in his system has since been accepted by the medical community, with many of his basic movements being used in modern-day physical therapy and rehabilitation. The emphasis on body-weight exercise and the use of dynamic stretching is useful for many people, and has been found appropriate in a wide range of patients. As well as exercises, stretching and breathing routines, Müller also advocated a towel-rubbing routine to follow a daily bath, the benefits of fresh air, and warned against the dangers of wearing too many clothes.

In some cases he re-wrote his books himself in English, rather than have them translated directly from the Danish.

Müller was appointed Knight of the Dannebrog in 1919.

Müller had three sons named Ib, Per and Bror who featured in pictures in his books.

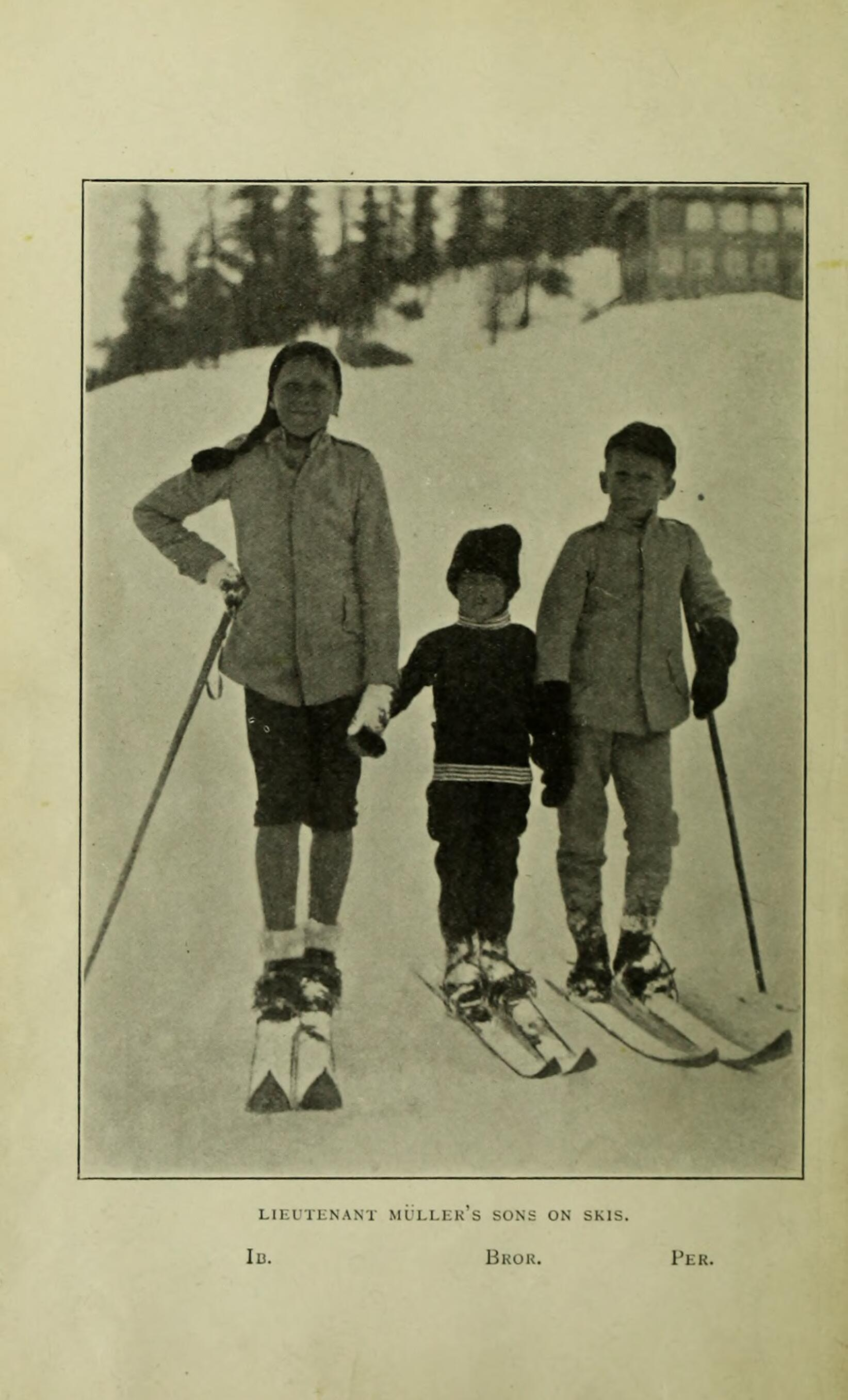
J.P. Müller's children, Ib, Bror and Per

== Selected publications ==
- My System, 1904
- Vink om sundhedsrøgt og idræt, 1907
- The Fresh Air book, 1908
- My System for Children, 1913
- My System for Ladies, 1913
- My Breathing System, 1914
- The Daily Five Minutes, 1924
