= Bert Ive =

English-born Australian cinematographer and photographer

- Born: 1875; Reading, Berkshire, England
- Died: 1939 (aged 63–64)
- Occupation: Cinematographer
- Years active: 1896–1939

Bert Ive (1875–1939) was a British-born Australian cinematographer, who was the first long-term cinematographer and still photographer in Australia. During his career as a film photographer for the federal government from 1913 to 1939, he frequently travelled across Australia to photograph the country's landscapes, industries, people and famous events. His motion pictures and still photos were used to promote Australia to the rest of the world.

== Early life ==
Ive was born in Reading, Berkshire, England in 1875 and became interested in cameras and photography in childhood. When he was 11, his family moved to Brisbane, where he began his career in cinematography. After dropping out of school at the age of 13, Bert Ive worked in several jobs, among them: glass embosser, logo writer, decorator and painter. He took an artistic view of life and work due to his training as an artist.

== Career ==
In 1896, Ive began working on stage productions. When he watched the film for the first time, Ive became fascinated by it. Because of this, he converted a cinematographer traveling in northern New South Wales and southern Queensland, and in Brisbane he projected film and song transparencies for Ted Holland's Vaudeville Entertainers in 1906. His first actuality film was shot in 1909. In May 1913, he was nominated as a cinematographer and still photographer for the Commonwealth Government. This position had been held by James Pinkerton Campbell from December 1911 to May 1913, whose appointment was not successful due to personal conflicts, quality disputes and insufficient funding of his work. In contrast, from the moment Ive started working as this role, he was encouraged to establish the Cinema and Photographic Branch for developing the film industry.

In the first month of his work, Ive was involved in setting up a workspace in Melbourne and purchasing equipment. The Brisbane's newspaper Star stated that it took him six months traveling around the states to take any photos of interest in 1914. Other newspapers reported that Bert was "an enthusiast", "a man of infinite resource" and "of a happy nature". However, the qualities that he expressed, as well as the propaganda of his works, usually ensure that he was welcomed wherever he went. Eight federal departments continuously managed Ive's activities from 1913 to 1939. Among them were Home and Territories, the departments of Markets and Commerce, External Affairs, and the Commonwealth Immigration Office. The changing oversight of his work reflected the varying capacities in which Ive completed government work, covering a wide array of subjects, such as promoting tourism, Australian goods, national awareness and national development to encouraging immigrants, particularly people from the UK.

During Ive's career as a government-affiliated cinematographer, he filmed key events for the younger generation, such as Gallipoli's first AIF team, the Royal Tour of 1920 and 1927, and the Australian east and west, Canberra Construction Railway and Sydney Harbour Bridge. Ive used several means of transportation in his travels throughout Australia. At the time, many Australians had not yet had a chance to explore their own country. By filming such documentaries, Ive promoted Australia to its citizens and attracted overseas tourists. The Cinema and Photographic Branch, grew from a one-man staff, Ive, to a Melbourne organisation with its own studio, laboratories, stock wares and producers, editors and photographers within 25 years of establishment. In 1930, the cinema completed a movie each week, and many of Ive's films were released in a series "Australia day after day" and "know your own country". In 1929, Lynn Maplestone and Ive emerged in Telling the World, which is a documentary about recording the Cinema Branch, and in 1930 produced the first sound film This is Australia. Ive's 1930s films were released domestically and overseas.

== Filmography as cinematographer ==
Year	Film	Notes
1927	In and Around Ballarat	Documentary shorts
1928	The Conquest of the Pacific	Documentary shorts
1936	Among the Hardwoods	Documentary shorts
1911	Driving a Girl to Destruction	Short drama
1913	The Bondage of the Bush	Short drama
1916	The Life's Romance of Adam Lindsay Gordon	Silent film
1918; 1919	German Concentration Camps: Holsworthy, Trial Bay, Berrimah, Molonglo	Silent film

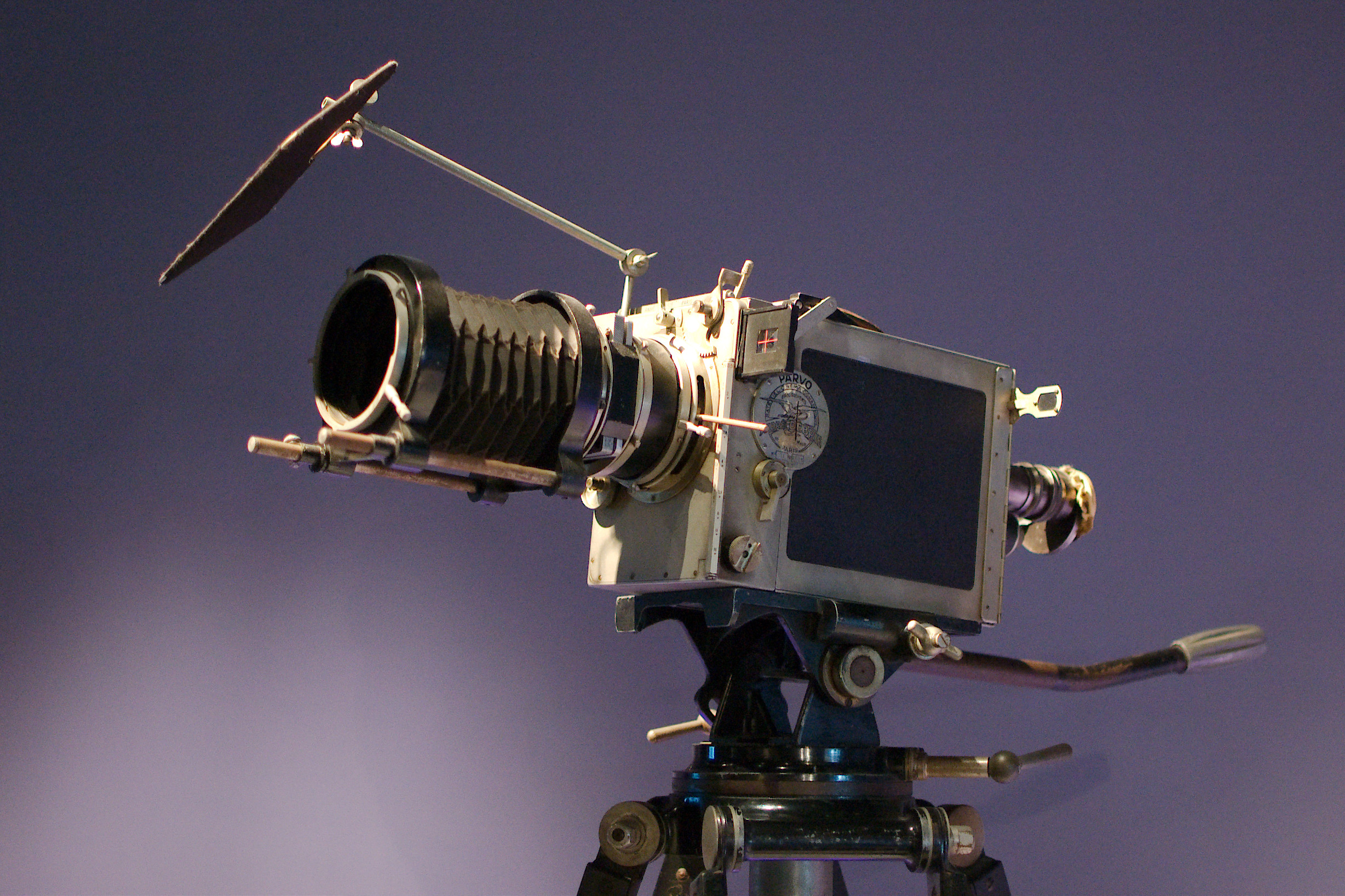
Ive used a 35mm Debrie Parvo movie camera, Model L, made in 1927

In the silent film era, Bert Ive made a documentary about Ballarat in June 1927. In and Around Ballarat begins from the Blackball Observation Deck and looks westward MacArthur Street to Lake Wendouree showing today's unidentifiable electric trams and the mining dumps that served commuters from 1905 to 1971. The film shows the industrial and agricultural after the First World War in a modern inland city, but people still remember the glory days of the gold rush with men holding plaster casts of some lumps of gold discovered during the ore boom, containing 69 kilograms of "Welcome Nugget" found on June 9, 1858, at Bakery Mountain, this is the largest gold nugget had ever seen in the world. At the end of the film, the representative of the Eureka Rebellion was founded in 1893 by the rebel leader Peter Larol, who had the Eureka Stockade plaque on the base. Larol survived the rebellion and became a member of parliament at last.

The Conquest of the Pacific is a black and white silent documentary in 1928 that celebrated the first flight across the Pacific Ocean. The plane named "Southern Cross" arrived in Brisbane on June 9, 1928, and Charles Kingsford Smith and his crew members became the first to fly across the Pacific. Smith bought a second-hand Fokker F.VIIb without engines in America from Sir Hubert Wilkins, who was an Arctic explorer. Then he installed new engines to cross the Pacific along with his co-pilot Charles Ulm, navigator Harry Lyon and radio operator Jim Warner. On May 31, 1928, they departed from Oakland, California, and flew to Eagle Farm Airport in Brisbane via Suva and Hawaii. The distance was 11,585 kilometers and the flight time was 83 hours and 50 minutes. They were caught in austere storms on the way, those increasing the risk of flying and navigation over ocean. The crew had to write down course directions and information in these situations. Besides, Smith and the "Southern Cross" completed some important flights after crossing the Pacific. They flew over the Australian Continent ceaselessly and first crossed Tasman after crossing the Atlantic east-west. In order to commemorate the historic flight, Bert made the film to record it. The silent film covered four captions, these were used to clarify what was going to happen next on screen. It started from a subtitle "Excited crowds await the ‘Southern Cross’ at Brisbane", then introduced the scene of the "Southern Cross" stopping on taxiway. The second subtitle, "Captain Kingsford Smith is the first to land", was followed by a shot of Kingsford Smith waving to the crowd then another member and he were hoisted by the crowd. The next two subtitles were "Followed by his fellow countryman, C. T. P. Ulm, and Americans Lyon and Warner" and "The crowd takes possession", which introduced the scene in which Kingsford Smith and other crew members were taken by the crowd to a car which specially waiting for them. The film depicts the moment of Kingsford Smith's first major international aviation victory. Some details shown in the film, such as Smith's appearance from the cockpit with cigarette, and it displayed tobacco which was accepted universally at that time. Importantly, it records the views of "South Cross", a wingspan is 23 meters, the length is 15 meters, 3.9 meters high, with a Fokker F.VIIb-3m. The "Southern Cross" is on exhibition at International Airport of Brisbane today.

The lyrical documentary Among the Hardwoods was filmed in southwestern Western Australia. The film presented an impressive depiction of the lumbering in the state. It recorded all the sounds of the bush faithfully including the bullock teams, a sawmill and the axemen, except spoken commentary. In 1926, Ive and Lacey Percival re-shot a silent documentary for the federal government's Know Your Own Country series, they improved the sound version on the original in different methods.

Driving a Girl to Destruction is filmed by cinematographer Bert Ive, the director is George Marlow. The film was produced by the Australian Picturized Drama Company, founded by theatre enterpriser George Marlow at the Adelphi Theatre in Sydney. Marlow's dramatic production has been successful and extensively toured, and in the next few years, the film did occasionally appear in country areas.

The Bondage of Bush is an Australian silent film starring, produced, directed and written by Charles Woods. It is filmed by Bert Ive in 1913. The film was divided into seven chapters: the great race, a leap for life, horse and man precipitated to raging torrents below, fight with the waters, the dash for liberty, the struggle on the cliffs and the black boy's revenge.

The Life of Adam Lindsay Gordon is an Australian feature-length film shot by Ive and directed by W. J. Lincoln, on the basis of Adam Lindsay Gordon’s life, who was a poet. The story begins with Gordon studying at Cheltenham College. Then he described his career as a soldier in the Australian jungle when he was assigned to escort a madman to a refuge 200 miles away. Due to he refused to clean up the sergeant's boots, he later resigned the job to become a horse rider and obstacle racer. Later, Gordon was in debt and decided to commit suicide. With only 37 minutes left in the film, this surviving episode reveals a subtle movie, and finally scene was Gordon sits at his hearth at the end of his life. Bert showed an advance in lighting and film photography of the film in 1916.

German concentration camps: Holsworthy, Trial Bay, Berrimah, Molonglo was black and white, silent actuality footage. In the summer of 1918-1919, the film scenes of Molonglo and Holsworthy internment camps were taken by Ive, and also included earlier footage from Berrima and Trial Bay. The effect of the film was to express the distinction between the conditions of returning to British prisoners of war in Germany and the conditions enjoyed by German detainees in Australian refugee camps.

== Filmography as editor ==
Year	Film	Notes
1912	Angel of his Dreams	Drama

Angel of his Dream is an Australian film shot by Bert Ive and directed by George Marlow, concerning a clergyman who was seduced by a woman. It was Marlow's follow up to Driving a Girl to Destruction.

== Death and legacy ==
Ive died on July 25, 1939. Until his death, he remained heavily involved with the Cinema Branch's photography work. Following his death, after the United Kingdom and Australia declared their war against Germany, the Cinema Branch became part of federal government's newly established information department, which established the Film Division in 1940 to mobilise film for national purposes. The Townsville Daily Bulletin reported that his body of work in Australia has been a monument to his "energy and vision" for more than a quarter of a century. This tradition was passed on to the cinema's post-war successors, the Film Department, the Commonwealth Film Department and the Australian Film Department, which are now part of the NFSA film Australia collection. Ive's film encouraged the sale of Australian goods and tourism and attracted immigrants into Australia in the 1920s.
