= Christian Bjelke-Petersen =

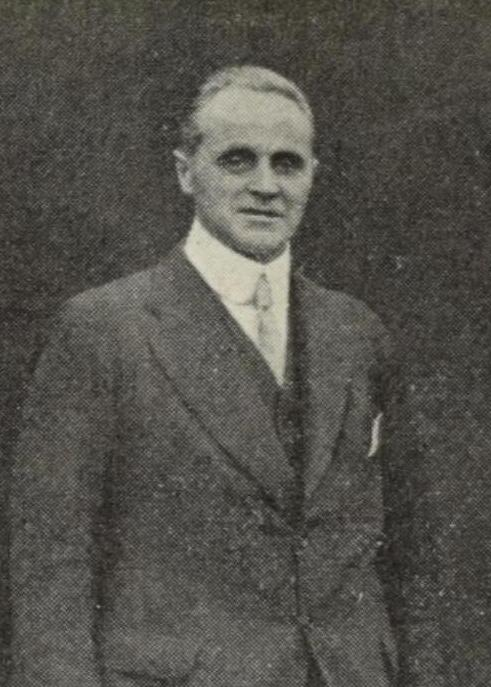
- Bjelke-Petersen in 1920
- Born: 14 April 1872; Copenhagen, Denmark
- Died: 23 May 1964 (aged 92); Eaglehawk Neck, Tasmania, Australia
- Known for: Proponent of physical culture
- Spouse: Dorothy Henri (m. 1933)
- Relatives: Marie Bjelke Petersen (sister); Joh Bjelke-Petersen (nephew)

Hans Christian Bjelke-Petersen (14 April 1872 – 23 May 1964) was a Danish-Australian proponent of physical culture. He established one of Australia's first chains of physical fitness institutes.

== Early life ==
Bjelke-Petersen was born in Copenhagen on 14 April 1872. He was the son of Caroline Vilhelmine (née Hansen) and Georg Peter Bjelke-Petersen; his father was a gardener and builder.

Bjelke-Petersen was initially home-schooled and later attended schools in Copenhagen and in Dresden, Germany. He trained as a schoolteacher, graduating from a training college in Copenhagen in 1890. After a period in London, he and his family immigrated to Australia in 1891, arriving in Tasmania aboard SS Doric. He subsequently worked as a schoolteacher, teaching gymnastics, foot drill, geography and science at The Friends' School, Hobart, and gymnastics and German at The Hutchins School. He was naturalised as a British subject in 1894.

== Physical culture ==
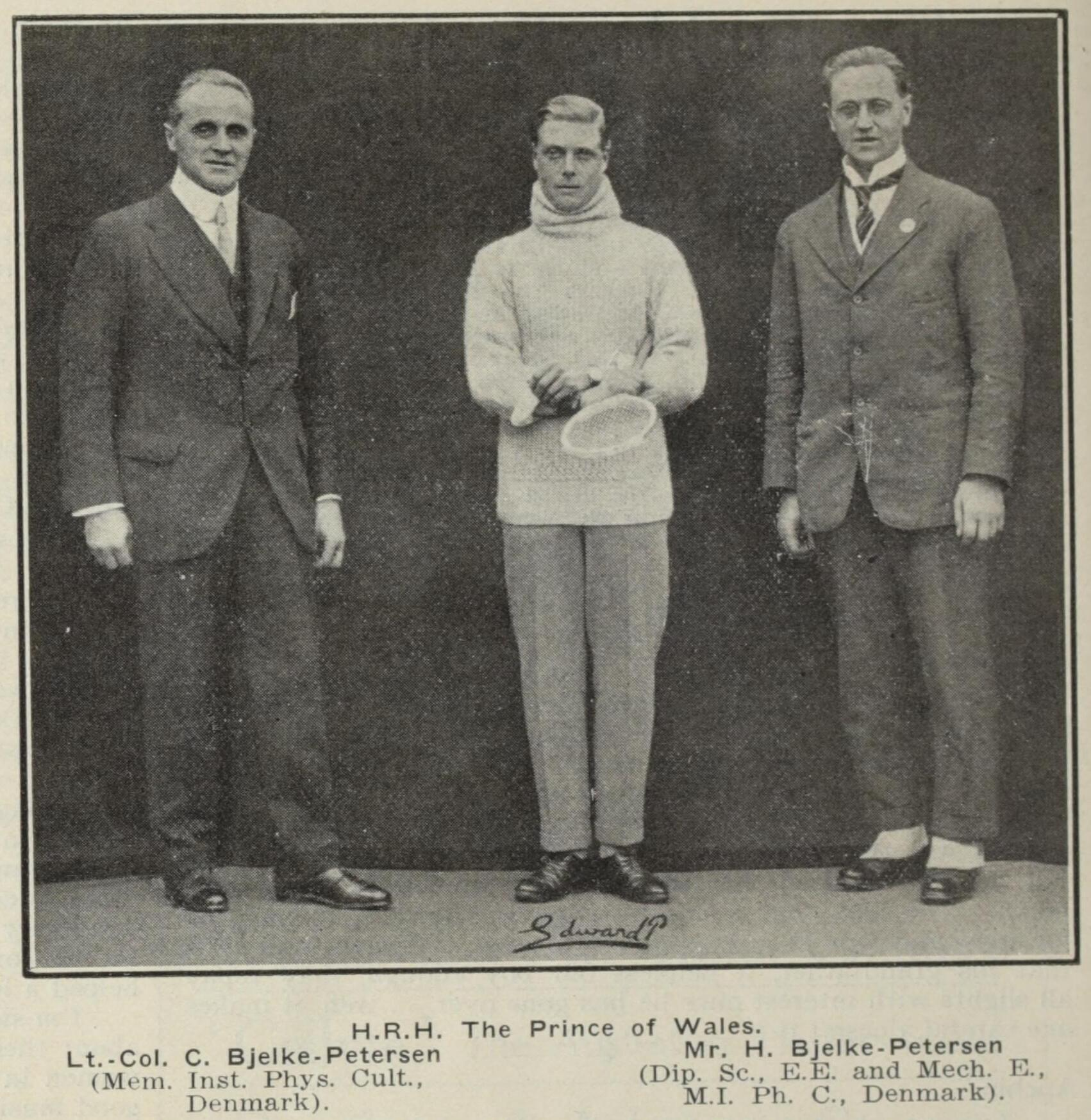
Bjelke-Petersen (left) and his brother Harald with their client Edward, Prince of Wales, in 1920

In 1892, Bjelke-Petersen opened a physical education institute in Hobart. He was subsequently engaged by the state Education Department to train teachers in a physical culture scheme intended to replace the existing system of military-style drills in Tasmanian state schools. His scheme "stressed the importance of breathing exercises, deportment drills, physical culture games, and rest between exercises". Bjelke-Petersen was also interested in anthropometry. In 1902 he conducted one of the first anthropometric surveys of Australian schoolchildren, a series of measurements of the physical attributes and racial origins of boys in Hobart. He concluded that "the bright pupil has fewest physical irregularities of growth, the dull pupils score slightly higher, while the criminal boys are leading by a long way [...] these lines indicate that the normal boy is likely to be the best boy morally".

Bjelke-Petersen moved to Sydney in 1906 and with his brother Harald established a physical training institute, the Bjelke-Petersen School of Physical Culture. Their sister Marie ran the women's section in Hobart and helped popularise physical culture among women and girls, who would eventually become the main clientele. Another institute was opened in Melbourne in 1909 and their business grew substantially after World War I. Edward, Prince of Wales, used their facilities while on a visit to Australia in 1920, after which they claimed royal patronage in advertisements.

In 1923, Bjelke-Petersen and his brother sold their Melbourne business to Percy Pearce, where it became known as the Pearce Bjelke-Petersen Institute. They subsequently concentrated on their Sydney gymnasium on Elizabeth Street, and in the same year he claimed to have given instruction to more than 5,000 students in Sydney across nearly 100 schools. Their premises expanded to include "squash and basketball courts, [...] departments for remedial exercises, orthopaedic massage and electrical treatment". From the 1920s onwards, Bjelke-Petersen's institutes increasingly focused on women, with his physical culture system evolved into a form of dance-based aerobics nicknamed "physie". He was an advocate for women's fitness and opposed the use of restrictive garments like corsets. He retired from active participation in 1927 but remained a director of the institutes.

== Military service ==
In 1911, Bjelke-Petersen was appointed by the Fisher government as director of a physical training scheme within the Department of Defence, despite objections that he was not a native-born citizen. He was given the honorary rank of lieutenant-colonel and continued the scheme until the outbreak of World War I in 1914, organising the training of instructors for cadets and schoolchildren within the Universal Training Scheme. Bjelke-Petersen resumed his involvement with the military in 1918 as an inspector of physical training. He was later an honorary consultant from 1920 to 1922.

== Personal life ==
In 1933, Bjelke-Petersen married Dorothy Gertrude Leonie Henri, a theological college student who claimed descent from French nobility. The couple had a 30-year age difference, and had no children. His nephew Joh Bjelke-Petersen became premier of Queensland.

Bjelke-Petersen retired back to Tasmania where he was involved with the Pocket Testament League and Christian youth organisations. He was also involved with the creation of the Teachers' Christian Fellowship in Tasmania, modelled on a Danish organisation.

Bjelke-Petersen died on 23 May 1964 in Eaglehawk Neck, Tasmania, aged 92. In the 1980s, his widow asserted that the couple had been engaged as Australian spies in Europe in the mid-1930s, making use of Bjelke-Petersen's German language skills and "observing political developments, speaking to people in authority, concluding that war was, indeed, coming and reporting to the Australian authorities".
