= Marie Bjelke Petersen =

Danish-Australian novelist (1874–1969)

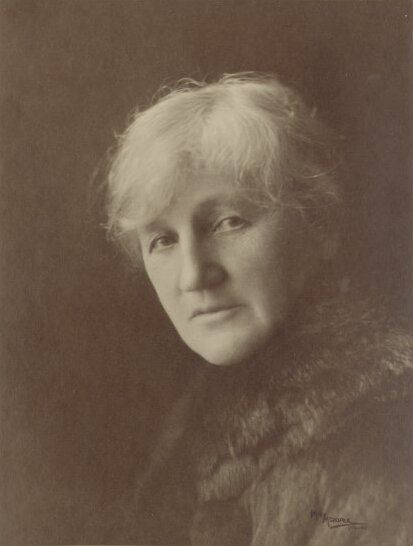
- Marie Bjelke Petersen, 1927
- Born: 23 December 1874; Copenhagen, Denmark
- Died: 11 October 1969 (aged 94); Lindisfarne, Tasmania, Australia
- Known for: Novelist
- Relatives: Christian Bjelke-Petersen (brother); Joh Bjelke-Petersen (nephew)

Marie Caroline Bjelke Petersen (23 December 1874 – 11 October 1969) was a Danish-Australian novelist and physical culture teacher. She wrote nine popular romance novels between 1917 and 1937. Her novels were set in Australia, mostly in rural Tasmania, and represent an alternative vision of Australia to that of earlier writers.

Marie Bjelke Petersen's biographer, Alison Alexander, wrote: "With her Danish background Marie was not steeped in the laconic lore of the bush propagated by the Bulletin and its school of admirers, and she set out to glorify her adopted land, to depict Australia as a cultured civilised place, with charming people (setting aside the villains), a quite different portrayal from that usually found in the literature of her day."

It has been claimed that her works were more popular in the United States and England than Australia.

Her brothers founded physical culture institutes which continued to function through the end of the 20th century, and her nephew, Joh Bjelke-Petersen, became the Premier of Queensland.

== Life ==
Marie Bjelke Petersen was the only daughter and second child of Georg Peter Bjelke-Petersen, a gardener and then master builder, and his wife Caroline Vilhelmine, née Hansen. (Originally plain "Petersen" Georg hyphenated his name for unknown reasons sometime in the 1860s.) Marie went to school in Denmark, Germany and England but lived most of her life in Tasmania after emigrating with her parents and four brothers in 1891. She was naturalised in 1915.

Marie Bjelke Petersen was trained as a painter in Denmark. She continued to paint for many years in Australia, mostly oil landscapes. She often wintered in Brisbane, Sydney or Melbourne where she would take a flat and hold religious meetings. She attracted a large following of young women as was common with female romantic novelists of her time.

While she enjoyed mythology and would write notes to fairies in her garden, she was a committed Christian who "never overlooked the poor and needy". A conservative herself, she numbered among her friends Marie Pitt the poet and socialist activist who lived openly and indeed notoriously with her married lover. Gardening and reading were interests that Marie Bjelke Petersen continued into her nineties.

By the late 20th century, Bjelke Petersen had become a gay and lesbian icon. She lived in an intimate relationship with contralto Sylvia Mills, whom she met in 1898, for thirty years. It has been argued that her book The Captive Singer is about Mills. She was not necessarily a lesbian however, or at least not seen as such in her own time; close sentimental women's friendships were still not assumed to be sexual in 1920s Australia.

== Career in physical culture ==
In 1892, her brother Lt Col Hans Christian Bjelke-Petersen founded the Bjelke-Petersen Physical Culture School. (He is credited with building Australia's first squash court, shortly after World War I.) Marie was in charge of the women's section and taught there and at other schools before turning to writing in 1910 when injury meant she could no longer teach.

In the mid-1890s, the Bjelke-Petersens learnt of the new game, basketball, that was becoming popular in the United States. Marie is credited with introducing drills designed specifically for players of the game into the physical culture program she taught in schools. "It can be argued, therefore, that Marie Bjelke Petersen was instrumental in introducing the sport of netball to Tasmania." She was also a registered massage therapist.

== Writing career ==
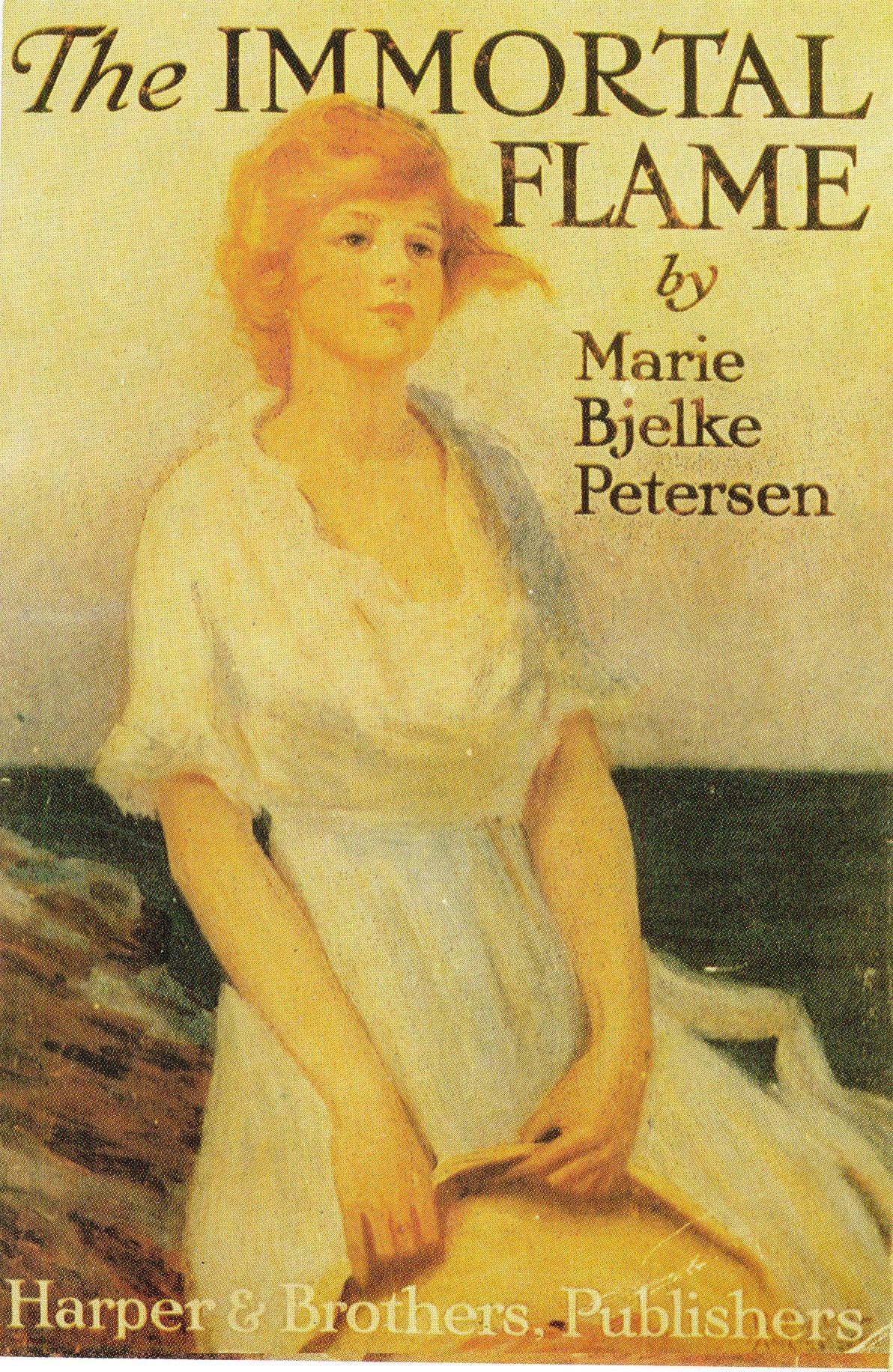
New York edition of "The Immortal Flame" 1919

She had short sketches and stories published in various newspapers and magazines before achieving success with her first novel. Three religious tracts were published as The Mysterious Stranger (1913), Before an Eastern Court (1914) and Muffled Drums (1914). The success of the first of these tracts helped her to find a publisher for her first novel, The Captive Singer (1917). It was based on a guide who sang at Tasmania's Marakoopa Cave and was a financial success selling 150,000 copies in English and a further 40,000 in Danish translation. This first novel established Marie Bjelke Petersen as a significant Australian writer.

Bjelke Petersen approached Australian-born Hollywood actress Louise Lovely with her story Jewelled Nights suggesting it might suit Lovely. Louise Lovely liked the story and produced a film of the same name with her then husband, Wilton Welch, in 1925. However, it was not a commercial success, recovering £5,000 of its £10,000 production cost. The film had its critics, some regarded its primary weakness as its plot which involved a girl disguising herself as a boy. However the film was a popular success in Australia and overall the critics were friendly – another explanation was that this ambitious film fell victim to structural distribution problems facing the Australian film industry.

Her novels were distinguished by a fresh literary take on Australian life, closely observed scenery and social background and, by the standards of the romance genre, comparatively non-stereotyped characterisation and plot. Despite her conservative politics they were also notable for their celebration of Australian egalitarianism and her promotion of women's rights at a time when (and a place where) the women's movement was largely quiescent. Her novels also reflected her devout Christianity. A striking feature of her novels was their intense feeling for landscape, almost to the extent of ascribing sentience to natural features.

Her novels sold altogether around 250,000 copies in English, a phenomenal success for an Australian writer at that time. They were also translated into six languages, including Arabic.

== Awards ==
In 1935, she won the King's Jubilee medal for services to literature.

== Bibliography ==
- The Mysterious Stranger (1913)
- Before an Eastern Court (1914)
- Muffled Drums (1914)
- The Captive Singer (1917)
- The Immortal Flame (1919)
- Dusk: A Novel (1921)
- Jewelled Nights (1923)
- The Moon Minstrel (1927)
- Monsoon Music (1930)
- The Rainbow Lute (1932)
- The Silver Knight (1934)
- Jungle Night (1937)
