= Physical culture =

Health and strength training movement

Physical culture, also known as body culture, is a health and strength training movement that originated during the 19th century in Germany, the UK and the US.

== Origins ==
The physical culture movement in the United States during the 19th century owed its origins to several cultural trends.

In the United States, German immigrants after 1848 introduced a physical culture system based on gymnastics that became popular, especially in colleges. Many local Turner clubs introduced physical education (PE) in the form of 'German gymnastics' into American colleges and public schools. The perception of Turner as 'non-American' prevented the 'German system' from becoming the dominating form. They were especially important mainly in the cities with a large German-American population, but their influence slowly spread.

By the late 19th century reformers worried that sedentary white-collar workers were suffering from various "diseases of affluence" that were partially attributed to their increasingly sedentary lifestyles. In consequence, numerous exercise systems were developed, typically drawing from a range of traditional folk games, dances and sports, military training, and medical calisthenics.

Physical culture programs were promoted through the education system, particularly at military academies, as well as via public and private gymnasiums.

The industry began the production of various items of exercise-oriented sports equipment. During the early and mid-19th century, these printed works and items of apparatus generally addressed exercise as a form of remedial physical therapy.

Certain items of equipment and types of exercise were common to several different physical culture systems, including exercises with Indian clubs, medicine balls, wooden or iron wands, and dumbbells.

Combat sports such as fencing, boxing, savate and wrestling were also widely practiced in physical culture schools and were touted as forms of physical culture in their own right.

The Muscular Christianity movement of the late 19th century advocated a fusion of energetic Christian activism and rigorous physical culture training.

== "The Battle of the Systems" ==
As physical culture became increasingly popular and profitable, there arose intense national and then international competition amongst the founders and/or promoters of various systems. This rivalry became informally known as "the Battle of the Systems". Both public gyms and educational institutions tended to take an eclectic approach, whereas private physical culture clubs and organizations often promoted particular exercise systems initially based on ethnocentric and cultural links.

Early private establishments were based on ethnic and cultural affiliation, such as the Turners and Sokol movements. These ethnocentric systems in America were centered on integration, and later stood apart from their origin countries, having very little contact with them by the time World War I emerged. Later outfits were based on preference to what each system offered as a matter of practicality, with some systems retaining in their names historical references to their geographic origin.

The German Turnverein movement promoted a system of what became known as "heavy gymnastics", meaning strenuous exercises performed with the use of elaborate equipment, such as pommel horses, parallel bars, and climbing structures. The Turnverein philosophy combined physical training with intellectual pursuits and with a strong emphasis on German culture. Numerous events in modern competitive gymnastics originated in or were popularized by the Turnverein system.

The Czech Sokol movement for physical culture was largely inspired by Turnverein.

By contrast with the German and Czech systems, the "Swedish System" founded by Pehr Henrik Ling promoted "light gymnastics", employing little, if any apparatus and focusing on calisthenics, breathing and stretching exercises as well as massage.

At the turn of the 20th century, bodybuilder and showman Eugen Sandow's system, based upon weight lifting, enjoyed considerable international popularity, while Edmond Desbonnet and George Hebert popularized their systems within France and French-speaking countries. Bernarr Macfadden's system became especially popular within the United States, via the promotion carried out through his publishing empire, particularly its flagship magazine titled "Physical Culture."

Other notable advocates of physical culture include Jørgen Peter Müller and Mary Bagot Stack.

== Australia ==
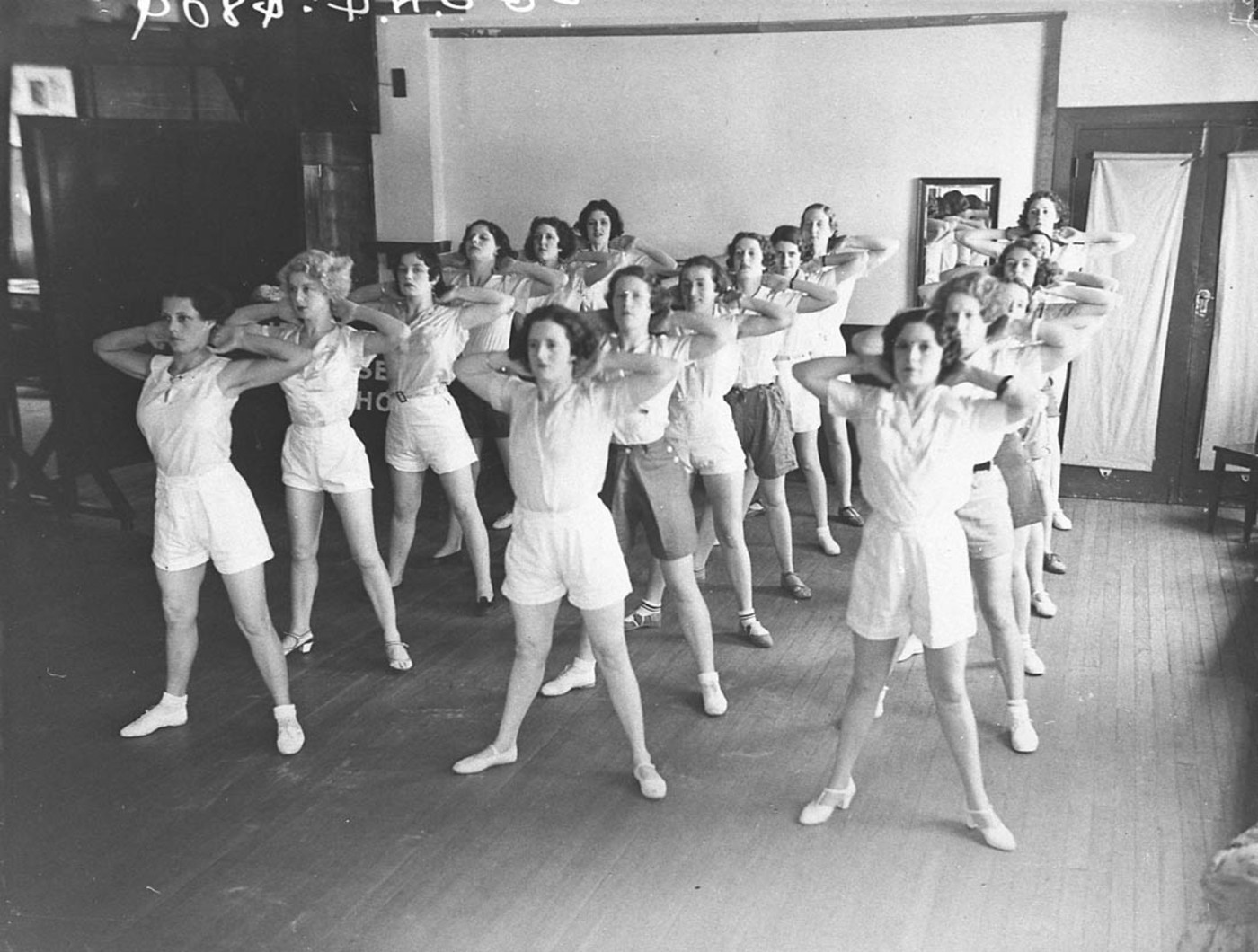
Women's class at the Bjelke-Petersen School of Physical Culture in Sydney, c. 1934

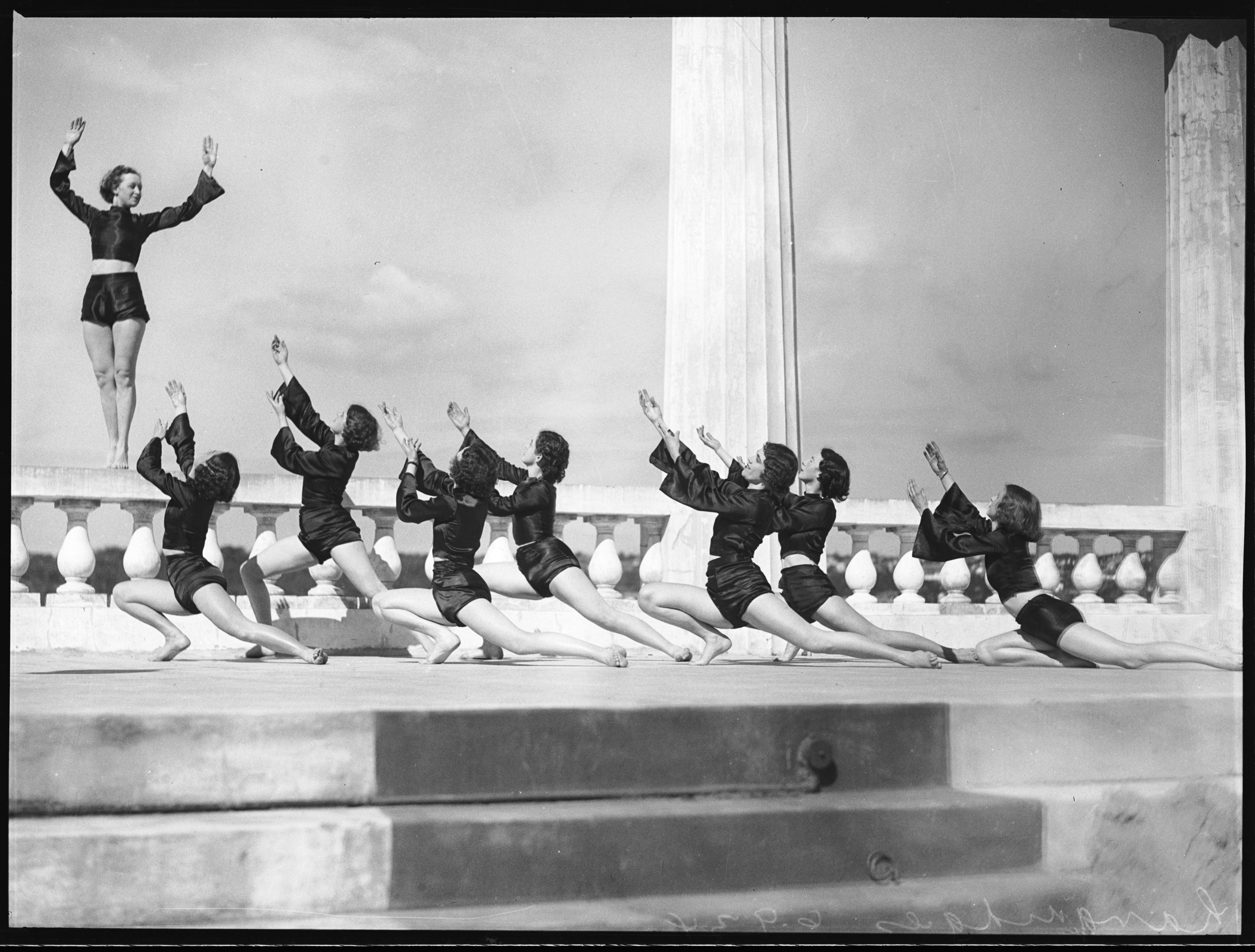
Langridge School of Physical Culture, Sydney, 6 September 1934

A physical culture practice, informally known as "physie" (pronounced "fizzy") developed in Australia in the 19th century and continues to this day, especially for women. It combines elements of march, rhythmic gymnastics, and dance, with a focus on good posture, and is aimed at young girls and women, from pre-school age to seniors.

The original physie school was the medical gymnasium Bjelke-Petersen Bros, founded in Hobart in 1892 by Danish immigrant Christian Bjelke-Petersen, whose sister Marie ran the women's section. It has been in continuous operation since that time, becoming the Bjelke-Petersen School of Physical Culture Ltd. in 2011. BJP is the largest association of physie within Australia.

In March 1934, a "physical culture demonstration" was performed at the Theatre Royal in Adelaide, by Weber, Shorthose & Rice.

Other leading historical schools include the Edith Parsons School of Physical Culture, founded in Sydney in 1961; and the Burns Association of Physical Culture, founded in Sydney in 1968, both still in operation. Other schools founded later include the Western Zone Physical Culture (1972), and The Australian Physie and Dance Association (APDA) (2011). United Physie was founded in 2023.

Competition structure varies between associations, but generally, there are local, state, and national competitions for teams and individuals. National championships are typically held at prestigious venues such as the Sydney Opera House or the Sydney International Convention Centre.

== Contemporary interest in 19th-century physical culture ==
Considerable academic research into 19th-century physical culture has been undertaken since the 1980s, and numerous articles, theses, and books have been produced addressing the topic from various perspectives.

Many contemporary strength and health training programs are based directly upon or draw inspiration from various physical culture systems.

The historic Hegeler Carus Mansion in LaSalle, Illinois, features a basement gymnasium, considered a rare surviving example of a late-19th-century Turnverein gymnastics club and physical culture training facility.

Modern collections of antique physical culture apparatus include those of the Joe and Betty Weider Museum of Physical Culture, part of the H.J. Lutcher Stark Center for Physical Culture and Sports at the University of Texas at Austin and the Gymuseum collection at the Forteza Fitness and Martial Arts studio in Ravenswood, Chicago.

== See also ==
- Fitness culture
- History of physical training and fitness
- Physical education
- Body culture studies
- Bodybuilding
- Weightlifting
- Powerlifting
- Strongman
- Arm wrestling
- Gymnastics
- Pilates
- Indian physical culture
  - Modern yoga, based on a combination of physical culture and hatha yoga
- Western sports
