= Frank Crossley (materials scientist) =

American engineer and materials scientist

- Born: February 19, 1925
- Died: April 14, 2018 (aged 93)
- Education: Illinois Institute of Technology (BS, MS, PhD)
- Scientific career
- Fields: Metallurgy; Aerospace
- Workplaces: Tennessee State University; Lockheed Missiles and Space Company; Aerojet
- Thesis: Grain Refinement by the Particle Reaction in Aluminum and the Aluminum Base Alloys

Frank Crossley (19 February 1925 — 15 April 2018) was an American engineer and pioneer in the field of titanium metallurgy. He was the first African-American to receive a PhD in metallurgical engineering.

== Education ==
Crossley received a B.S. in Chemical Engineering in 1945 with a minor in art from the Illinois Institute of Technology after being motivated by Lloyd A. Hall, an African American chemist who spoke to this high school science class. He went on to pursue a M.S. in 1947 and Ph.D. 1950 in Metallurgy all from the Illinois Institute of Technology. His PhD research was on development of titanium alloys. He was the first person to earn a Ph.D. in metallurgical engineering at Illinois Institute of Technology and the first person of African ancestry to earn a Ph.D. in metallurgy. He also graduated as an ensign in 1945 from the U.S. Naval Reserve Midshipmen's School. During World War II, Crossley was enrolled in the V-12 Navy College Training Program in 1944 that paid for his tuition and led to a commission as an officer.

== Research and career ==
He was U.S. Navy officer, 2nd Deck Division on the USS Storm King, AP 171. He was a professor and department head of foundry engineering at Tennessee State University from 1950 to 1952. He held research positions with Illinois Institute of Technology Research Institute from 1952 to 1966. He worked for Lockheed Missiles and Space Company from 1966 to 1986, where he studied titanium metallurgy, in the research laboratory. He was manager of the department producibility and standards, manager of the department of missile body mechanical engineering, and a consultant engineer in the missile systems division. He worked at Aerojet from 1986 – 1991 as director of research propulsion materials, research director of materials applications, and technical principal. He authored more than 60 papers and received seven patents. After retiring in 1991 he continued sharing his expertise in math and science by giving presentations on his career and tutoring young students. His legacy continued after his death in 2018 with a diversity award focused on overcoming adversity in his name given by the Minerals, Metals, & Materials Society (TMS).

== Awards and recognition ==
- American Society for Metals, International Fellow
- Who’s Who in America, editions 41–62 (1980–2008)
- Professional Service Award of the Northern California Council of Black Professional Engineers (1981)
- GenCorp Aerojet, R. B. Young Technical Innovation Award (1990)
- Illinois Institute of Technology Alumni Medal (2009)
- TMS Fellow (2019)
