= Majestic Theatre, Melbourne =

Cinema in Melbourne, Australia

Coordinates: 37°49′05″S 144°58′01″E

The Majestic Theatre was a cinema that opened on Flinders Street, Melbourne on 31 August 1912.

== History ==
The cinema was built for Amalgamated Pictures Ltd, whose directors included J. H. Tait and W. Gibson. Its architects were Klingender and Alsop, with assistance from Nahum Barnett. It was built in the style of a live theatre, with boxes near the proscenium, but with a slightly sloping ceiling, for improved acoustics, as well as a raked floor.

It was located in the four-storey Majestic Buildings, 178 Flinders Street, opposite the eastern end of the Flinders Street railway station. It became the Chelsea Theatre in 1960, became vacant in 1979, was demolished in 1986, and is now a car park.
