= Driving a Girl to Destruction =

- Directed by: George Marlow
- Based on: play by Mrs Morton Powell
- Produced by: George Marlow
- Starring: Louise Hampton
- Cinematography: Bert Ive
- Production company: Australian Picturised Drama Company
- Release date: November 1911
- Running time: 3,000 feet
- Country: Australia
- Languages: Silent film English intertitles

Driving a Girl to Destruction is an 1911 Australian film directed by George Marlow. It is considered a lost film.

== Plot of original play ==
The evil Lucas List has seduced Ruth Wright, and desires her cousin, conservative school teacher Ruby Wright, but she is engaged to Robert Ray, a lieutenant in the merchant marine. List arranges it so that Ray gets drunk and is persuaded to marry Ruth, who refuses to break it off with List. Ruby visits List's house at night to get her cousin away and is found there by Robert Ray. Ruby saves her cousin at the expense of her own reputation and winds up sacked from her teaching job. She inadvertently takes shelter with Madame de Meral, the owner of a brothel who works for List, but manages to escape. Ruby is starving on the streets with Ned, a crippled boy who has followed her, when List finds them. Ruby consents to go to his hotel to sleep with List. She changes her mind at the last minute but List insists. Ruth comes across them and tries to stab Ruby in a jealous frenzy, but ends up killing List instead. However it is Ruby who is arrested.

Ruth feels guilty and wants to confess but Madame de Meral tries to stop her and the two of them fight, in which Ruth is fatally wounded. However she manages to confess in time before dying and Robert and Ruby are married.

== Production ==
The film was made by the Australian Picturised Drama Company, which was established by theatre entrepreneur George Marlow at the Adelphi Theatre in Sydney. Marlow put on the play as well as filming it, using his regular acting troupe in both, including his wife, Ethel Buckley. He imported British stage stars Louise Hampton and Cecil Mannering to play the lead.

== Reception ==
Marlow's theatre production of the play was a success and toured widely but the film version had trouble obtaining distribution. This was due in part to the fact that audiences had only just seen the play. However the film did screen sporadically in country areas over the next few years.

== Cast ==
- Louise Hampton as Ruby
- Nellie Ferguson as Ruth
- Ethel Buckley as Betty
- Beth Murdoch
- Robert Inman
- Herbert Linden
- Frank Reis
- John Cosgrove
- Cecil Mannering
- H Nightingale
