= Frank Crossley (actor) =

Australian comedian and actor

Frank Harold Crossley (3 May 1874 – 11 August 1943) was an Australian comedian.

== History ==
Crossley was born at Kew, Victoria, the youngest of four children of Henry Crossley and Elizabeth Jane Crossley (née Barnes).

He appeared in companies led by George Rignold J. C. Williamson, William Anderson, George Marlow, and Bland Holt, best remembered for his role as "Karl Von Pumpernick", the polite lunatic, in an early Melbourne production of The Belle of New York and the burlesque Fun on the Bristol, which starred John F. Sheridan.

He enrolled with the First AIF in July 1916 and was posted to the 18th Reinforcements of the 23rd Battalion. He served overseas before being attached to the 1st Australian Concert Party, called The Anzac Coves, which was formed by General Birdwood, and became famous in England and Scotland.

Crossley died in a Melbourne hospital and his remains were interred at the Coburg Cemetery.

== Family ==
Crossley married singer and pianist Lilian Kathleen "Lily" Lloyd "Miss Iza Millet" ( – 15 May 1933) in 1899. They had two daughters:

- Iza Crossley (21 September 1899 – 1992) married Gordon Ireland. She was a singer and excellent swimmer She appeared (credited as "Isa Crossley") in the movies The Mystery of a Hansom Cab, and Diggers in Blighty, and perhaps The Scottish Covenanters of 1909.
- Moya Summerson Crossley (9 September 1901 – ) married Leslie Thomas Lonergan. She was a violinist and composer of several songs: "My Mother's Eyes", "My Home Town" and "A-U-double-S-I-E".

They had a home at 20 Service Crescent, South Melbourne.

He was a cousin of Ada Crossley.
