= Royal Standard Theatre =

Playhouse in Sydney, Australia

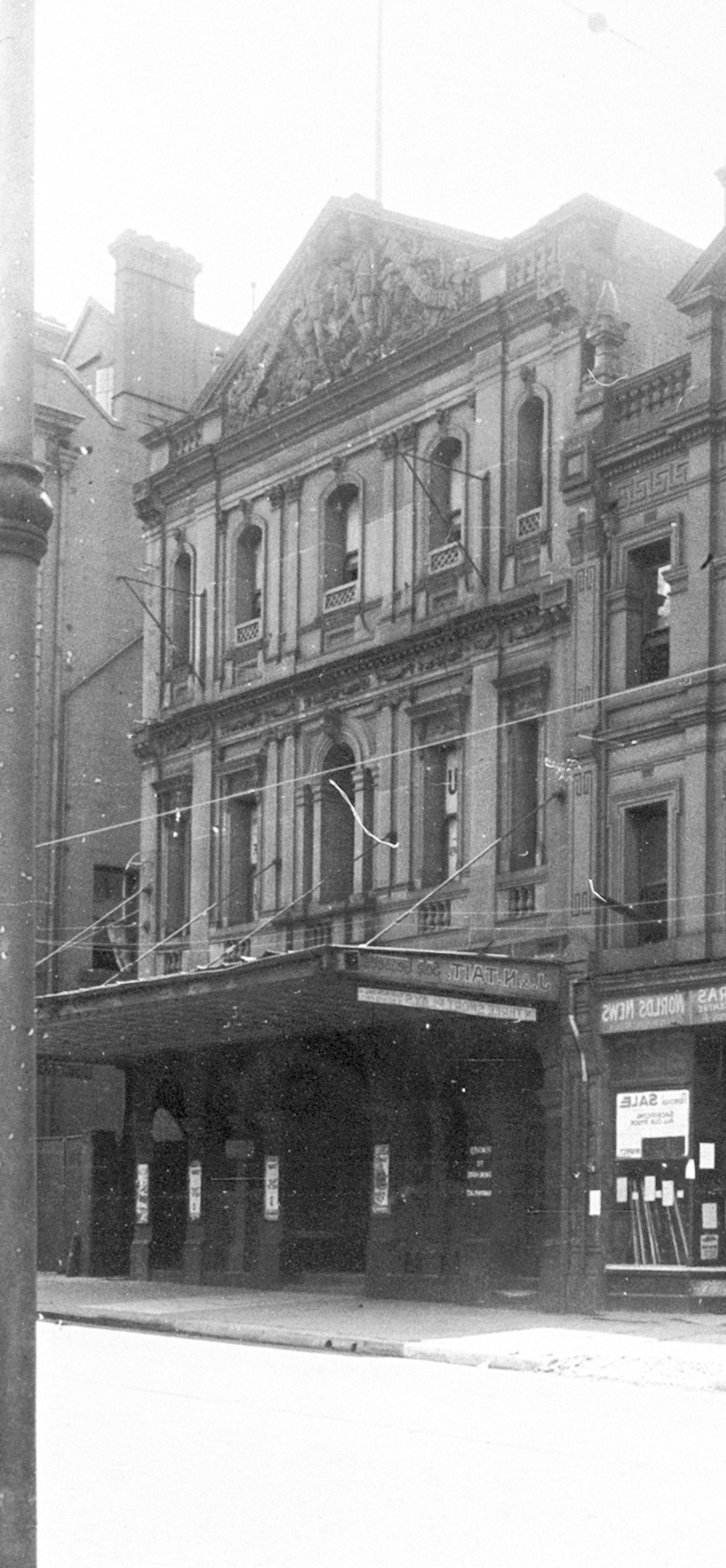
Royal Standard Theatre, shown in February 1923, shortly before its demolition

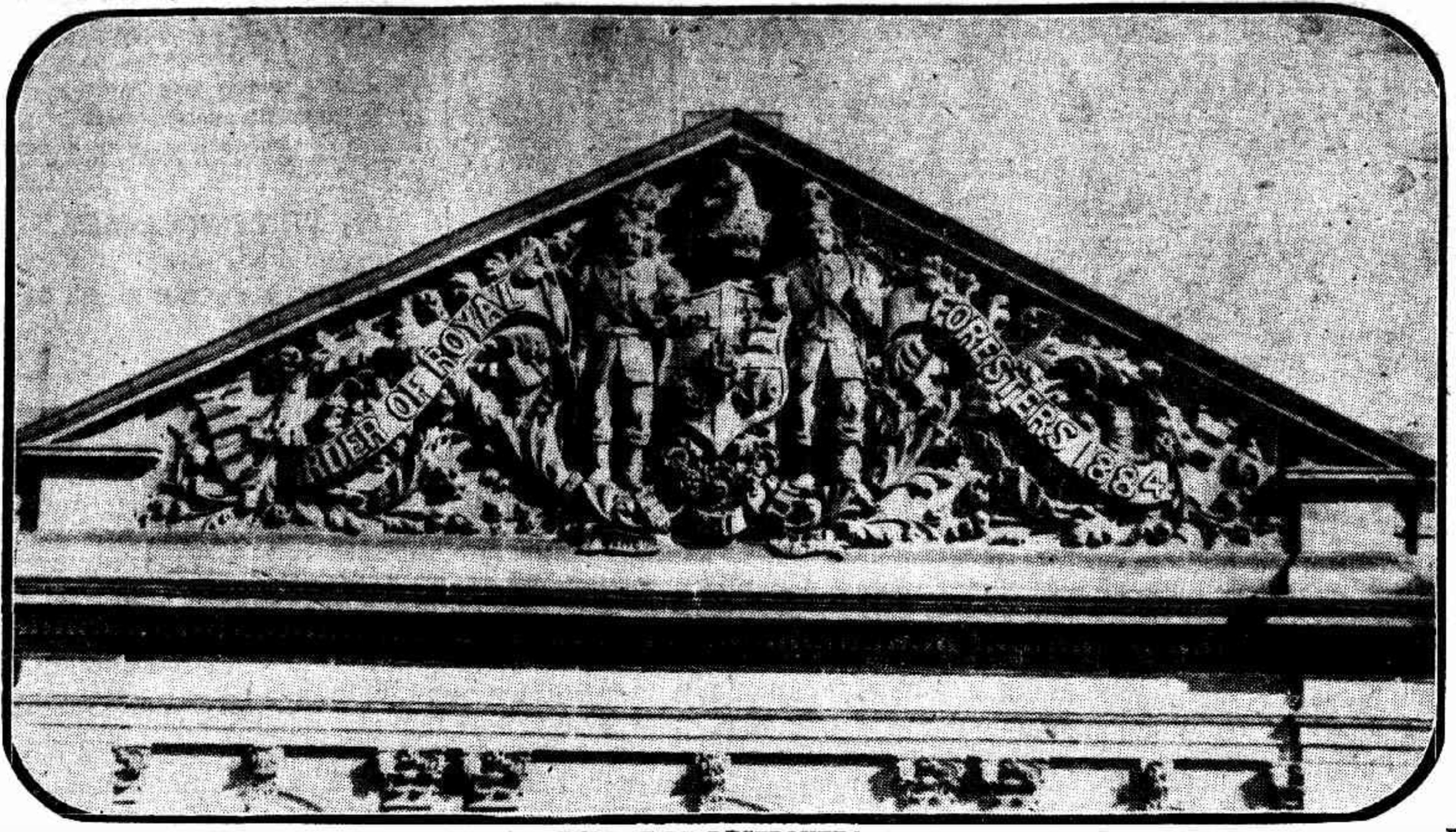
Carved facade – the Order of Royal Foresters 1884 – in April 1923, just prior to demolition

The Royal Standard Theatre, often referred to as the Standard Theatre was a small playhouse in Sydney, Australia, situated at 223 Castlereagh Street, near the Bathurst Street corner between Bathurst and Liverpool streets, and next to the fire station. It was later known as the Little Theatre and The Playhouse, and was demolished in the early 1920s.

== History ==
It was erected by the Royal Order of Foresters and opened on 8 May 1886. The theatre's first lessee was Frank Smith; theatre manager was Alfred Dampier, whose first production was The Flying Dutchman;

It became a boxing hall and the venue of a two-up school.

Hugh C. Buckler (9 September 1881 – 30 October 1936) and his wife Violet Paget. (Note: Not to be confused with the author Violet Paget (14 October 1856 – 13 February 1935)) arrived in Australia in 1910 as members of George Willoughby's Comedy Company.

Their son, John Buckler, would become a movie actor. Father and son moved to California in 1923; both died when their car left the road and plunged into Malibou Lake. The last heard of Paget was in 1926, when Buckler was in New York, playing in The Ladder, and his wife was suffering from "a bad attack of blood poisoning".

Sometime around 1912 Buckler purchased the building and had it fitted out to seat 1000 people, renaming it the Little Theatre. Their company included Lilian Lloyd, Tempo Piggott, Kenneth Bramston, and Arthur Cornell. Early productions were Harold MacGrath's The Man on the Box and Shaw's Fanny's First Play.

In 1913 Little Theatres Ltd was formed to purchase the theatre from Buckler. Founding directors were Buckler, C. A. Holliday and C. G. Derkenne. Wilton Welch was manager of the theatre from November 1913; Buckler produced Pinero's His House in Order in January 1914. Little Theatres Ltd. was wound up in March 1915.

George Willoughby was manager from June 1915, staging Broadhurst's farce The Wrong Mr Wright and Brandon Thomas's Charley's Aunt. Frederick Ward opened it in March 1916 and leased it to the Sydney Repertory Society; a notable production was Hindle Wakes, followed by The Second Mrs. Tanqueray, and The New Sin in conjunction with Sydney James, who in September 1917 took it over and renamed it The Playhouse. It was taken over by J. & N. Tait, renovated, and in March 1920 reopened with the "All Diggers" company playing Mademoiselle Mimi. In September 1920 the Irish comedian Gerald Griffin managed and starred in The Rose of Killarney and other musical plays. With the Taits' backing, Gregan McMahon resurrected the Sydney Repertory Society, and for them produced Granville Barker's The Voysey Inheritance at the Playhouse in March 1921, as an interim location while fitting out their own theatre (the old Concordia Hall at 150A Elizabeth Street).

The building was purchased by the government and demolished in 1923 to make way for the six-storey South Sydney Telephone Exchange, which opened in March 1925.

The theatre never enjoyed tremendous patronage, being a little out of the way, and perhaps hard to find; a common joke was that the best way to find the Little Theatre was to ring the fire alarm and go back on the fire engine.
