= George Marlow =

Australian theatrical entrepreneur

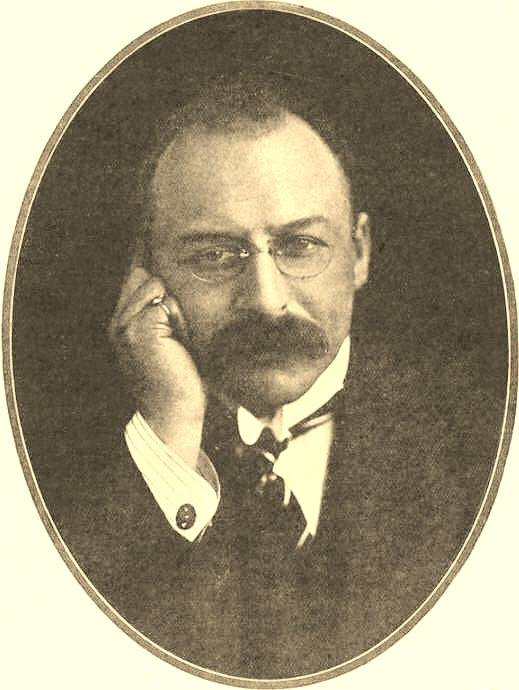
George Marlow

George Marlow (24 September 1876 – 21 May 1939) (born Joseph Marks) was an Australian theatrical entrepreneur born in London of Jewish extraction, noted for bringing melodrama and pantomime to Sydney audiences in the early 1900s. His name has been frequently mis-spelled as "George Marlowe".

== History ==
Marlow was born Joseph Lewis Marks (or Marx) to Morris Marks (1834 – 21 January 1920) and his wife Celia Marks, née Jones, (1835 – 29 December 1898). Among his siblings were A. Adolph Marks (c. 1871 – 22 May 1956), who would establish A. A. Marks Ltd., wholesale tobacconists, and Alfred Isaac Marks (c. 1873 – 21 August 1947), later business manager for George Marlow Dramatic Company and treasurer of several of Marlow's theatres, and married actress Miss Elwyn Harvey on 24 December 1913.

He came to Australia as a child, and started acting and playing piano for stage plays. He was playing with the William Anderson organisation in Sydney and Brisbane in 1899 as was Ethel Buckley (born c. 1885), whom he married around 1901. Ethel had made a mark as "Puck" in a George Rignold production of Midsummer Night's Dream at the age of twelve, a role she reprised several times, then melodramas such as The Luck of Roaring Camp in 1907. She worked six months in London After her marriage (c. 1910) to Marlow, she starred in his shows. Her most famous role was as "Cigarette" in an adaptation of the Ouida novel Under Two Flags in 1915.

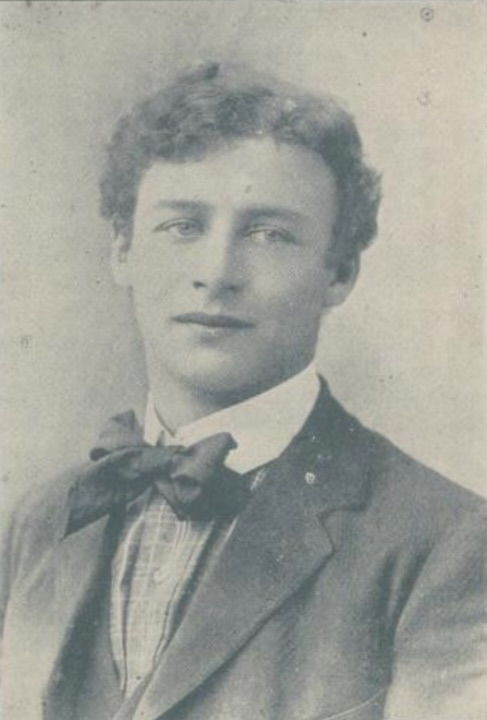
George Marlow in 1907

He became involved in the managerial side of the theatre, first with William Anderson, then from around 1904 with the Fuller family chain. By 1907 he had his own company, first leasing a theatre in Newcastle. By Christmas 1910 he was lessee of, then a year later purchased the Princess's Theatre, Melbourne. In 1911 he built The Adelphi, in Castlereagh Street, Haymarket, Sydney, the largest theatre in Australia. The Bad Girl of the Family was his first production in the new theatre, followed by the George Fowler musical The Fatal Wedding and the melodrama The Rosary. He took The Bad Girl of the Family to London around the same time. They were still in UK in 1912

After purchasing the Princess's Theatre, he hired as manager of The Adelphi George Willoughby (full name George Willoughby Dowse), who made a great success of it. Willoughby, with Arthur Bernard Davies and George T. Eaton bought him out in 1913, reportedly for £50,000, but had problems with Marlow's continuing involvement. In 1915 Marlow in partnership with Ben Fuller bought out Willoughby. and 1916 renamed it the Grand Opera House. Some years later it became the Tivoli.

Marlow also directed some feature films, Driving a Girl to Destruction (1911) and Angel of his Dreams (1912).

== His leading actors ==
Around 1910, the 15-year old Louise Lovely (then as Louise Carbasse) was one of his "stars". Other noted actors in his troupes included Arthur Shirley, Nellie Bramley and Vera Spaull.

Although he claimed not to be interested in producing "classics", he managed the Grand Shakespearean Company from 1916–1920 at the Princess, with such hits as The Merchant of Venice starring Allan Wilkie.

== Later years ==
In partnership with Nacio Herb Brown, he produced The Sneak in 1922.

By 1925 The Grand Opera House had become rather unfashionable. In 1929 he partnered with Ernest C. Rolls to produce revue Clowns in Clover and Whoopee at The Empire. Both failed and Marlow-Rolls Theatres collapsed owing £50,000.

He produced a Christmas pantomime Beauty and the Beast around 1930 at the Grand Opera House with songs by the great cricketer Don Bradman and Jack Lumsdaine, Billy Moll, Harry Richman and Murray Mencher.

He was a longtime racing enthusiast, owning horses including Trinobantes, Somnolent, Halifax and Georgio, and was for a time on the Tattersall's Club committee.

George and Ethel were still together in 1937, even appearing in a pantomime. He died in a Sydney nursing home, survived by his wife (died 8 September 1958) and a daughter Marie. His estate was valued at £30,110. They had a home "Franconia", 123 Macleay Street, Potts Point, Sydney.

== Select credits ==
- Humping the Bluey (1911) - stage play
