= Queensland Police Service =

State police service in Queensland, Australia

- Badge of the Queensland Police

- Flag of the Queensland Police
- Motto: With Honour We Serve "Firmness with Courtesy" until 1990

Agency overview
- Formed: 1 January 1864

Jurisdictional structure
- Operations jurisdiction: Queensland, Australia
- Queensland Police jurisdiction
- Area: 1,727,000 square kilometres (667,000 sq mi)
- Population: 5,160,023 (2020)
- Legal jurisdiction: As per operations jurisdiction
- Governing body: Queensland Government
- General nature: Civilian police

Operational structure
- Headquarters: 200 Roma Street, Brisbane
- 27.4664°S 153.0182°E
- Police officers: 13,011 (April 2026)
- Staff members: Over 5,000 (June 2026)
- Minister responsible: Daniel Purdie, Minister for Police and Community Safety
- Agency executive: Brett Pointing, Commissioner
- Units: List: Child Protection and Investigation Unit; Special Emergency Response Team; Tactical Crime Squad

Facilities
- Stations: 340 (2025)

Website
- www.police.qld.gov.au

The Queensland Police Service (QPS) is the principal law enforcement agency in the Australian state of Queensland. The QPS has its origins in colonial-era constabularies, and was constituted as a unified organisation in 1864. In 1990, the Queensland Police Force was renamed the Queensland Police Service and its previous motto of "Firmness with Courtesy" was changed to "With Honour We Serve". The headquarters of the Queensland Police Service is located at 200 Roma Street, Brisbane. As of 2026, the QPS employs over 18,000 personnel, including 13,000 police officers and 5,000 staff members.

The current Commissioner is Brett Pointing. The Commissioner reports to the Minister for Police, presently Daniel Purdie.

== History ==
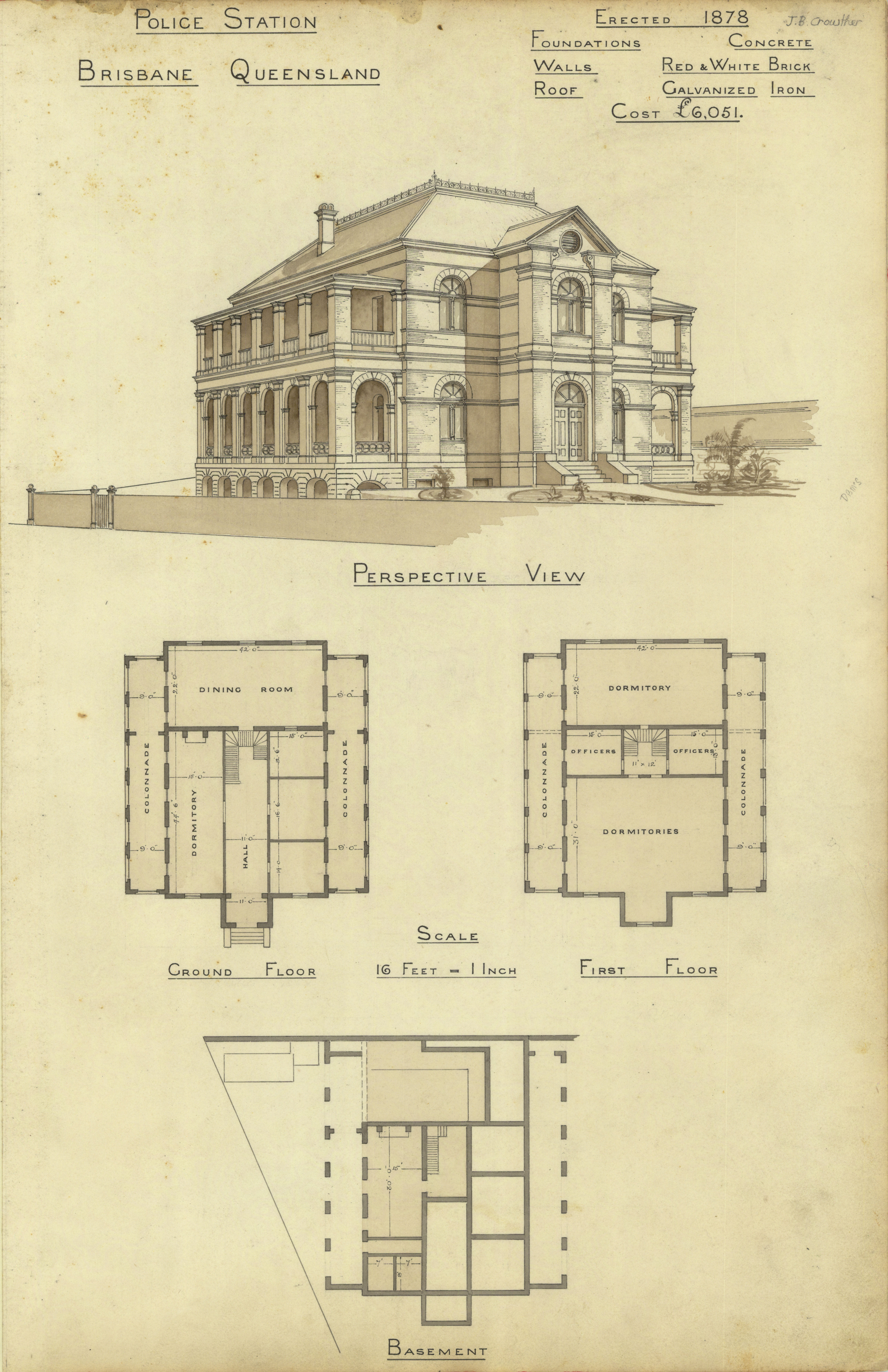
Roma Street Police Station, Brisbane, erected 1878

Queensland came into existence as a colony of the British Empire on 1 December 1859. The region was previously under the jurisdiction of the New South Wales governance with towns policed by small forces controlled by the local magistracy. The Police Act of 1838 (2 Vic. no. 2) which officially codified a variety of common behaviours as criminal and regulated the police response to them, continued as the template for policing. On 13 January 1860, Edric Norfolk Vaux Morisset was appointed the Inspector-General of the Queensland Police. Queensland was divided into 17 districts, each with its own police force headed by a Chief Constable under authority of a local magistrate. The position of Inspector-General was abolished soon after it was established, in July 1860, and most of the operations of the police until 1863 reverted to the control of local police magistrates and justices.

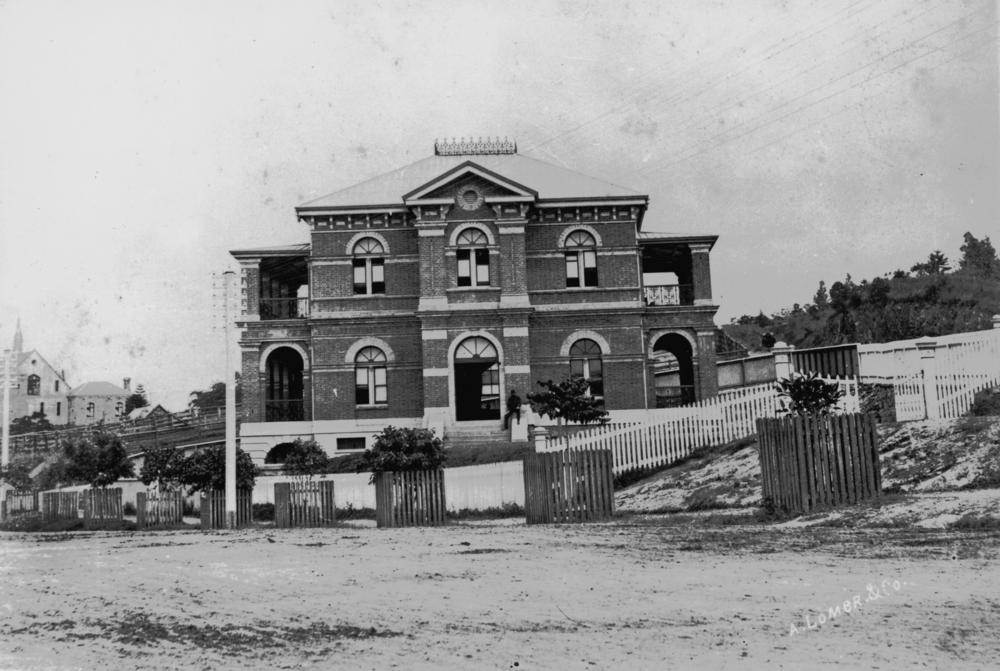
Roma Street Police Station, 1883

The Queensland Police underwent a major reform in 1864 and the newly re-organised force commenced operations with approximately 143 employees under the command the first Commissioner of Police, David Thompson Seymour. The service had four divisions: Metropolitan Police, Rural Police, Water Police, and Native Police. At the turn of the century there were 845 men and 135 Aboriginal trackers at 256 stations in Queensland.

=== 1900s ===
In 1904 the Queensland Police started to use fingerprinting in investigations. In the 1912 Brisbane general strike the Queensland Police were used to suppress striking workers. The first female police officers, Ellen O'Donnell and Zara Dare, were inducted in March 1931 to assist in inquiries involving female suspects and prisoners. Following World War II a number of technological innovations were adopted including radio for communication within Queensland and between state departments. By 1950 the Service had a staff of 2,030 police officers, 10 women police and 30 trackers. In February 1951, a central communication room was established at the Criminal Investigation Branch in Brisbane.

=== 1960s and 1970s ===
On 14 May 1963, the Juvenile Aid Bureau was established. In 1965 female officers were given the same powers as male officers. The Queensland Police Academy at Oxley, Brisbane, was completed in 1972. Bicycles were phased out in 1975 and more cars and motorcycles were put into service. The Air Wing also became operational in 1975 following the purchase of two single-engine aircraft.

=== 1980s ===
The decade was a turbulent period in Queensland's political history. Allegations of high-level corruption in both the Queensland Police and State Government led to a judicial inquiry presided over by Tony Fitzgerald. The Fitzgerald Inquiry which ran from July 1987 to July 1989 led to charges being laid against many long-serving police, including Jack Herbert, Licensing Branch Sergeant Harry Burgess, Assistant Commissioner Graeme Parker and Commissioner Terry Lewis. Lewis was jailed and served ten and a half years.

The Fitzgerald Inquiry also led to a perjury trial against former Premier Joh Bjelke-Petersen, which ended with a hung jury. The Director of Public Prosecutions elected not to pursue a retrial due to Bjelke-Petersen's age and health. It was later revealed that the jury foreman for the trial was a member of the Young Nationals and identified with the 'friends of Joh' movement.

The Criminal Justice Commission was established in 1989 by the Queensland Criminal Justice Act 1989, following widespread corruption amongst high-level Queensland politicians and police officers being uncovered in the Fitzgerald Inquiry. It has since merged in 2002 with the Queensland Crime Commission to form the Crime and Misconduct Commission. The Criminal Justice Commission was responsible for significant research into the Queensland Police Service.

A new computerised message switching system was put into use throughout Queensland in 1980. At the time it was one of the most effective police communication systems in Australia.

=== 1990s ===
The Police Powers and Procedures Act 1997 was passed by the Queensland Government on 1 July 1997 and took effect 6 April 1998. Law enforcement equipment introduced in the 1990s include oleoresin capsicum (OC) spray, the Smith & Wesson revolver firearm and later the Glock semi-automatic pistol, the long 26" baton to the 21" extendable baton, and linked to hinged handcuffs in 1998, and Light Detection and Ranging (LIDAR) laser-based detection devices and an Integrated Traffic Camera System in 1999 to enforce traffic speed limits.

=== 2000s ===
The Police Powers and Responsibilities Act 2000 came into force in July 2000 which consolidated the majority of police powers into one Act. The Queensland Police contributed to the national CrimTrac system and the National Automated Fingerprint Identification System (NAFIS), established in 2000. The Crime and Misconduct Act 2001 commenced 1 January 2002 and redefined the responsibilities of the Service and the Crime and Misconduct Commission (CMC) with respect to the management of complaints. The CMC also has a witness protection function. The CMC has investigative powers, not ordinarily available to the Queensland Police, for the purposes of enabling the commission to effectively investigate particular cases of major crime. The CMC also has the power to investigate cases of misconduct in the Queensland public sector, particularly the more serious cases of misconduct. In 2013, the CMC became the Crime and Corruption Commission.

In 2002 there were 8,367 police officers (20.2% female) and 2,925 staff members at 321 stations, 40 Police Beat shopfronts and 21 Neighbourhood Police Beats throughout the state. By 2004 the Service had grown to 9,003 police officers (21.8% female) and 2,994 other staff members. As at 30 June 2016 there were 11,971 police officers (26.3% female) and 2,794 other staff members.

The Taser conducted electrical weapon (CEW) was trialled by some officers in 2006 and was eventually issued in 2009. In mid-2007, approximately 5,000 officers participated in the Pride in Policing march through Brisbane.

=== 2010s ===
In 2013 following a change in government, another government department named the Public Safety Business Agency was created. This was following a recommendation of the Keelty review into police and community safety operations. Human resources, information technology and other divisions were transferred from the Service and other departments to the new agency. In mid-2016, some services were moved back to the Service. Eight geographic regions (Far Northern, Northern, Central, North Coast, Metropolitan North, Metropolitan South, Southern, and South Eastern) was reduced to five (Northern, Central, Southern, Brisbane, South Eastern). Some statewide functions and administrative divisions were also adjusted.

Following the G20 political forum, the Service created its third unit citation. The other two Queensland Honours citations were the 'flood and cyclone' (2011) and the 'QP150' (2014) for the Service's sesquicentennial year.

The Queensland Police marked 150 years of service to the State of Queensland on 1 January 2014.

In 2015 the Commissioner approved officers and staff members to march in the Brisbane Pride Festival as part of showing organisational diversity, and accessibility of policing services to the LGBTI communities.

=== 2020s ===
In February 2020, an organisational restructure was announced; but a month later, staffing then being diverted to support the health response to the COVID-19 pandemic, including border closures, and maintaining quarantine hotels. Early in 2021, due to two separate incidents, a new 'Youth Crime Taskforce' was formed under an assistant commissioner, and another section was elevated to command level to become the Domestic, Family Violence and Vulnerable Persons Command.

A commission of inquiry was created in May 2022 to examine policing responses to domestic and family violence prevention, with an August appearance of Commissioner Carroll. The commission was told of a lack of staffing of the Domestic, Family Violence and Vulnerable Persons Command compared to other areas, of discrimination within the organisation, and of senior officers' racist and misogynistic behaviour. A deputy commissioner resigned the next day.

In October 2022, following a review by State Disaster Coordinator Steve Gollschewski (then a deputy commissioner, later Commissioner), it was announced the Queensland Fire and Emergency Services (QFES) would be dissolved in June 2024, resulting in the largest reform of emergency services in Queensland since 1990. The Queensland Fire and Rescue Service along with the Rural Fire Service would form the Queensland Fire Department, with a new central headquarters. On Monday 3 June 2024 the State Emergency Service (SES) was moved to the Queensland Police Service; along with the Volunteer Marine Rescue and the Australian Volunteer Coast Guard Queensland, becoming the new Marine Rescue Queensland (MRQ) and therefore made part of the Queensland emergency services.

== Criticisms ==
The Queensland Police Special Bureau was formed on 30 July 1940 and renamed Special Branch on 7 April 1948. It was criticised for being used for political purposes by the Bjelke-Petersen government in the 1970s and 1980s, such as enforcing laws against protests (sometimes outnumbering the protesters or using provocateurs to incite violence so the protesters could be arrested) and investigating and harassing political opponents. It was disbanded in 1989 following a recommendation by the Fitzgerald Inquiry into police corruption. Special Branch records were shredded.

In 1991, an arrest was recorded by journalist Chris Reason on live TV. In the video, a plain clothes officer and other officers are seen restraining a man and putting him in the back of a car. The man was reportedly an international criminal from Europe but it was later found to be some one else. This was an embarrassment for the QPS and it came to be known as 'Democracy Manifest'.

In 1994 six police officers, becoming known as the 'Pinkenba Six', took three Aboriginal boys from Fortitude Valley and left them at Pinkenba as an unofficial way to punish the boys for suspected offences. The police officers were charged with abduction but were subsequently acquitted in court; the police service put them on twelve months probation for their errors of judgement.

The Service has been accused of institutional racism after its fierce support of Senior Sergeant Chris Hurley who stood trial for the 2004 assault and manslaughter of Mulrunji Doomadgee. Senior Sergeant Hurley was initially subject of a Coronial Inquest by Coroner Christine Clements where he was found to have a case to answer despite conflicting medical evidence. The Director of Public Prosecutions Leanne Clare refused to place Senior Sergeant Hurley on trial for lack of evidence. After reviewing the evidence the Crime and Misconduct Commission (CMC) also found that there was insufficient evidence to prosecute for wrongdoing. The Queensland Attorney General Kerry Shine ordered a review despite advice from the State Solicitor-General Walter Sofronoff QC highlighting the lack of evidence. A review by New South Wales Former Chief Justice Sir Laurence Street found there was a case to answer. Senior Sergeant Hurley was found not guilty by a jury in the Townsville Supreme Court and the findings of the Coronial Inquest were subsequently overturned by the Queensland District Court. The District Court ruled that Coroner's finding '...was against the weight of the evidence'.

Also in 2006 and 2008 footage was caught of police beating homeless men after they were pinned to the ground. It came a year after a report by organisations including the Queensland Council of Social Service (QCOSS) and community groups such as the Red Cross, which detailed widespread harassment by police of the socially vulnerable. Approximately 75% of interviewees made such claims, but the report was ignored by the government. Police Minister Judy Spence said of the report 'At a cursory glance, it looks like a compendium of views from nameless, homeless people'.

In 2008, the CMC investigated an officer after he used a Taser on a restrained teenage girl at South Bank, but recommended the officer only receive 'managerial guidance'. The incident was also against police policy to use tasers on minors. Police later charged the girl with breaching a move on order, but the case was thrown out with the magistrate criticising police's over-reaction. A subsequent inquiry by the CMC into the use of the TASER by the Queensland Police Service found there was no systemic abuse of the device by officers, despite the chairman saying the incident 'showed a concerning pattern within QPS towards the handling of policing incidents'. CCTV video footage was released, delayed by possible civil action, showing the girl lashing out and kicking the officer, knocking the Taser out of his holster before he used it as she was held on the ground by two security guards.

In June 2009 a man died after allegedly being tasered by Queensland police 28 times. The policeman in question claimed the deceased was tasered a much lower number of times, suggesting the device was making erroneous readings. The coronial inquest later found this not to be the case, and that the officer tasered the man 28 times for up to five seconds at a time.

In early 2010 searches were made by the CMC (Crime and Misconduct Commission) on police stations in Queensland. The results of the searches and interrogations of police officers are being kept confidential, but come less than a year after a CMC report claiming:

the evidence revealed an attitude on the part of a not insignificant number of police officers, and their supervisors, that it was acceptable to act in ways that ignored legislative and QPS policy requirements, that were improper, and in some cases were dishonest and unlawful. Based on past experiences, the CMC had no confidence that the attitudes of those police officers would change without the pressure of public exposure.

The CMC report focused on police corruption, and not police brutality that accounted for ten times as many complaints in Surfers Paradise – 130 reports to 13 in the 18 months to March 2010.

In 2016 several human rights organisations signed an open letter calling for a public investigation the Queensland Police Service, and for preventative measures to be implemented against police abuse.

Queensland police were criticised for using excessive force against protesters in 2021.

Arising from an earlier Women's Safety and Justice Taskforce, in May 2022 a commission of inquiry was announced to examine policing responses to domestic and family violence prevention, with possible systemic cultural issues within the organisation, and whether there was the capability, capacity, and structure to respond to the violence. Giving evidence in August 2022, Police Commissioner Carroll accepted 'there was a problem within QPS with misogynistic and disrespectful views towards women affecting how police officers responded to domestic and family violence'. In October 2022, there were calls for reforms and deeper investigations into Queensland police by figures such as Opposition MP David Crisafulli and human rights activist Gracelyn Smallwood.

== Regions ==
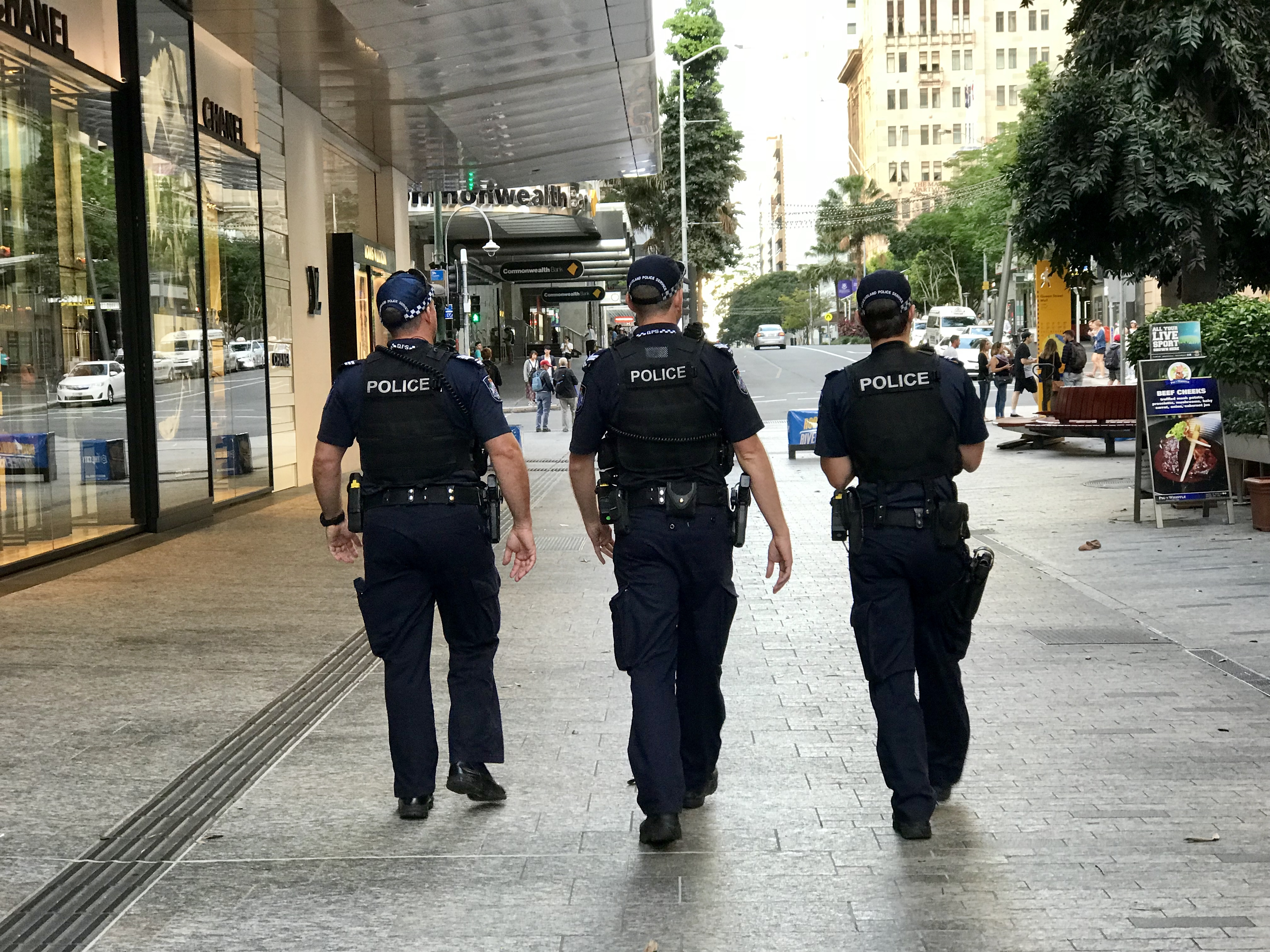
Officers on patrol in Brisbane

Between 1991 and 2013 there were eight geographic regions (Far Northern, Northern, Central, North Coast, Metropolitan North, Metropolitan South, Southern, and South Eastern), three commands (State Crime Operations, Operations Support, and Ethical Standards), and four divisions (Human Resources, Finance, Administration, and Information Management).

As of 2017, there are seven police regions and eight commands in the State of Queensland, each under command of an assistant commissioner. By 2020, there were four administrative areas, each overseen by a deputy commissioner organizing the respective regions and commands as such: Regional Operations (Northern, Central, Brisbane, Southern, and South Eastern), Specialist Operations (Community Contact Command, Intelligence, Counter-Terrorism and Major Events Command, Operations Support Command, State Crime Command, Road Policing Command, and Commonwealth Games Group), and Strategy, Policy and Performance (Crime and Corruption Commission Police Group, Ethical Standards Command, Legal Division, Organisational Capability Command, and People Capability Command). The regions were further divided into districts and further still into divisions. A new government department, the Public Safety Business Agency, existed from 2013 to 2021 which took over the portfolios of human resources, finance, administration, education and training, and information technology).

By 2023, with the announced incorporation of the Disaster & Emergency Management into the QPS from the Queensland Fire and Emergency Services, the QPS Organisation Structure took on the following form:

- Regional Operations
  - Far Northern Region
  - Northern Region
  - Central Region
  - North Coast Region
  - Brisbane Region
  - South Eastern Region
  - Southern Region
- Regional Services
  - Operations Support Command
  - Road Policing and Regional Support Command
  - Domestic, Family Violence and Vulnerable Persons Command
  - People Capability Command
  - Communications, Culture and Engagement Division
- Strategy and Corporate Services
  - Finance Services Division
  - Frontline and Digital Services
  - Human Resources Division
  - Health, Safety and Wellbeing Division
  - Organisational Capability Command
  - Policy and Performance Division
  - Weapons Licensing Group
- Specialist Operations
  - Crime and Intelligence Command
  - Crime and Corruption Commission Police Group
  - Security and Counter-Terrorism Command
  - Legal Division
  - Ethical Standards Command
  - Internal Audit
  - Chief Risk Officer
  - Youth Crime Task Force
- Disaster and Emergency Management
  - Reform Implementation Task Force
  - State Disaster Coordinator
  - Disaster Response and Management
  - Olympic Games Group
- State Discipline
- Special Coordinator – Police and Emergency Services Reform

The Service commenced another restructure and organisational unit renaming commencing from late 2025.

== Ranks and structure ==
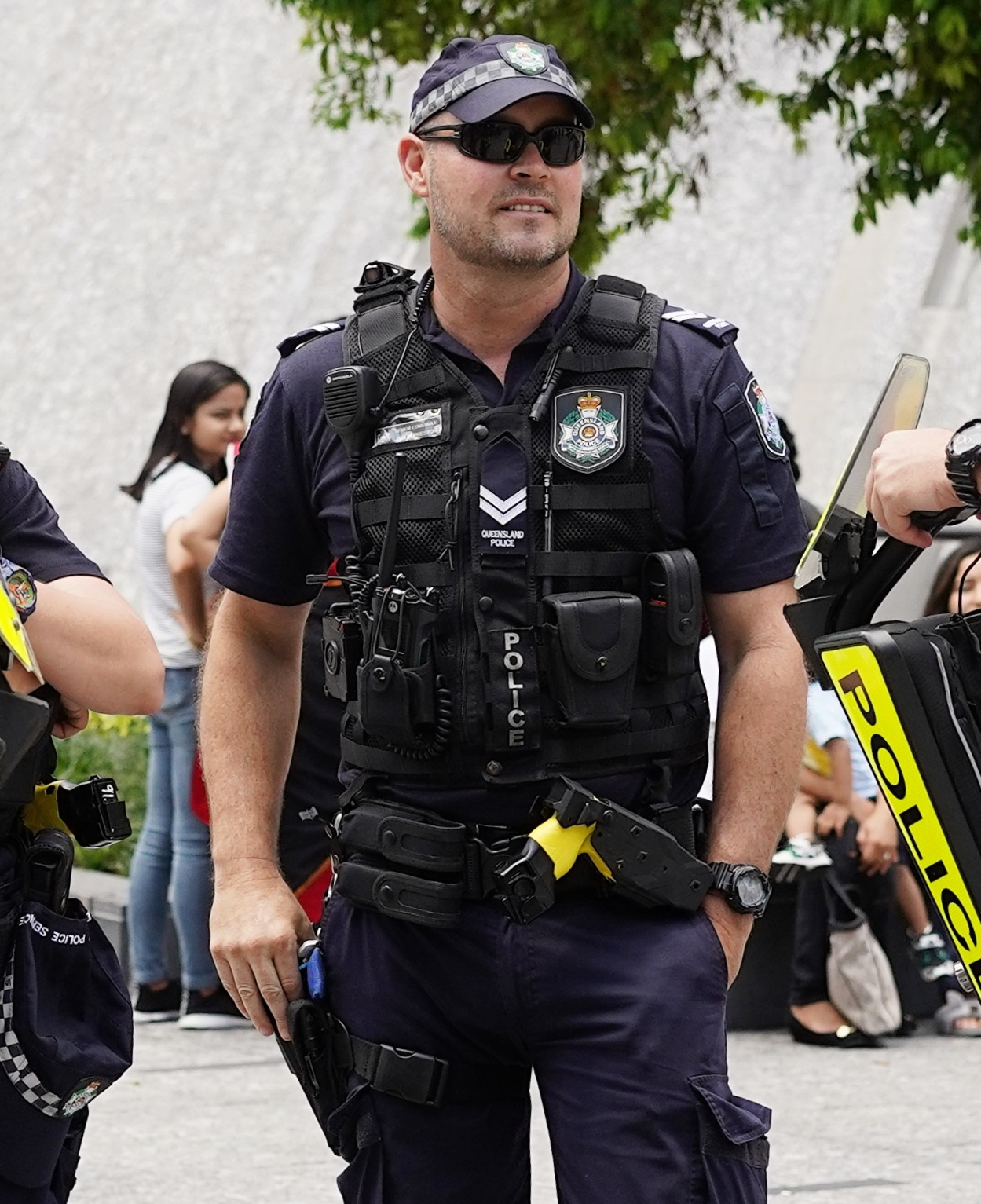
A Queensland Police officer in standard uniform

The Queensland Police Service has two classes of uniformed personnel: police officers ('sworn' and 'unsworn'), (Note: Each state legislation defines the organisational structure and terms. In Queensland, employees are either police officers, staff members, or police recruits, collectively referred to as 'members of the Service'. The Police Service Administration Regulation 1990 provides an oath of office ('sworn') and affirmation of office ('unsworn'). The latter caters for a variety of police officers including those who do not have religious beliefs.) and staff members (public servants, including police liaison officers, watchhouse officers, protective services officers and pipes and drums musicians). Both classes wear the same blue uniform with shoulder patches.

As of 2015 all police officer rank insignia changed to an 'ink blue' background with insignia embroidered in white. There has been the addition of a 'recognition of service' horizontal bar between rank insignia and the words 'Queensland Police' for officers who have been on rank for a particular length of time. This 'recognition of service' is only for the ranks from senior constable to senior sergeant.

In 2023 the rank of chief inspector was reintroduced into the Service.

Rank insignia is worn only by uniformed officers. Prior to mid-2009, only officers at the rank of inspector and above (commissioned officers) had the words 'Queensland Police' embroidered on their epaulettes, however new uniform mandates saw the introduction of the words 'Queensland Police' on all epaulettes issued to police officers after this date. The epaulettes of commissioned officers are significantly larger than the epaulettes of lesser ranks. Different salary bands apply within the same rank commensurate with years of service. Officers relieving at a higher rank temporarily wear the epaulettes of the higher rank.

Police recruits wear a light blue epaulette with embroidered 'POLICE RECRUIT'.

Police recruits undertaking the PACE program wear a dark blue epaulette with no embroided text.

Police officers and other members may be eligible to wear Queensland and Australian honours.

=== Constable ranks ===
- Constable (plain blue)
  - Special constable (plain blue with text "Special Constable")
- Senior constable (two embroidered chevrons)
  - Leading senior constable (title; two embroidered chevrons with two bars underneath)

=== Sergeant ranks ===
- Sergeant (three embroidered chevrons)
- Senior sergeant (embroidered crown with laurels)

=== Commissioned ranks ===
- Inspector (three pips)
  - Chief inspector (one crown) (re-introduced as a title in 2023)
- Superintendent (one crown and one pip)
- Chief superintendent (one crown and two pips)
- Assistant commissioner (crossed tipstaves with laurels)
- Deputy commissioner (one pip and crossed tipstaves with laurels)
- Commissioner (one crown and crossed tipstaves with laurels)

Recruits, constables, sergeants
Recruit	Recruit (PACE Program)	Special constable	Constable	Senior; Constable	Leading senior constable	Sergeant	Senior sergeant

Commissioned officers
Inspector	Chief inspector	Superintendent	Chief superintendent	Assistant commissioner	Deputy commissioner	Commissioner

=== Staff member epaulettes ===
Several staff member roles wear a uniform similar to police officers.

In 2016 the State Government Protective Security Service (SGPSS), then under the Department of Public Works, was transferred to the Queensland Police Service and renamed the Protective Services Group. Protective services officers are sworn or affirmed (Note: Protective services officers swear a different oath or make a different affirmation than that made by sworn or affirmed police officers, under Part 2 of the Police Service Administration Regulation 2016.) staff members, and wear an ink-navy shirt with a maroon-coloured police shoulder patch with 'Protective Services' above it, and maroon epaulettes.

Staff member uniform includes:

- assistant watchhouse officers (grey epaulettes stating 'watchhouse officer')
- pipes and drums musicians (hard board epaulettes and with pipes and drums wording)
- police liaison officer (PLO) (yellow epaulettes with embroidered 'POLICE LIAISON OFFICER' or 'SENIOR POLICE LIAISON OFFICER'; a 'Police Liaison Officer' hat badge, with a yellow-chequered hat band)
- protective services officer (maroon epaulettes with embroidered 'PROTECTIVE SERVICES' and 'PROTECTIVE SERVICES OFFICER' OR 'SENIOR PROTECTIVE SERVICES OFFICER'. Additionally, horizontal white bars indicate the officer's public service pay grade.)
- Torres Strait Island police liaison officer (green/white/blue epaulettes with embroidered 'TORRES STRAIT ISLAND POLICE LIAISON OFFICER' and rank)

Chaplains, whilst not employed by the Service, wear a uniform with purple epaulettes with embroidered 'POLICE CHAPLAIN'.

== Specialist areas ==
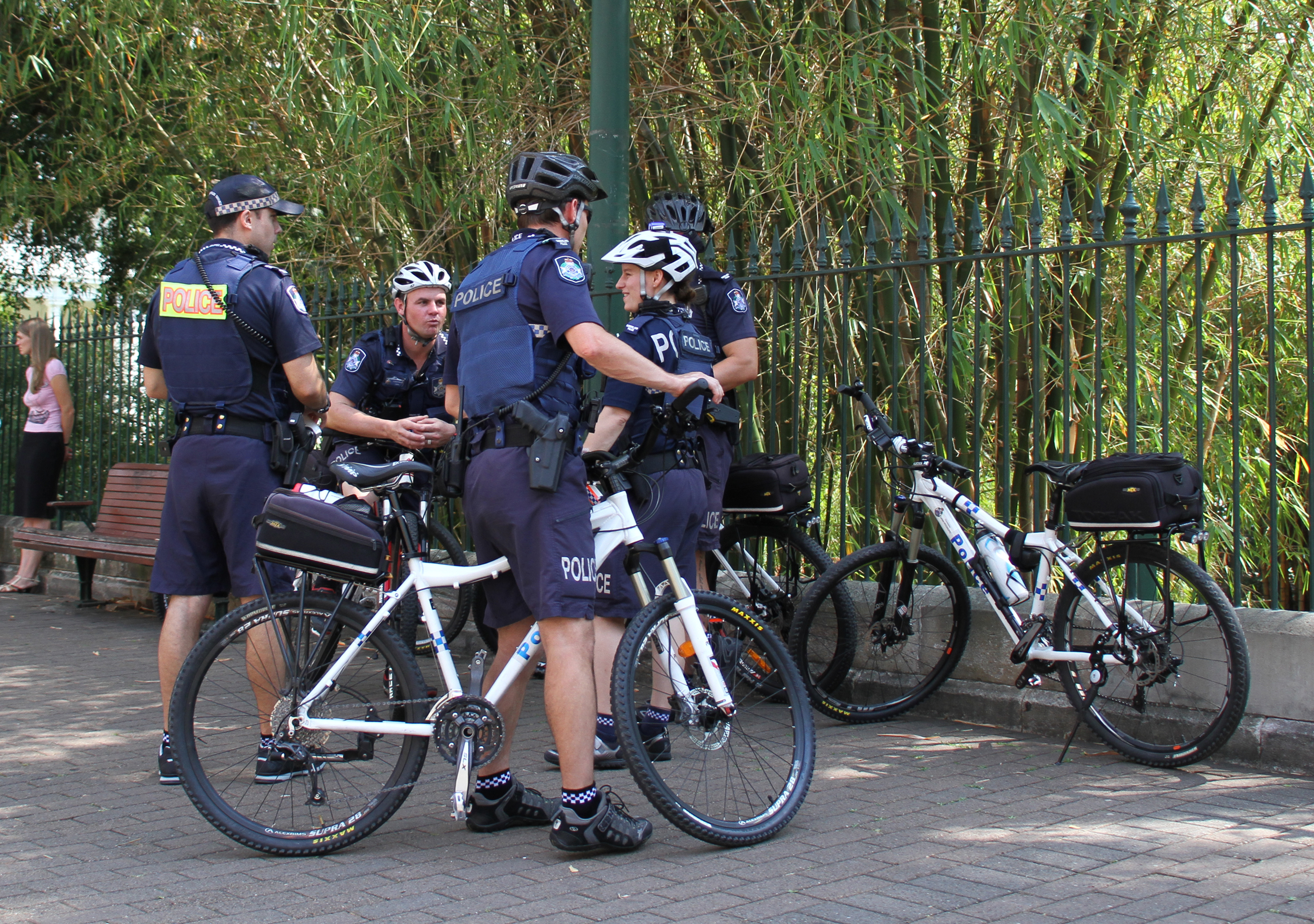
Officers patrolling on bicycles

Officers must serve a minimum of three years in general duties before being permitted to serve in specialist areas such as:

- Child Protection and Investigation Unit (CPIU), formerly the Juvenile Aid Bureau (JAB)
- Criminal Investigation Branch (CIB)
- Dog Squad
- Explosive Ordnance Response Team (EORT)
- Forensic Crash Unit, formerly the Accident Investigation Squad (AIS), and before that, the Traffic Accident Investigation Squad (TAIS)
- Forensic Services Branch
- Mounted Unit
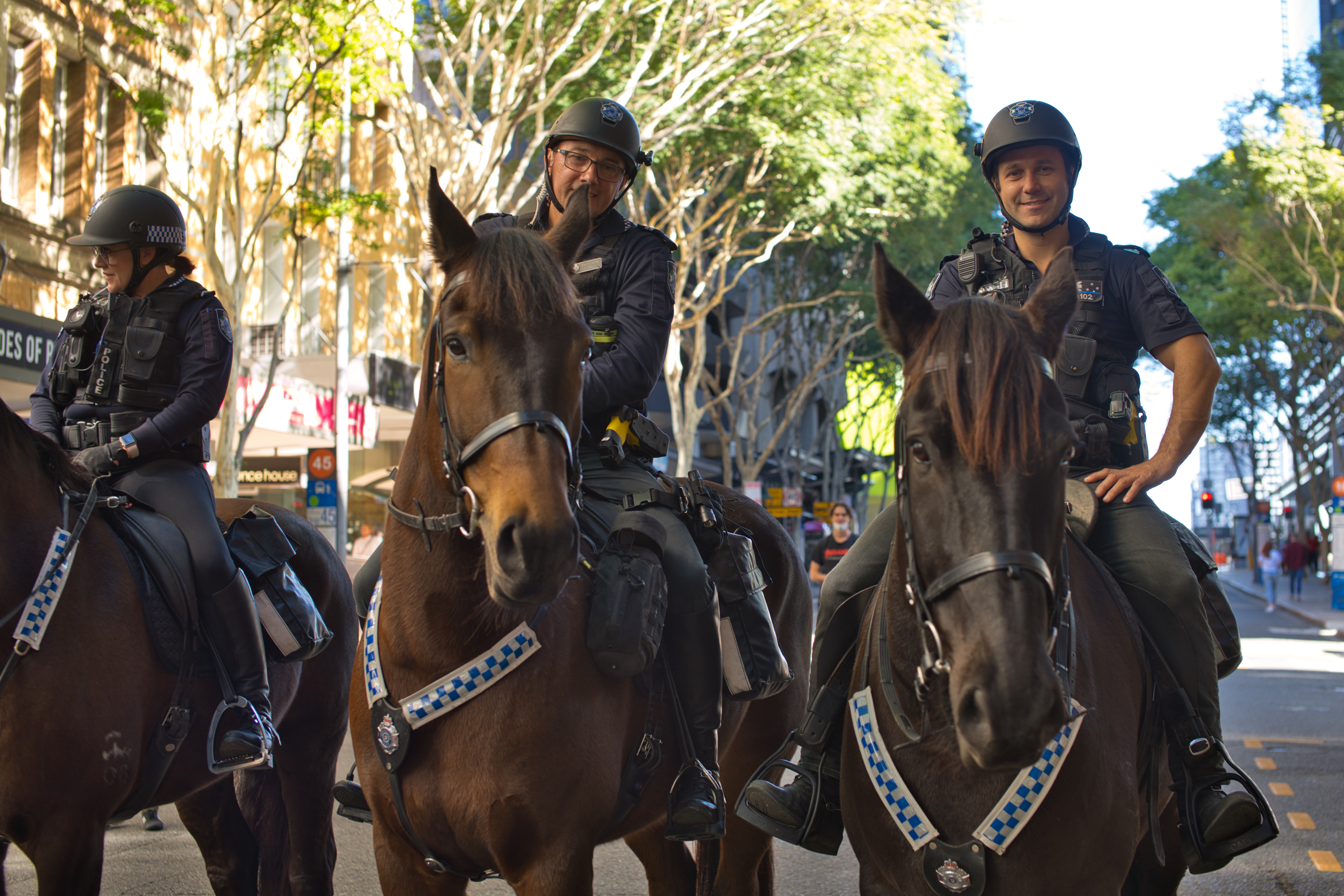
  Mounted Police at a protest (2020).
- Police Prosecutions Corps (PPC)
- Railway Squad
- Scenes of Crime
- Special Emergency Response Team (SERT)
- Major and Organised Crime (Rural) (MOCS), formerly Stock and Regional Crime Investigation Squad (SARCIS), formerly the Stock Squad
- Taskforce Maxima (investigating, disrupting and dismantling outlaw motorcycle gangs)
- Highway Patrol, formerly road policing units (RPU), formerly Traffic Branch
- Intelligence analyst
- Water Police
- Public Safety Response Team (PSRT), including the Mobile Response Capability (MRC)
- District Education and Training Office (DETO)
- Police Citizens Youth Club (PCYC)
- Tactical Crime Squad (TCS)
- Rapid Action and Patrol (RAP)
- Polair, relating to helicopters and remote pilotless aircraft, separate to a police airwing which are fixed wing transport aircraft.

== Leadership ==
=== Commissioners ===
The following list chronologically records those who have held the post of Commissioner of the Queensland Police Service.

Photo	Name	Post-nominals	Term began	Term ended	Notes
	David Thompson Seymour		1864	1895	Commissioner Seymour established the detective force in 1864, one of the many reforms he undertook in his thirty-one years as Commissioner. He travelled extensively to the far reaches of the state and brought the concerns of his men to the Government. He was in charge of the Native Police throughout his tenure, a period in which around 40,000 Aboriginal people were estimated to be killed by this force. In 1879, some of these troopers were sent to Victoria to participate in the location of the Kelly gang. On retiring in 1895, Commissioner Seymour had increased police numbers from 275 to 907.
	William Parry-Okeden		1895	1905	Commissioner Parry-Okeden was responsible for many reforms during his ten-year tenure. He reorganised the force into seven districts, initiated the grades of Constable 1/c and Chief Inspector, oversaw the formation of the Criminal Investigation Branch, devised more appropriate country uniforms, introduced the use of police bicycles and established the Fingerprint Bureau.
	William Geoffrey Cahill		1905	1916	Commissioner Cahill supervised a period of expansion and introduced reforms including free uniforms and a better pension scheme, as well as improved arms and ammunition. He established a police horse breeding site and improved training conditions, modernised the Criminal Investigation Branch and pushed for the closer supervision of liquor licensing and gambling.
	Frederic Charles Urquhart		1917	1921	Frederic Urquhart was the first sworn police officer to rise the rank of Commissioner. His tenure was punctuated by the flow-on effects of the First World War and subsequent industrial unrest. He pushed the Government for a closer approximation between police pay and the rates of industrial wages to slow the loss of men to other occupations. He oversaw the establishment of the Border Patrol during the 1919 Influenza Epidemic and was injured during police action against the 'Red Flag' rioters in Brisbane in the same year.
	Patrick Short		1921	1925	Patrick Short was the first native born Queenslander to reach the rank of Commissioner. During his tenure he condensed the number of police districts from twelve to ten and oversaw changes to the 'Police Act' in regard to improving police pensions and family allowances. In 1924 Commissioner Short witnessed legislation which provided a system of appeal against promotions to members of the Queensland Police Union up to and including the rank of Senior Sergeant.
	William Harold Ryan		1925	1934	Commissioner Ryan's tenure included a push for pay increases for all police officers. He established night duty bicycle patrols in the Metropolitan District and bought two motorised prison vans to replace the horse drawn 'Black Maria'. In 1931 Mr Ryan sanctioned the recruitment of the first two policewomen. He embraced motorisation of the force and at the end of his tenure there were thirteen motorcycles and three vehicles available for use across the state.
	Cecil James Carroll	MVO, MC	1934	1949	Commissioner Carroll introduced many reforms including qualifying examinations for promotion, an improved training system for recruits and a new Cadet system of admission. He approved the extensive renovation of police buildings and the opening of the Queensland Police Garage and the Police Welfare Club. Mr Carroll oversaw the establishment of a wireless radio station, the installation of radio receivers in police cars, the introduction of the 'modus operandi' recording system, the single fingerprint system, the Scientific Section and the Traffic Squad.
	John Smith	LVO	1949	1954	Commissioner Smith oversaw the creation of the position of Deputy Commissioner and on 29 November 1951 appointed Chief Inspector Glynn as the state's first Deputy Commissioner. He represented Australia at the general assembly of the International Criminal Police Commission in Norway in 1953 and the arrangements for the visit of Her Majesty, the Queen, and the Duke of Edinburgh in 1954.
	Patrick Glynn		1955	1957	Before Glynn became Commissioner his commitment to the Queensland Police was evident in suggestions made to improve operations of the Criminal Investigation Branch. Improvements to zoning, wireless patrol, and 'murder bags' (equipment used to secure evidence) were considered, with continued development on these aspects taking place today. Glynn also organised and took charge of a 'Detective College' for the specific training of Detectives during his tenure.
	Thomas William Harrold		1957	1957	Prior to taking on the role of Commissioner, Mr Harold headed up the Crime Investigation Branch. During World War II he was in charge of the Metropolitan Air Raids Precaution and later directed security for Queensland's hosting of the Royal Tour in 1954. Commissioner Harold, as President of the Queensland Police-Citizens Youth Welfare Association, worked energetically for the advancement of the association. On retirement he continued to serve as Director of the QPCYWA until his death in 1961.
	Frank Bischof	LVO, QPM	1958	1969	Commissioner Bischof appeared frequently at public functions throughout the countryside, encouraging the community to support and co-operate with police activities. He became well known for his interest in the welfare of children, particularly through the expansion of youth clubs, which led to him being named Queensland's first 'Father of the Year' in 1959, although he was childless. Mr Bischof was responsible for the formation of the Queensland Police Pipe Band in 1958, established the Police Public Relations Bureau in 1959, the Warrant Bureau in 1963 and the Crime Prevention Bureau in 1968.
	Norm Bauer	LVO, QPM	1969	1970	Commissioner Bauer's began his administration in the middle of the political and public debate about the random use of breathalysers, with the Government being accused of using the police simply as revenue collectors. Bauer took up the request of Callaghan, the Police Union secretary, for an extra 400 police so that Queensland's size, distances and dispersal of population could be adequately serviced. In 1970, Bauer oversaw the purchase of land at Chelmer and the development of the Queensland Police College for in-service training.
	Ray Whitrod	CVO, QPM	1970	1976	Commissioner Whitrod called for a greater professionalisation and modernisation of the Force and for promotion based on merit, not seniority and a preference for policemen with higher educational standards. During his tenure as Commissioner he was responsible for the formation of the Crime Intelligence Unit, the Police Air Wing becoming operational, the commencement of construction of a new Police Headquarters building in Makerston Street, and the commencement of construction of the Driver Training Wing at Mt Cotton.
	Sir Terence Murray Lewis	OBE, GM, QPM	1976	1987	During his tenure, Commissioner Terry Lewis was responsible for opening the Police Museum to the public, the overhaul and expansion of the training regime that included the introduction of the new eighteen month Cadet training course. On 21 September 1987 he was stood down on full pay by the then Police Minister Bill Gunn and Premier Joh Bjelke-Petersen. On 19 April 1989, by virtue of the Commissioner of Police (Vacation of Office) Act, the office of Commissioner of Police was declared vacant and from that date the Commissioner of Police (then Sir Terence Murray Lewis) ceased to be a member of the Police Force. In 1991 Mr Lewis was convicted on fifteen counts of corruption and one count of forgery and was sentenced to a total of twenty-five years in prison. Lewis was subsequently stripped of his knighthood, OBE and QPM in 1993.
	Ron Redmond	APM, QPM	1987	1989	Deputy Commissioner Redmond took over as Acting Commissioner after the Police Minister directed Terry Lewis to step down as Police Commissioner on 21 September 1987. Redmond guided the destiny of the Queensland Police through two of the most turbulent years in its history.
	Noel Newnham	APM	1989	1992	Commissioner Newnham was contracted as recommended by corruption commissioner Mr Tony Fitzgerald QC, to enact the Fitzgerald Inquiry recommendations. Mr Newnham advocated community policing and decentralisation of the Service. Under this model the headquarters echelon determined and disseminated values, policy, principles and broad objectives that gave regional commanders a greater deal of discretion in deciding on particular programs suited to their geographical area. Mr Newnham oversaw the appointment of the first female commissioned officers, the creation of Queensland Crime Stoppers Unit in 1989 and implemented a new two year Police Recruit Program and professional development program for the entire Service in 1990.
	Jim O'Sullivan	APM	1992	2000	Commissioner O'Sullivan's substantial record of achievement had a far reaching impact on the policy and operational direction of policing in Queensland. Mr O'Sullivan oversaw the introduction of the 'Police Beat Project' piloted in Toowoomba in 1993. He launched the 'Identify It' property marking project in 1995. Mr O'Sullivan believed public confidence could be achieved by directing more resources towards operational policing needs and by improving the professional image through developing professional policing competencies.
	Bob Atkinson	APM	2000	2012	In 2002 Commissioner Atkinson presided over security arrangements and the successful hosting of the Commonwealth Heads of Government Meeting in Coolum. He continually focused on community safety and providing a professional police service to protect the people of Queensland and their property. Atkinson is credited with reducing both the crime rate and road toll during his tenure.
	Ian Stewart	APM	2012	2019	
	Katarina Carroll	APM	2019	2024	Carroll resigned on Friday 1 March 2024, before her contract was due.
	Steve Gollschewski	APM	2024	2026	Appointed acting commissioner in March 2024 until a new commissioner was selected, he was appointed to the role on Monday 22 April 2024. In February 2025, Gollschewski went on indefinite leave due to a cancer diagnosis. He returned on 15 September 2025. Gollschewski resigned on Friday, 20 February 2026, for family and health reasons.
	Brett Pointing	APM	2026		Appointed an interim commissioner for twelve months, from Saturday 21 February 2026. Pointing was one of the authors of the recently-released "100-day review" into the Service.

=== Chief officers ===
Period	Name	Notes
Chief Officer, Queensland State Emergency Service
5 February 2024–c. 12 July 2026	Mark Armstrong	First-ever appointed Chief Officer of the State Emergency Service. He was formerly a colonel in the Australian Army.
Chief Officer, Marine Rescue Queensland
19 February 2024	Tony Wulff	First ever appointed Chief Officer of the newly-formed Marine Rescue Queensland.

== Equipment ==
Standard equipment issued and worn on duty belt or load-bearing vest by a uniformed police officer:

- Glock 22 pistol .40-calibre, with three magazines (45 rounds of ammunition)
- Extendable baton (21 inches (530 mm)) concealed within pouch
- Lithgow Arms SAF-LOK Mark 5 hinged handcuffs
- Motorola APX 8000 radio and radio pouch
- OC (oleoresin capsicum) spray within pouch
- Axon TASERs (X26, TASER 10)
- Axon Body 2, Flex 2, Body 3 body worn cameras (BWC)
- Apple iPads and iPhones to access the operational computer QPRIME, given the name 'QLiTE'.
- Load bearing vest

Officers, if necessary, can access the Remington Patrolman R4 carbine service rifle if qualified.

Supplier of belt and pouches is TripleB Leathercraft and Tote Systems.

Other equipment provided to officers include:

- Maglite
- Lightweight medic gloves and voice recording devices

An equipment vest was created called the general accoutrement vest (GAV) which proved extremely unpopular and rarely used by officers, and in the 2010s was replaced by the load bearing vest (LBV) which is worn by most operational officers. The LBV was designed to transfer the weight from the hips to the torso, and held the radio, handcuffs and OC spray. In early 2023, an integrated load-bearing vest (ILBV) was being rolled out to replace the LBV, and included an overt ballistic vest into one vest, designed to increase officer safety, as well as visibility.

Body-worn video technology was introduced following a trial in 2015. The TASER 10 was introduced in 2024.

== Fleet ==
In the 1980s to 2010s, the Holden Commodore, Ford Falcon and Toyota Aurion made up most of the fleet of both general duties and highway patrol operations. In more recent years the ceasing of Australian-produced models has meant overseas alternatives. The Hyundai Sonata have been used as general duties vehicles, while the Subaru Levorg and Kia Stinger have been employed for use as highway patrol vehicles. Hyundai iLoads and modified Toyota Hiluxes are used as prisoner transport vehicles, or commonly referred to as "paddy wagons".

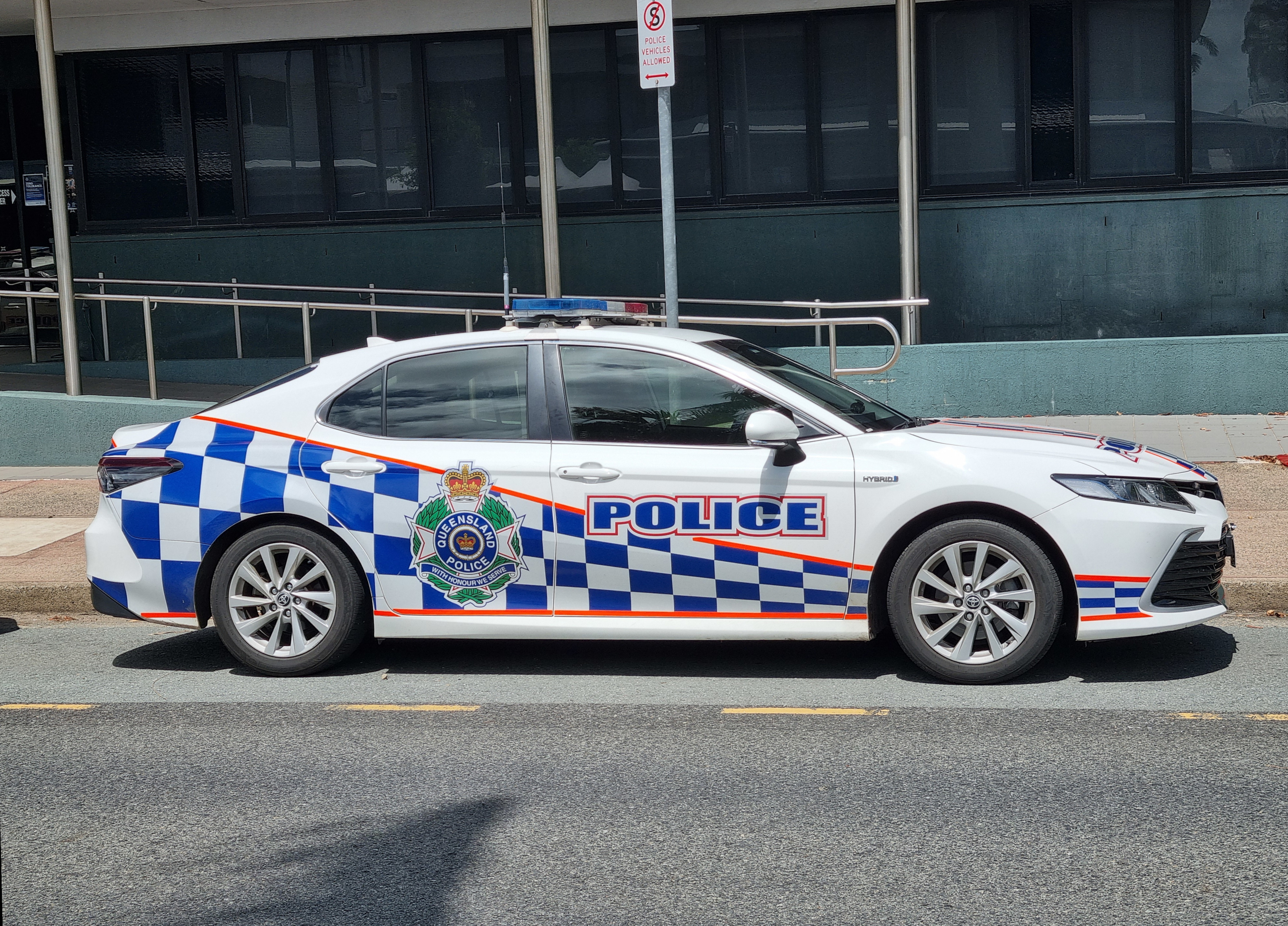
Toyota Camry sedan

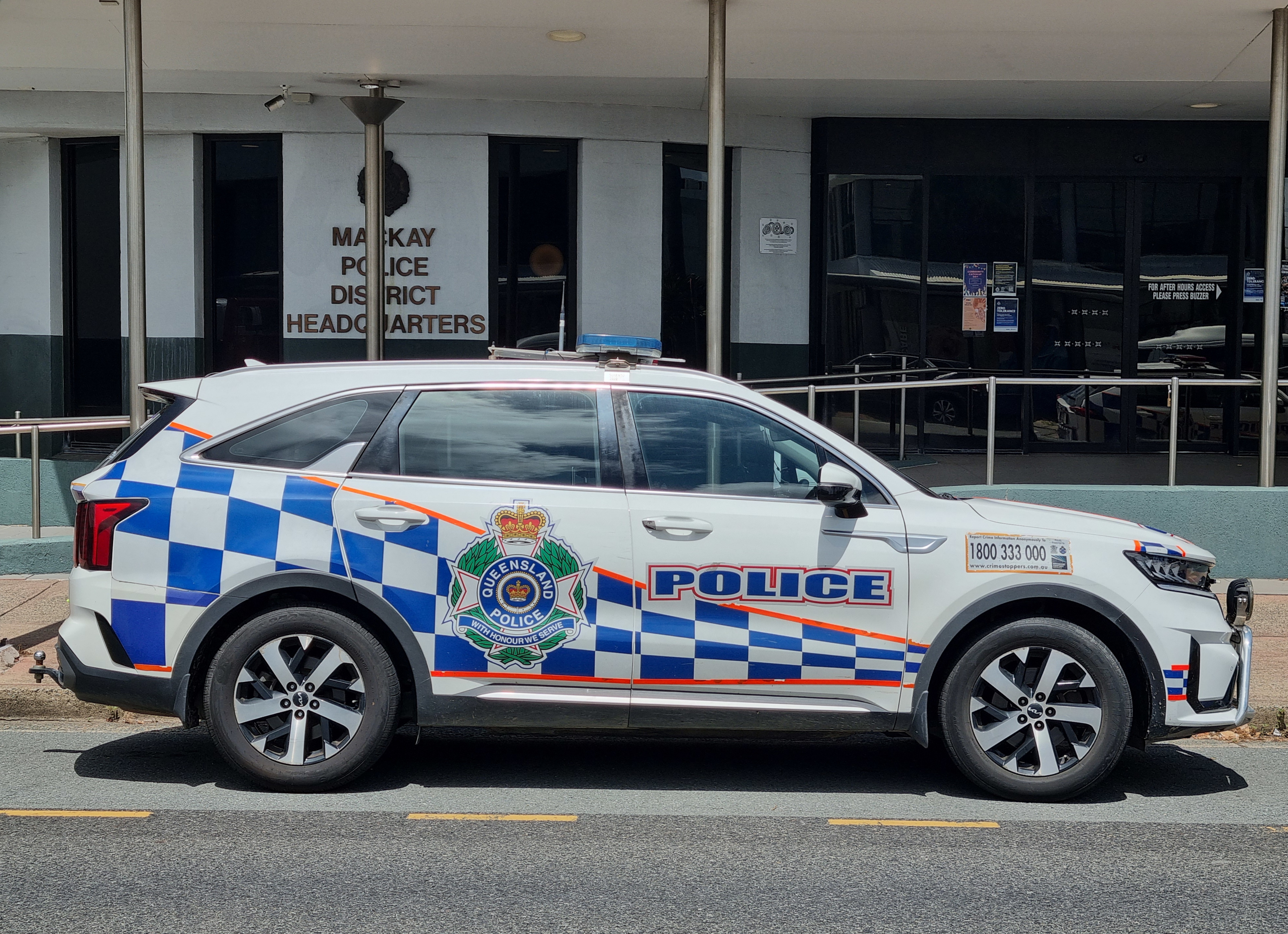
Kia Sorento AWD

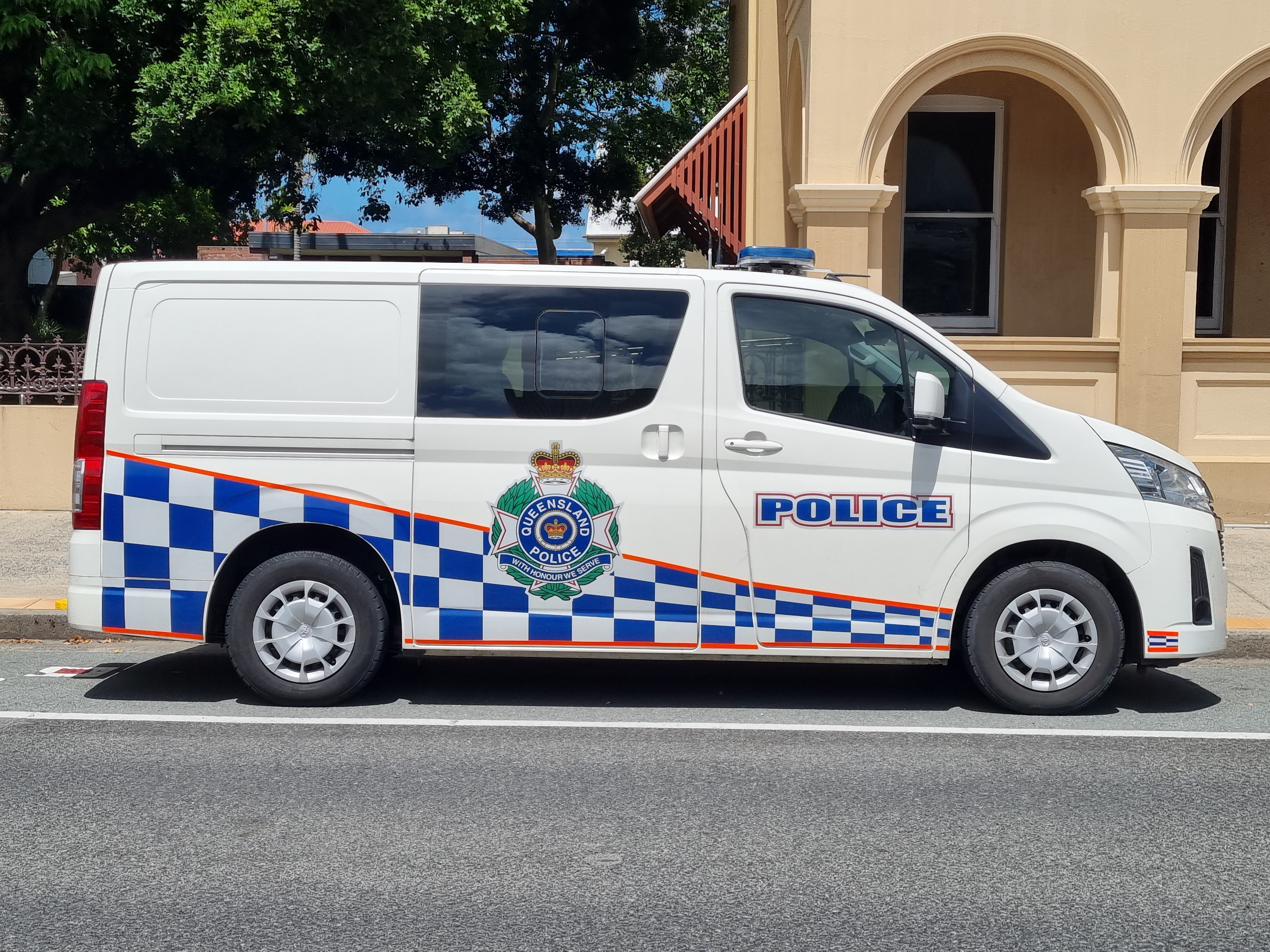
Toyota Hiace van

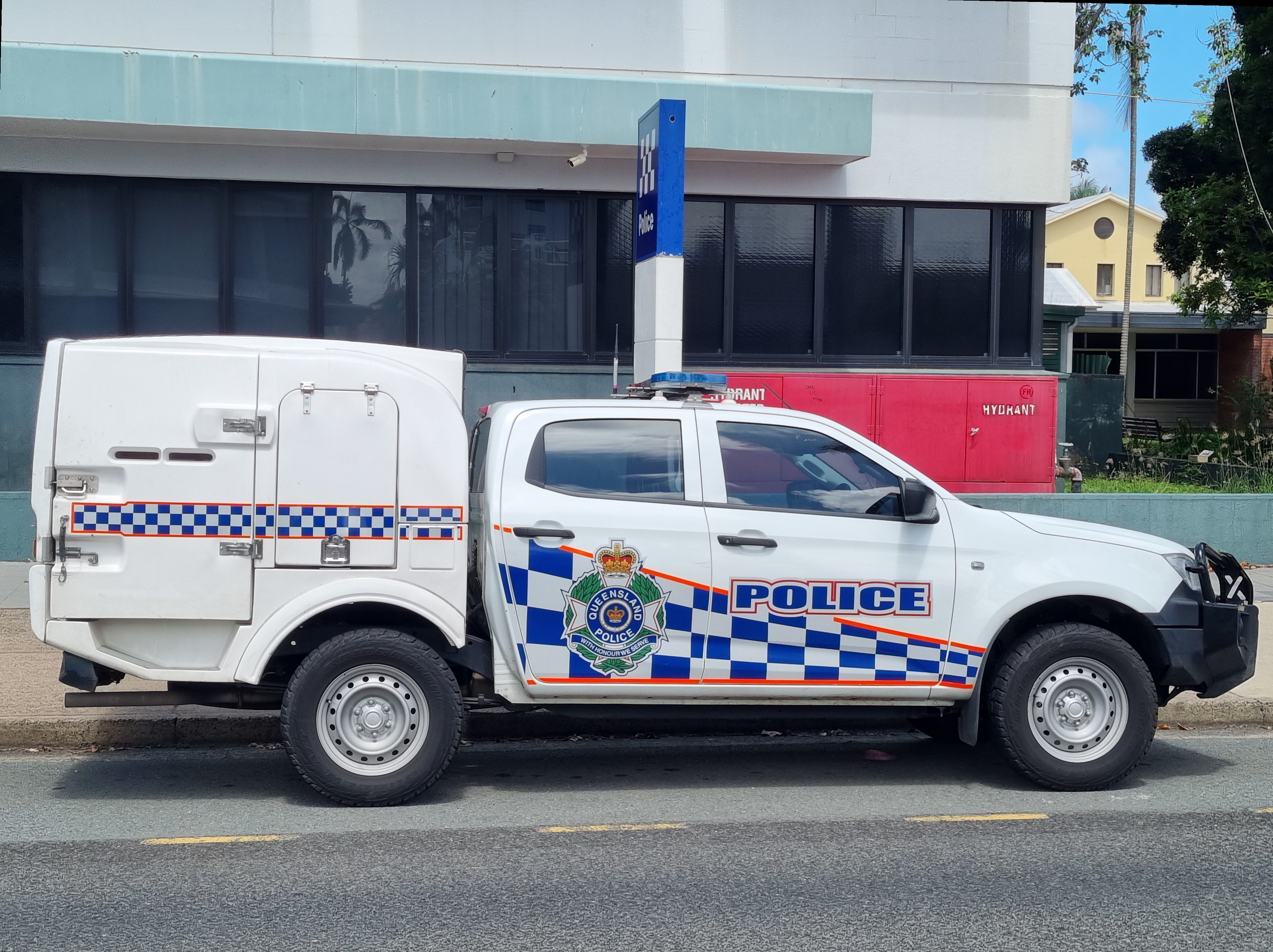
Isuzu D-MAX dual cab, with prisoner pod

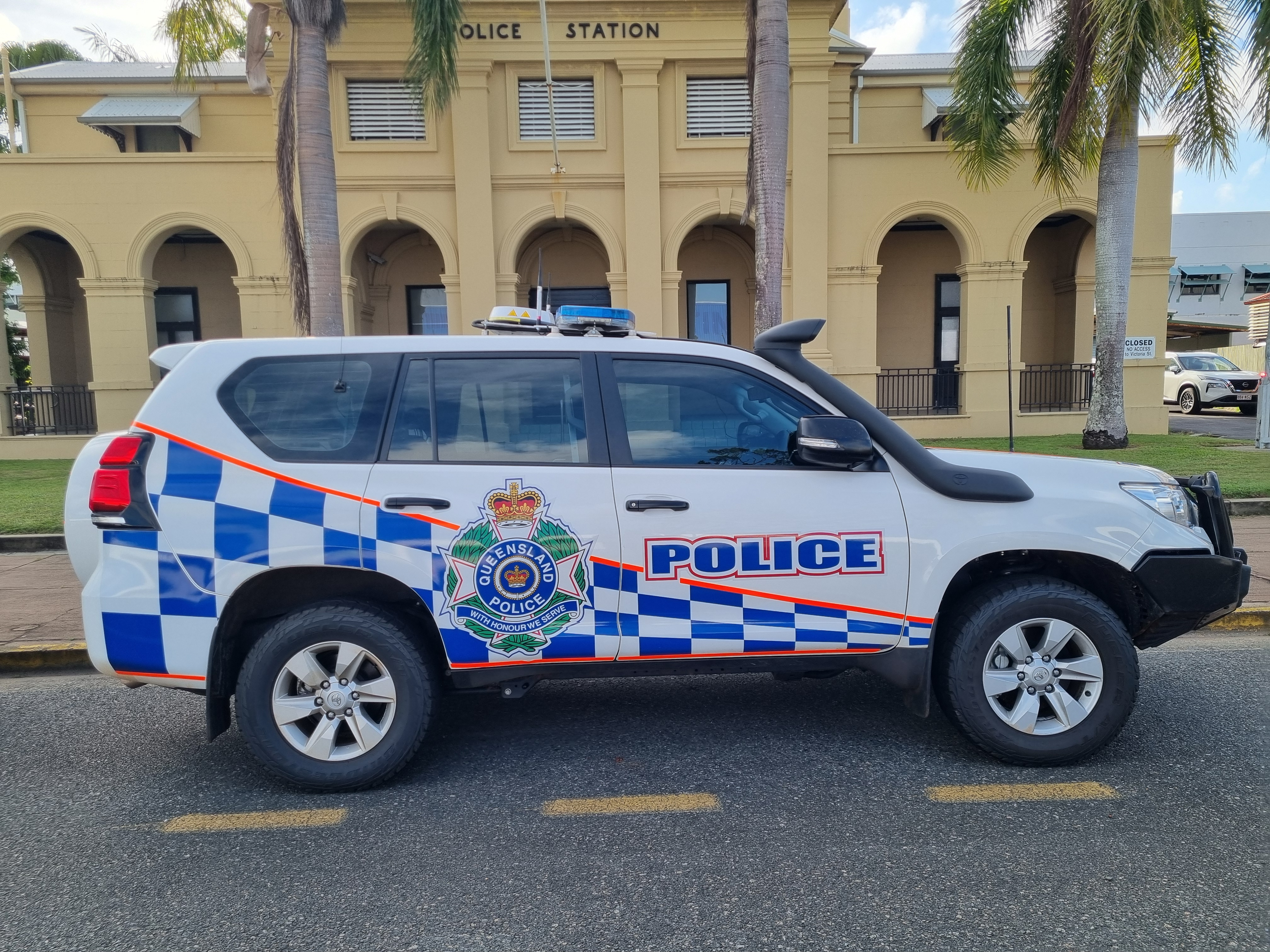
Toyota Land Cruiser station wagon 4WD

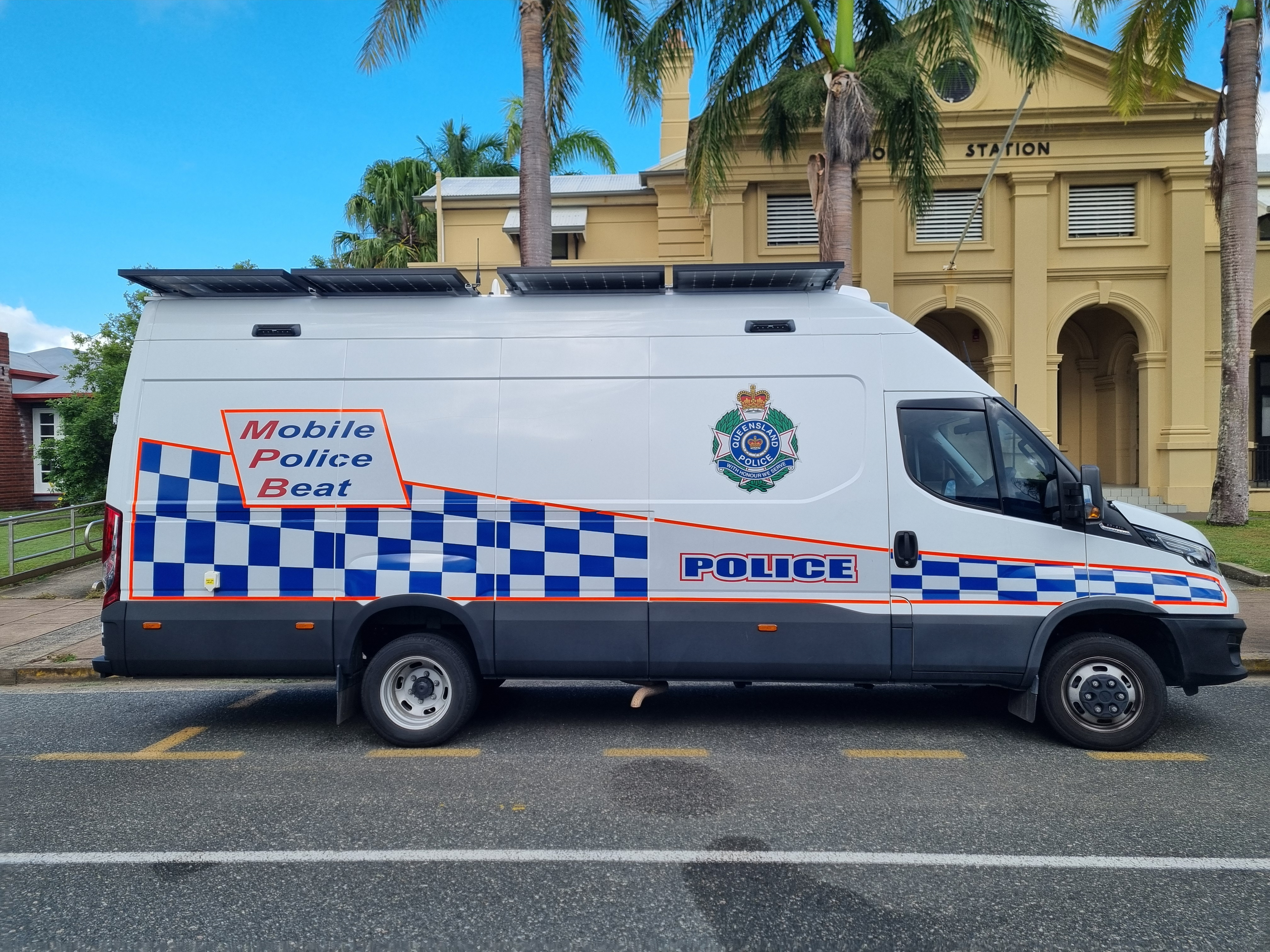
Iveco Daily van as a small police station

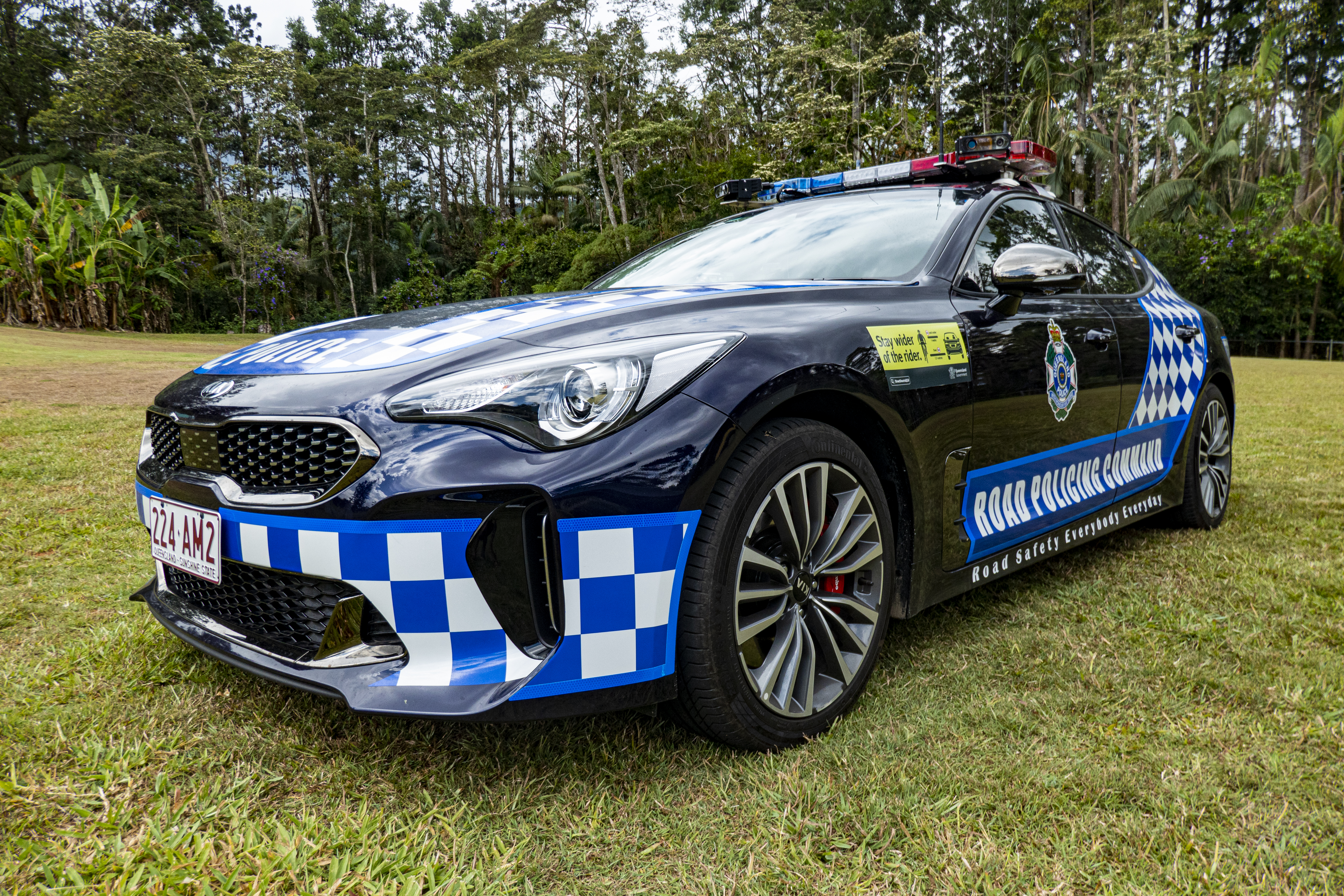
Kia Stinger Highway Patrol

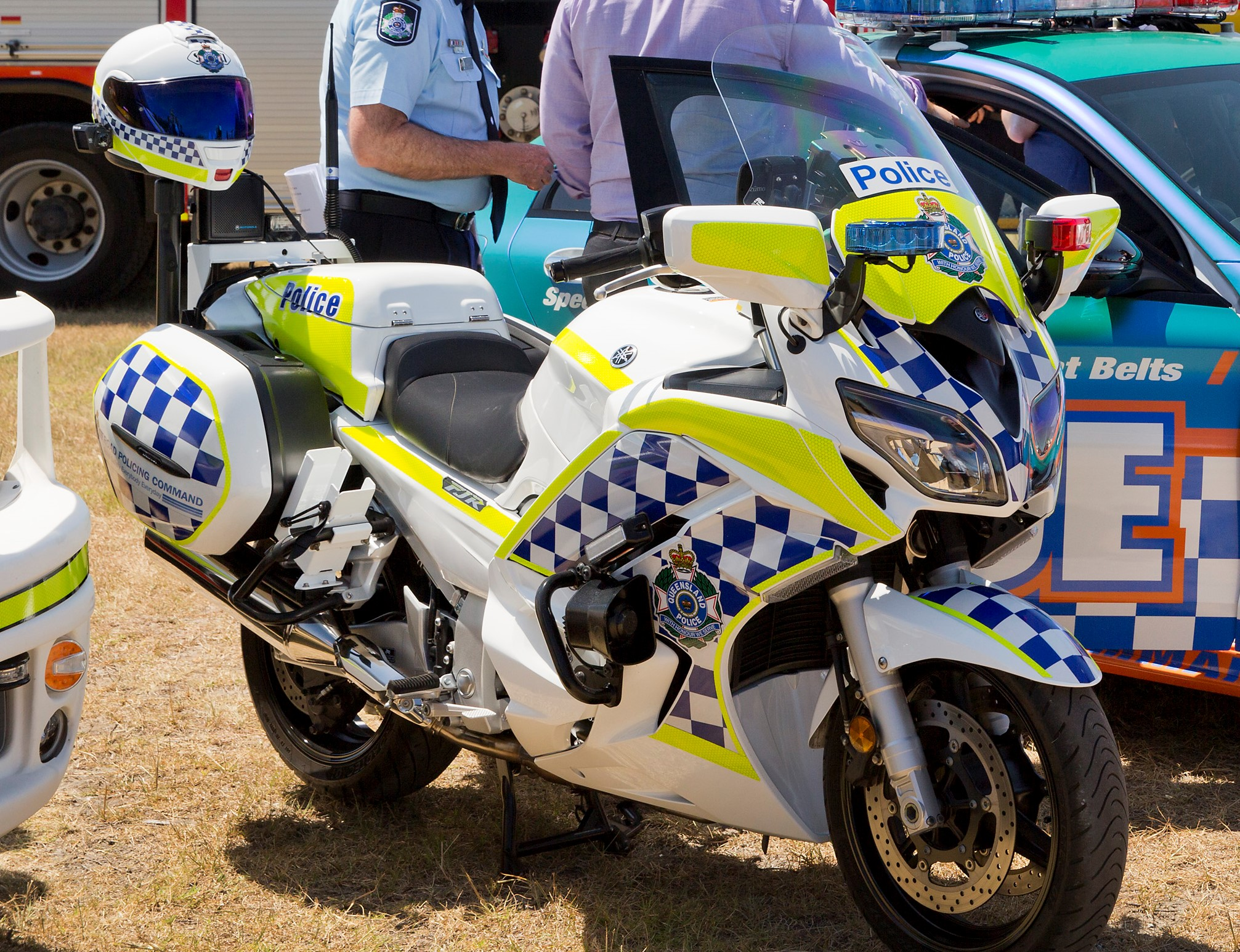
Yamaha FJR1300

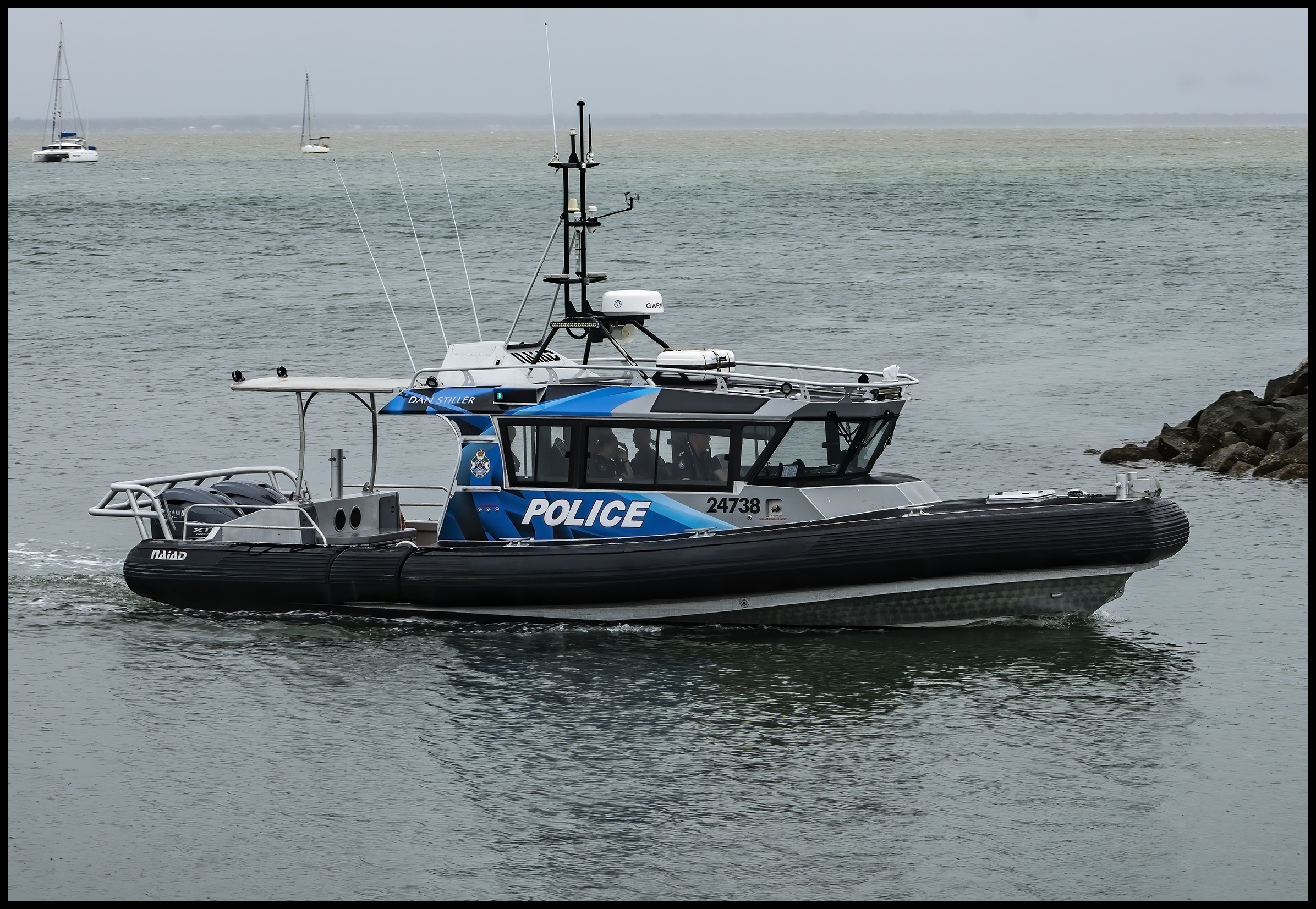
Queensland Police patrol boat

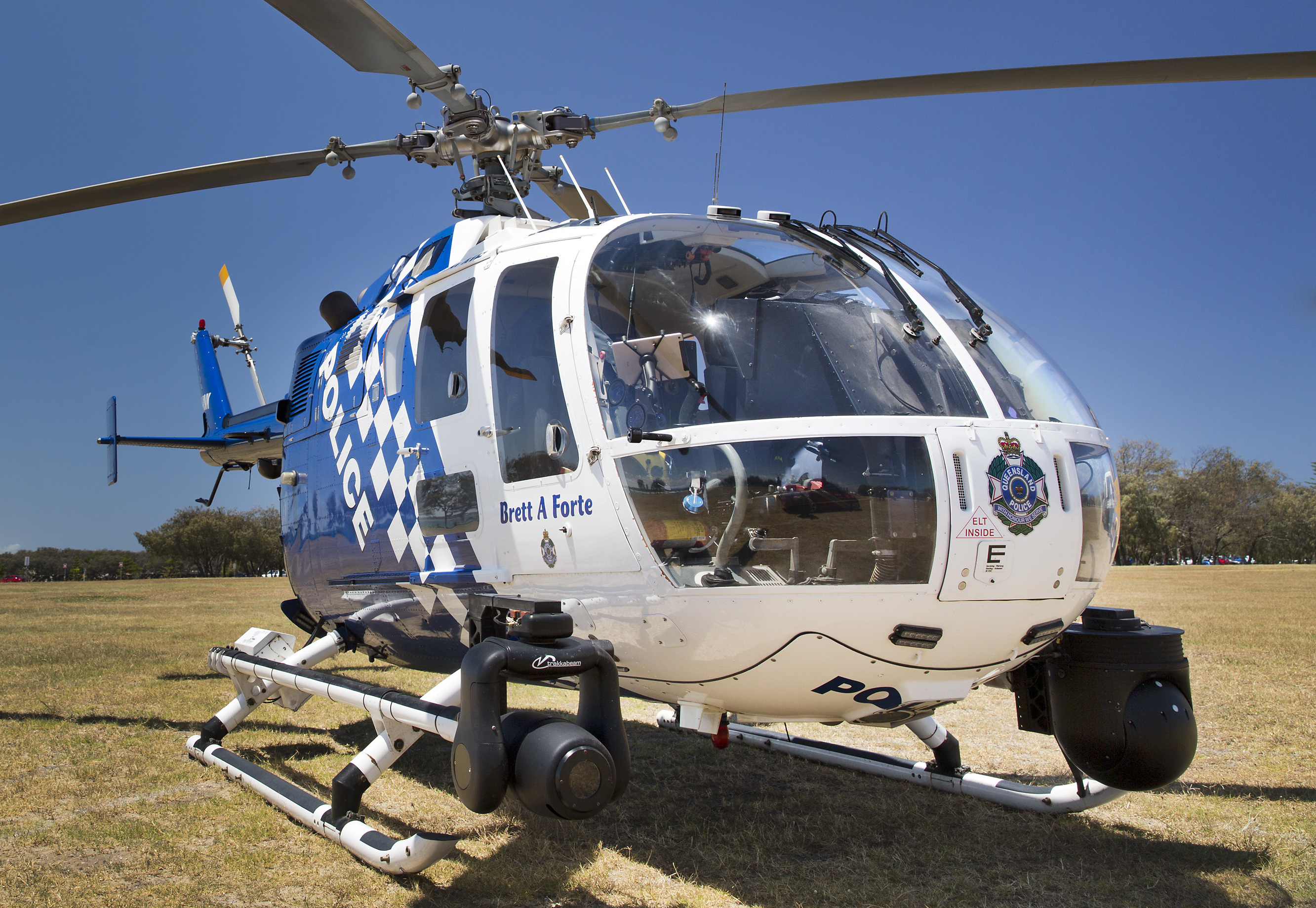
Polair 2

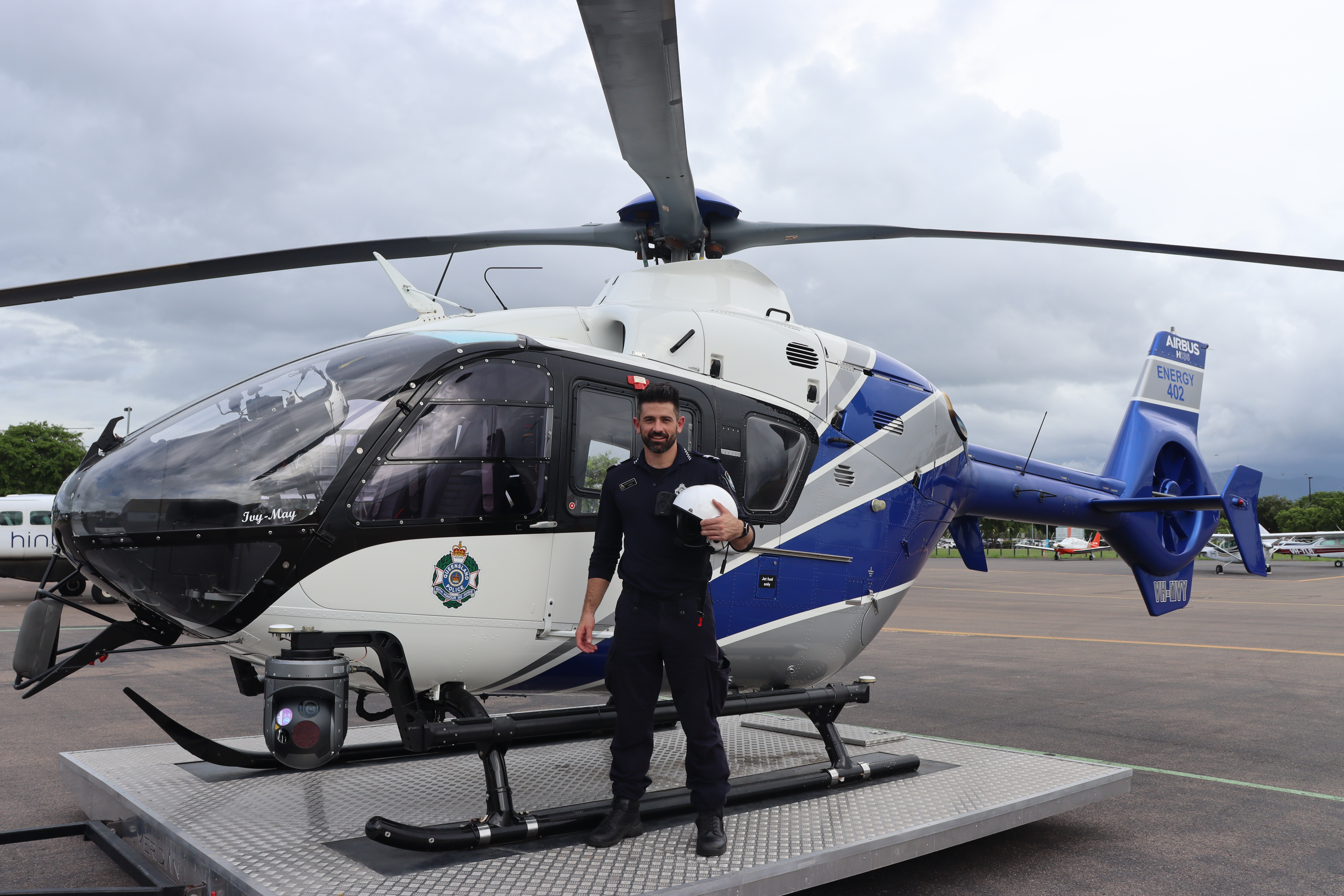
Polair Townsville

The Toyota Camry Hybrid and Kia Sorento Hybrid has become the primary general duties vehicles in metropolitan areas, replacing the remaining Holden Commodores, as well as older Hyundai Sonatas. Queensland Police aims to have a 100% hybrid sedans and SUV fleet by 2025.

In 2023, US-built pickup trucks have been spotted in service, with vehicles such as the Chevrolet Silverado being utilised by the Mounted Unit.

The SERT (Special Emergency Response Team) unit also has two specialised armoured vehicles, Lenco BearCats, at its disposal for use in riot control and other potentially dangerous situations throughout the Brisbane/South Eastern and northern police regions, with one vehicle stationed in Brisbane and Cairns each. Additionally, the EORT (Explosive Ordnance Response Team) in 2017 purchased a Lenco BombCat, a bigger and stronger vehicle based on a BearCat.

From 1996 to 2015, nominated vehicles were fitted with other 200 in-car computers supplied by the state transport department, the Mobile Integrated Network Data Access (MINDA) units. From April 2012, automatic number plate recognition technology was fitted to road policing unit vehicles, follow earlier trials.

Queensland Police has received its first police helicopter, based on the Gold Coast in 2012. The helicopter was used for a six-month trial period. The highly anticipated $1.6 million Bell 206 Long Ranger has already been hailed a success, assisting police in 24 different dispatches in its first three days of operation, and will be used extensively during major events such as Schoolies Week and the Gold Coast 600. The helicopter is fitted out with state-of-the-art equipment such as infrared and thermal imaging cameras, and other equipment based on the NSW Police Force helicopters. A second helicopter a BO 105 was introduced by July 2014 in time for the G20 summit in November, responsible for patrolling Brisbane and the Sunshine Coast. The helicopters have Forward Looking Infrared (FLIR) and Searchlight (TRAKKA beam) capabilities. In January 2024 the Queensland Government announced the arrival of a third helicopter allocated to the Far North, to be based in Townsville, alongside a AUD$13 million roll-out of digitally encrypted radios in the region. This new air capability consisted of a leased Airbus EC135T2 while a permanent system was procured.

In a first for an Australian police department, Queensland Police have purchased numerous unmanned aerial vehicles (UAVs, also known as 'drones') which have already been used for surveillance purposes in numerous situations where sending in officers is deemed too risky such as during sieges or hostage rescue operations. They can also be used to aerially examine crime scenes.

Queensland Water Police operate three purpose-designed 23 metres (75 ft) patrol vessels and numerous smaller rigid-hulled inflatable boats.

== Officers killed in the line of duty ==
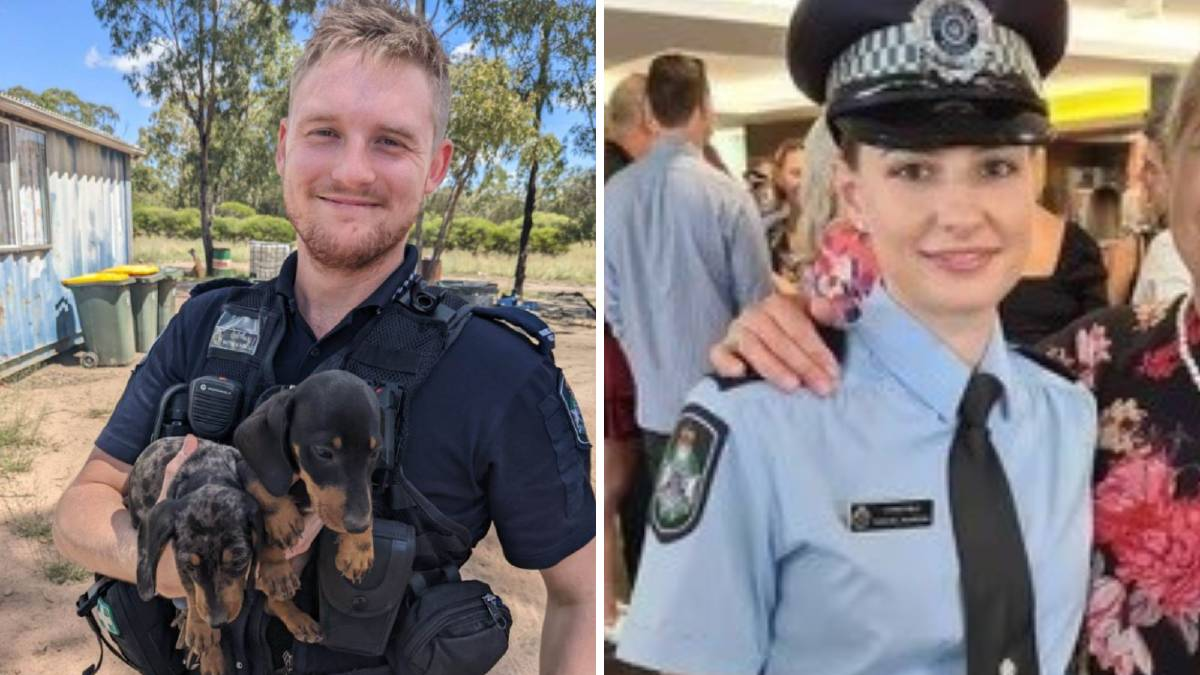
Constable Matthew Arnold and Constable Rachel McCrow, police officers killed on duty at Wieambilla, Queensland on 12 December 2022

- 12 December 2022: Constables Matthew Arnold and Rachel McCrow were killed in a shooting ambush in Wieambilla, near Dalby, southern Queensland. A neighbour was also killed, and two other officers injured.
- 26 June 2021: Senior Constable David Masters, 53, was struck and killed by a stolen vehicle on the Bruce Highway in Burpengary, north of Brisbane.
- 29 May 2017: Senior Constable Brett Forte was shot and killed at Adare, north of Gatton, after attempting to apprehend a suspected offender. The gunman, Rick Maddison, was shot and killed the next day by police while trying to escape after a siege in a farmhouse at Ringwood, north-west of Gatton. On 8 June 2018, the police helicopter Polair 2 was named Brett A. Forte in his honour. Polair 2 had provided air support during the siege.
- 29 May 2011: Detective Senior Constable Damien Leeding (CIB) was shot when he confronted an armed offender at the Pacific Pines Tavern on the Gold Coast. Leeding died in hospital on 1 June three days after being shot.
- 1 December 2010: Sergeant Daniel Stiller, 33, was killed when his motorcycle collided with a jack-knifing truck on the Bruce Highway while on 'wide load' escort duty.
- 18 July 2007: Constable Brett Irwin, 33, was shot while executing an arrest warrant for breach of bail at Keperra, in northwest Brisbane.
- 22 August 2003: Senior Sergeant Perry Irwin, 42, was shot while investigating reports of gunfire in bushland at Caboolture, north of Brisbane.
- 21 July 2000: Senior Constable Norman Watt, 33, was shot during an armed stand-off at Alton Downs near Rockhampton, Central Queensland.
- 21 May 1996: Constable Shayne Gill, Struck by a motor vehicle while on radar duty on the Bruce Highway near Glasshouse Mountains.
- 29 June 1989: Constable Brett Handran was shot attending a domestic dispute in Wynnum, in east Brisbane.
- 29 July 1987: Senior Constable Peter Kidd was shot in a raid at Virginia, in north Brisbane.
- 29 February 1984: Constable Michael Low was shot attending a domestic dispute at North Rockhampton, central Queensland.
- 2 November 1975: Senior Constable Lyle Hoey was deliberately run down by a car near Mount Molloy in North Queensland.
- 9 April 1969: Senior Constable Colin Brown was shot while investigating the behaviour of a farm employee on a property near Dayboro, north of Brisbane.
- 27 March 1968: Constable Douglas Gordon was shot attending a domestic disturbance at Inala, in south Brisbane.
- 26 October 1964: Senior Constable Desmond Trannore was shot attending a domestic disturbance near Gordonvale, North Queensland.
- 14 February 1963: Senior Constable Cecil Bagley was electrocuted when he tried to rescue a neighbour being electrocuted in his car at Mount Gravatt, south Brisbane. Although at home, his death was deemed to have occurred while on duty because, as a police officer, he was always expected to respond in an emergency situation.
- 16 August 1962: Constable Douglas Wrembeck stopped to question a motorist in South Brisbane and was killed when he was struck by a car driven by a hit-and-run driver.
- 19 February 1962: Constable Gregory Olive was shot in the chest at close range when he knocked on a front door to make inquiries at Kelvin Grove, Brisbane.
- 1 April 1956: Constable First Class Roy Doyle died in hospital at Mackay from head injuries sustained when he hit a submerged block of concrete while attempting a rescue in the flooded Pioneer River at Mackay on 29 March 1956.
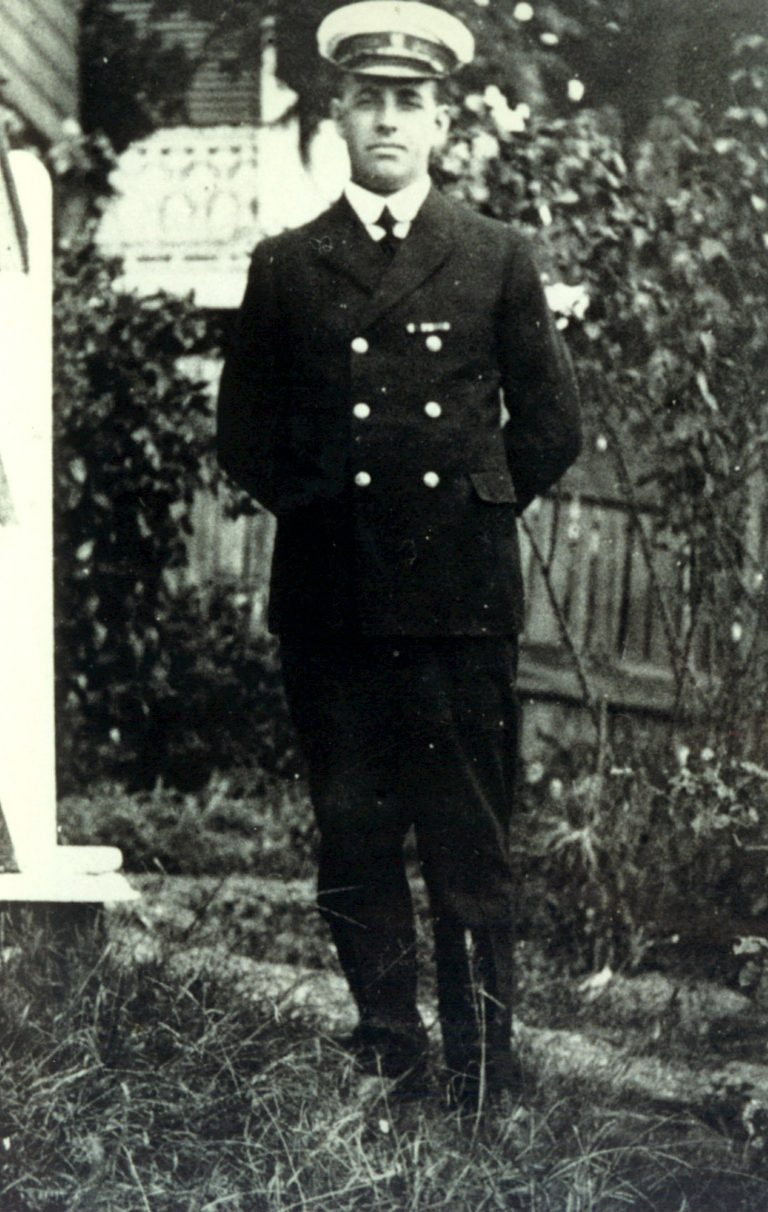
- Constable George Robert Young in his water police uniform circa 1922; Young died searching for a missing woman in 1938
  28 November 1938: Constable George Robert Young of the water police was one of four men on a RAAF amphibious aircraft which crashed killing all on board. They were searching for the body of missing woman Marjorie Norval in the estuaries of Moreton Bay when the aircraft hit high tension wires.
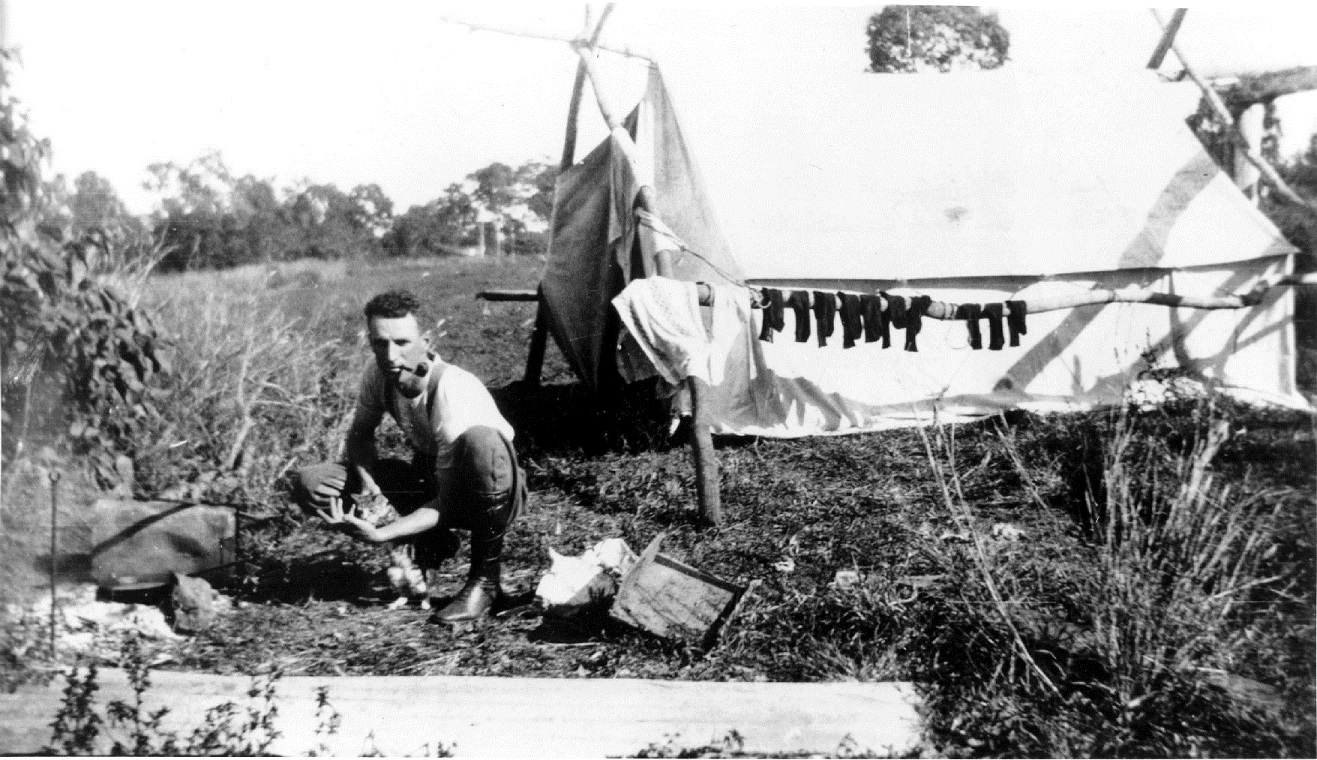
- Constable Ernest Dawson playing with a cat at a camp near Ayr, circa 1930
  6 August 1930: Constable Ernest James Dawson was on traffic duty on the Yungaburra Road near Lake Barrine when he lost control of his motorcycle. Despite emergency surgery which appeared initially successful, complications arose and he died in Brisbane General Hospital on 18 January 1931.
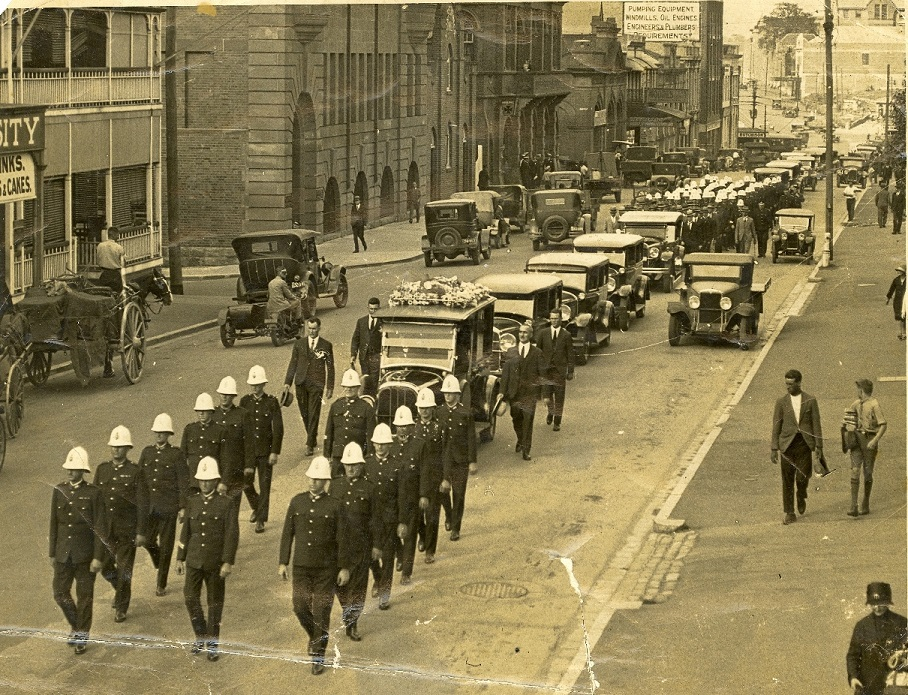
  The funeral procession for Constable Ernest Dawson, Ann Street, Brisbane, 19 January 1931
- 27 September 1906: Sergeant Thomas Heaney died at South Brisbane from head fractures sustained when he was hit multiple times over the head with a metal bar during an arrest on 7 June 1905 at Woolloongabba, Brisbane.
- 23 December 1905: Constable Albert Price was stabbed while making an arrest at Mackay.
- 16 September 1904: Constable First Class Charles O'Kearney was knocked down by a horse being deliberately ridden towards him in retaliation for an arrest in Laidley.
- 29 March 1903: Acting Sergeant David Johnston was killed by being hit on the head with an axe by a prisoner in the watchhouse at Mackay.
- 30 March 1902: Constable George Doyle was shot while attempting to capture the Kenniff brothers, who had a long history of stealing cattle and horses, in Upper Warrego.
- 2 July 1895: Senior Constable William Conroy was stabbed several times trying to prevent a man from stabbing the man's wife on Thursday Island.
- 6 September 1894: Constable Edward Lanigan was shot in the chest while trying to prevent another policeman from being shot during an arrest at Montalbion (a mining town near Irvinebank).
- 10 May 1894: Constable Benjamin Ebbitt died at South Brisbane having never recovered from an assault during an arrest on 9 November 1890 at Croydon.
- 4 February 1893: Constable James Sangster, 25, drowned while attempting a rescue of two members of the Jackson family during the 1893 flood of the Bremer River at North Ipswich. He is commemorated by the James Sangster Memorial at North Ipswich, which was initiated by the Jackson family and funded by public subscription.
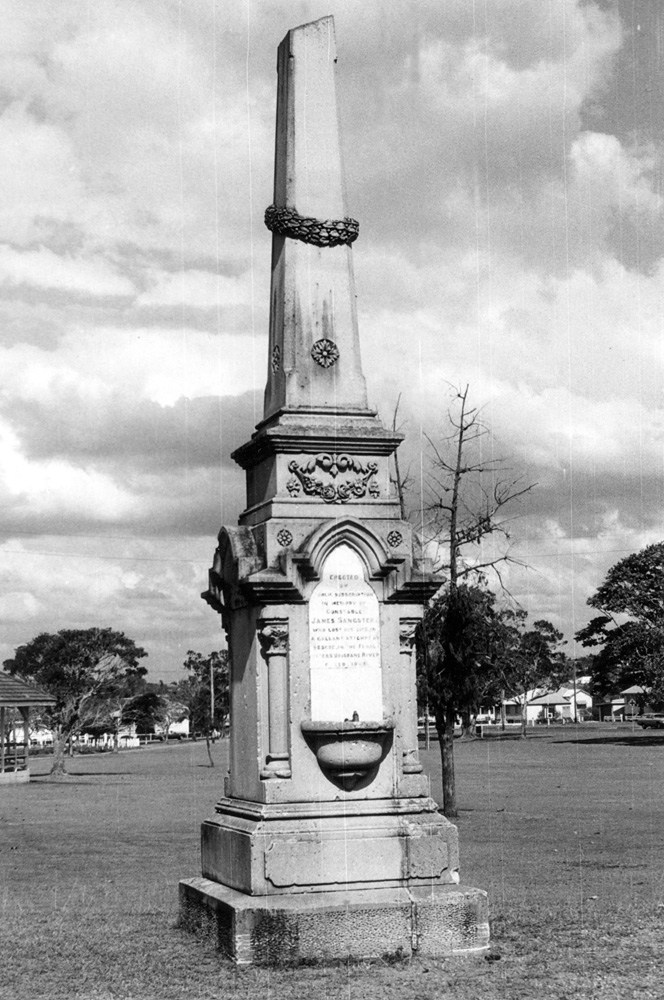
  James Sangster Memorial, circa 1940
- 27 October 1889: Senior Constable Alfred Wavell was shot at Corinda (southwest of Burketown) by a man who had escaped from the Normanton lock-up.
- 26 January 1883: Constable William Dwyer was struck on the head by a tomahawk by an Aboriginal near Juandah Station via Taroom.
- 24 January 1883: Cadet Sub-Inspector Mark Beresford was speared in the thigh and hit on the head by Aboriginals in the Selwyn Ranges to the south of Cloncurry.
- 24 September 1881: Sub-Inspector Henry Kaye was speared through the chest by Aboriginals at Woolgar gold fields (100 km north of Richmond).
- 24 January 1881: Sub-Inspector George Dyas was found buried after being speared in the back by Aboriginals while he camped near the 40 Mile Waterhole near Normanton.
- 6 November 1867: Constable Patrick Cahill and Constable John Power were poisoned and shot in the head at the Mackenzie River Crossing while escorting a consignment of bank notes and bullion from Rockhampton to Clermont.

== See also ==
- Crime in Brisbane
- Crime in Australia
- Lucas Inquiry
- Queensland Council for Civil Liberties
- History of the Queensland Police
