= Pinkenba Six =

Queensland, Australia police officers accused of misconduct

The Pinkenba Six is a group of Queensland police officers accused of the abduction of three Aboriginal boys in May 1994. Each of the six (Kelly Hanlen, Anthony Venardos, Barry Donelly, Matthew Johnson, Mark Ellis, Mark Henderson) were charged with three counts of deprivation of liberty. The six were not jailed and the charges were dropped.

== Incident ==
The three boys, aged 12, 13, and 14, were ordered into a police car by the six officers in the neighbourhood of Fortitude Valley in the inner city suburbs of Brisbane, Queensland. Each boy was driven in a separate patrol car to a swampy industrial area in Pinkenba at 4 a.m. The officers threatened to throw the boys into the swampy area, and referred to a place where people's fingers were cut off, in order to get them to comply with their demands. The boys were abandoned after their shoes were removed. The boys later retrieved their shoes and began to walk home. They finished the journey in a taxi paid for by a security guard they met along the way.

== Outcome ==
Police later admitted that the boys had not previously committed any crimes but were taken to deter them from committing any crimes or being a public nuisance.

Following an investigation by the Criminal Justice Commission, the Public Prosecutor laid charges against the police for deprivation of liberty. The charges were later dropped after a magistrate found the boys agreed to go with the police officers. The officers were put on probation for one year by the police service, not as a court sentence.

The decision drew criticism from many members of the community, the Aboriginal Legal Service (NSW/ACT), and the Queensland Council for Civil Liberties. The case has been cited as an example of "the cultural and linguistic disadvantages faced by Aboriginal children in the courtroom in both the way that evidence is taken from them, and the way in which it is interpreted."

One of the Pinkenba Six was Mark Ellis, who was a One Nation candidate in Queensland until his withdrawal in 2017.

== Bibliography ==
- Prenzler, Tim. Police Corruption: Preventing Misconduct and Maintaining Integrity. Boca Raton, Florida: CRC, 2009. Print.
