= Iván Szelényi =

Hungarian-American sociologist (1938–2026)

- Szelényi Iván
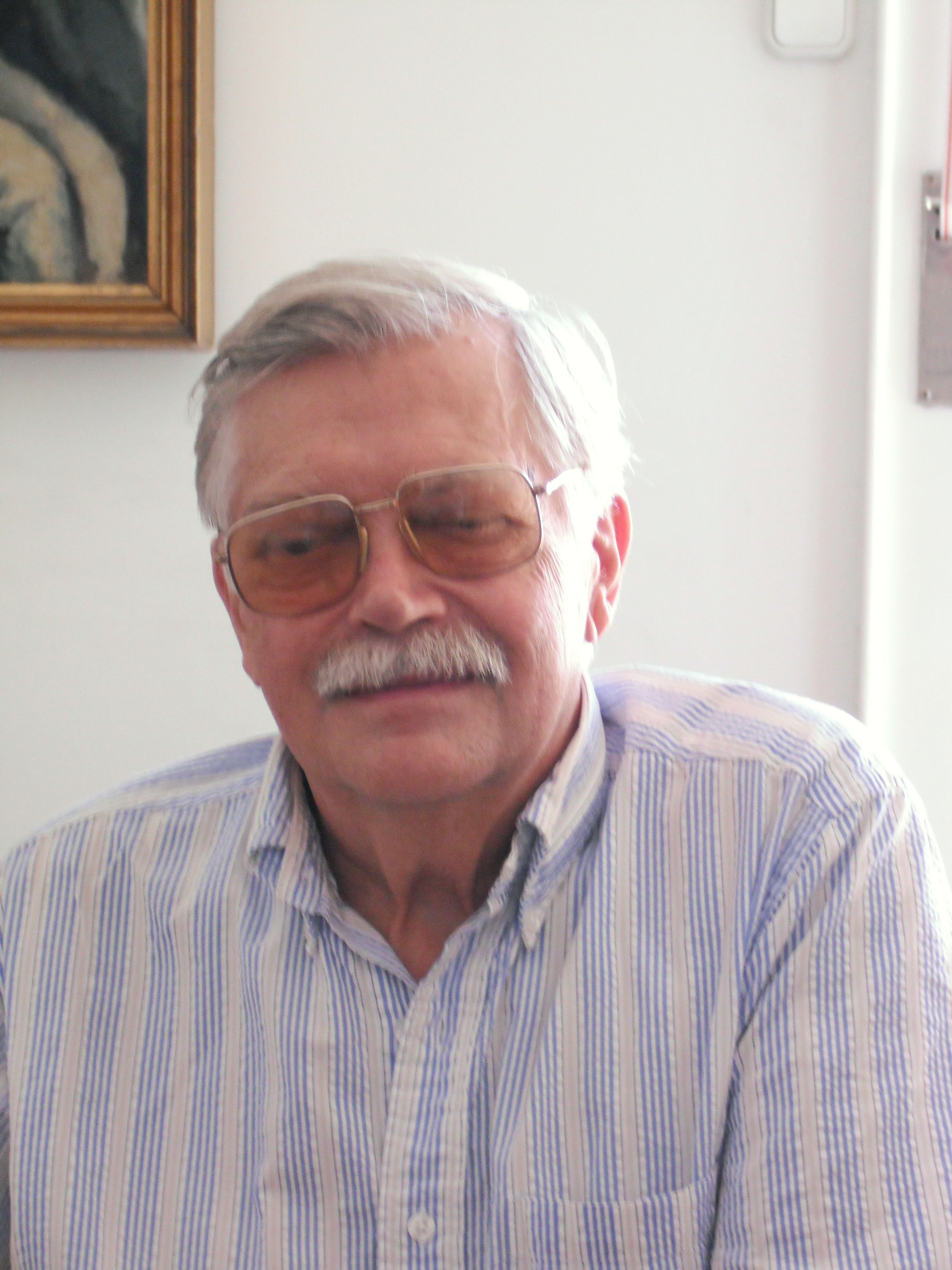
- Szelényi in 2009
- Born: 17 April 1938; Budapest, Hungary
- Died: 3 August 2026 (aged 88); Budapest, Hungary
- Occupations: Scholar, academic
- Title: William Graham Sumner Emeritus Professor of Sociology, Yale University, Foundation Dean of Social Sciences, NYUAD
- Board member of: Editorial Board of Theory & Society
- Spouse(s): Katalin Szelényi (m. 1960; died 1999), Vanilia Majoros (m. 2003; div. 2015)
- Children: Szonja Ivester, Lilla Szelényi, Balázs Szelényi
- Awards: Fellow at the Hungarian Academy of Sciences, Fellow at American Academy of Arts and Sciences, Széchenyi Prize

Academic background
- Education: Hungarian Academy of Sciences; Ph.D., D.Sc.
- Thesis: Urban inequalities under state socialism (1973)

Academic work
- Discipline: Sociology
- Sub-discipline: comparative sociology, class analysis, urban sociology, social theory, socialist societies
- Institutions: New York University, Yale University, University of California, Los Angeles, CUNY Graduate Center, University of Wisconsin–Madison, Flinders University, Hungarian Academy of Sciences
- Notable students: Bruce Western, Lawrence King, Katherine Beckett
- Main interests: Social inequality

Iván Szelényi (17 April 1938 – 3 August 2026) was a Hungarian and American sociologist. As of 2010, he was the Dean of Social Sciences at New York University Abu Dhabi.

== Life and career ==
Iván Szelényi was born in Budapest, Hungary on 17 April 1938, the son of Gusztáv Szelényi, an entomologist and Julianna Csapó.

Szelényi studied at the External Trade Faculty of the Karl Marx University of Economics in Budapest, where he graduated in 1960. After graduating, he was employed at the Hungarian Central Statistical Office. He received a Ford Foundation scholarship and studied at the University of California, Berkeley, for one year. After his return he was a research fellow at the Institute of Sociology at the Hungarian Academy of Sciences (HAS). In 1967, he was elevated as scientific secretary and in 1970 as the Head of the Department of Regional Sociology. In 1973, he earned the title Candidate of Sciences (PhD) at the HAS. In 1974, a transcript of a book which he wrote with fellow sociologist and author György Konrád, titled The Intellectuals on the Road to Class Power, was brought out in Hungary. The book contained critical thoughts about Communist-ruled society. After this move, Szelényi was arrested, later expelled from Hungary and stripped of his citizenship.

In 1975, he was a visiting research professor at the University of Kent. One year later he was invited to Flinders University where he was the Foundation Professor of Sociology and Chair of the Department until 1980. In 1981, he joined the University of Wisconsin–Madison, where he was Professor of Sociology for five years (the last year as the Karl Polanyi Professor). After that he was appointed Distinguished Professor of Sociology, Director of the Center for Social Research and Executive Officer of the Sociology Program at the CUNY Graduate Center.

From 1988 to 1999, he worked as Professor of Sociology at the University of California, Los Angeles (between 1992 and 1995 as department chair). In 1999, he was appointed William Graham Sumner Professor of Sociology and Professor of Political Science at Yale University. He chaired the department two times (1999–2002 and 2008–2009). In 2010, he became the Dean of Social Sciences at New York University Abu Dhabi, where he continued to teach.

After the political change in Hungary, his citizenship was reinstated. From 1990 to his death in 2026, he held a Doctor of Science degree and became a corresponding member of the Hungarian Academy of Sciences. He was elected to full membership in 1995. In 2006, he received the highest state prize for scientific work, the Széchenyi Prize, and two years later he became an Honorary Citizen of Budapest. Beyond that, he was elected to the American Academy of Arts and Sciences in 2000.

== Personal life and death ==
He was the father of three children. Szelényi died after a long illness on 3 August 2026, at the age of 88.

== Works ==
At the beginning of his scientific work, his research focused on urban communities. He wrote numerous publications on that issue, mostly in Hungarian. His critical stance on partyline issues was published in his book The Intellectuals on the Road to Class Power, which was published in English in 1979. It was also translated into German, French, Spanish and Japanese.

After he was forced to leave Hungary, his research profile changed. He studied the inequality in urban communities and the structural problems of the capitalistic and socialistic society. His most important publications of these are Urban Inequalities under State Socialism (1983), Socialist Entrepreneurs. Embourgeoisement in Rural Hungary (1988), Social Conflicts of Post-communist Transitions (1992) and Making Capitalism without Capitalists (1998).

Some of his works were collected and published in 1990 and 2009.

== Bibliography ==
=== Books in English ===
- Szelényi, Iván and Mihályi, Péter. (Nov 28, 2019). Varieties of Post-communist Capitalism. Leiden: Brill Publishers. ISBN 978-90-04-41318-4
- Ladányi, János; Szelényi, Iván (30 May 2006). Patterns of Exclusion: Constructing Gypsy Ethnicity and the Making of an Underclass in Transitional Societies of Europe. New York: East European Monographs. ISBN 0880335742.
- King, Lawrence Peter; Szelényi, Iván (23 April 2004). Theories Of The New Class: Intellectuals And Power. Contradictions of Modernity. Minneapolis: University of Minnesota Press. ISBN 081664344X.
- Eyal, Gil; Szelényi, Iván; Townsley, Eleanor (17 March 2001). Making Capitalism Without Capitalists: The New Ruling Elites in Eastern Europe. Brooklyn: Verso Books. ISBN 1859843123.
- Szelényi, Iván (15 June 1988). Socialist Entrepreneurs: Embourgeoisement in Rural Hungary. Madison: University of Wisconsin Press. ISBN 0299113647.
- Szelényi, Iván (15 December 1983). Urban Inequalities Under State Socialism. New York: Oxford University Press. ISBN 0198771762.
- Konrád, György; Szelényi, Iván (1 July 1979). The Intellectuals on the Road to Class Power: A Sociological Study of the Role of the Intelligentsia in Socialism. San Diego: Harcourt Brace Jovanovich. ISBN 0151778604.
