= Crime and Corruption Commission =

State government commission in Queensland, Australia

Commission overview
- Formed: 1 January 2002; 24 years ago
- Preceding agencies: Criminal Justice Commission; Queensland Crime Commission
- Jurisdiction: Queensland
- Headquarters: 515 St Pauls Terrace, Fortitude Valley
- Motto: Fighting crime and promoting integrity in Queensland
- Employees: 335
- Annual budget: $64.9 million
- Commission executive: Bruce Barbour, Acting Chairperson
- Key document: Crime and Corruption Act 2001
- Website: ccc.qld.gov.au

The Crime and Corruption Commission (CCC) is an independent Queensland Government integrity agency created to combat and reduce the incidence of major crime and to continuously improve the integrity of, and to reduce the incidence of misconduct in, the Queensland public sector. Formerly the Crime and Misconduct Commission (CMC) 2002–2014. The CCC also has a witness protection function. The commission was established on 1 January 2002, when the former Criminal Justice Commission and the Queensland Crime Commission were merged into a single entity under the name Crime and Misconduct Commission.

The CCC has investigative powers, not ordinarily available to the police service, for the purposes of enabling the commission to effectively investigate particular cases of major crime. The CCC also has the power to investigate cases of misconduct in the Queensland public sector, particularly the more serious cases of misconduct.

The CCC is itself accountable to the Parliamentary Crime and Corruption Committee of the Legislative Assembly of Queensland.

As the successor to the Criminal Justice Commission, the misconduct functions of the CCC exist primarily as a consequence of the Fitzgerald Inquiry Royal Commission findings of long-term, systemic political corruption, police corruption and abuse of power in Queensland.

== History ==
The commission was established after the publishing of a report by Bob Bottom. It conducted a high-profile investigation into matters related to the 2004 Palm Island death in custody.

=== 2007 ===
In 2007, the CMC Director of Intelligence claimed a lack of telephone interception or phone tapping powers meant crime bosses in Queensland were avoiding prosecution. In 2010, the first public hearings conducted by the CMC were held in relation to police corruption on the Gold Coast following the Operation Tesco misconduct probe. In 2012, the Newman Government reduced funding to the organisation by 1%. The cuts had a disproportionate effect on staff numbers.

=== 2012 ===
In October 2012, the Queensland Government announced the commissioning of a review of the Crime and Misconduct Commission by former High Court judge Ian Callinan, wanting an assessment of what the priorities of the organisation should be, and "the use or any abuse of the powers and functions" conferred on it. The review was criticised by some as arising from resentment about five complaints made to the CMC by the then Labor government about Campbell Newman in the lead-up to his election as premier.

=== 2013 ===
In March 2013, the Crime and Misconduct Commission came in for strong criticism from Liz Cunningham, chair of the Queensland Parliamentary Crime and Misconduct Committee, over the incorrect public release of documents relating to the Fitzgerald Inquiry. The criticism was backed up by former Queensland attorney-general Paul Clauson, who helped establish the corruption watchdog in the late 1980s, and who likened the organisation to the Stasi. Attorney-General Jarrod Bleijie said he would meet with Ian Callinan and ask him to look into these revelations as well.

The Parliamentary Inquiry into the anti-corruption watchdog heard that the accidental release and prolonged availability of secret Fitzgerald Inquiry documents at the Queensland State Archives was attributed to a clerical error. The documents included information about targets and informants and were not to be released until 2055. The 741 pages were wrongly classified, leading to their automatic release after 20 years instead of the preferred 65 years. The documents were made available in February 2012. The matter came to the attention of Ross Martin in May 2012. It was not until March 2013 that they became unavailable. The Parliamentary Inquiry also heard that documents containing intelligence used to instigate an investigation had been accidentally shredded.

=== 2014 ===
The Crime and Misconduct Commission was the subject of further controversy in 2014, with former Australian Federal Police chief Mick Keelty saying it was "obsessed with independence" and describing as in danger of becoming corrupt itself, and Attorney-General Jarrod Bleijie saying, "Over the years we have seen the CMC used as a political football by the Labor party and what we want to do is stop that from happening." The government introduced reforms included renaming the organisation as the Crime and Corruption Commission.

=== 2021 ===
Following Commission investigations into members of the Ipswich City Council and other councils, the Parliamentary Crime and Corruption Committee found the Chair 'did not ensure the watchdog acted at all times independently and impartially'. The fourteen findings included that the Commission did not take into account all evidence, and that the structure of the Commission should be reviewed.

=== 2022 ===
With calls to resign in late 2021, on Friday 28 January 2022, the chair, Alan MacSporran QC, resigned, citing a toxic relationship with the parliamentary oversight committee, resulting in an irretrievable breakdown. An acting chair was appointed.

On 31 January 2022, Queensland Premier Annastacia Palaszczuk announced Tony Fitzgerald would chair a commission of inquiry into the State's anti-corruption body after a scathing 2021 report. Fitzgerald was the chair of the 1987–1989 inquiry that in part resulted in the establishment of the Criminal Justice Commission, the forerunner of the Crime and Misconduct Commission and today's Crime and Corruption Commission. Fitzgerald's new inquiry concluded 32 recommendations were needed to restore public confidence in the organisation.

== See also ==
- List of law enforcement agencies in Australia
