= Colin Hughes =

British-Australian political scientist (1930–2017)

- Born: Colin Anfield Hughes; 4 May 1930; The Bahamas
- Died: 30 June 2017 (aged 87); Peregian Springs, Queensland, Australia
- Citizenship: Australian
- Education: Columbia University; London School of Economics
- Occupation: Political scientist

Colin Anfield Hughes (4 May 1930 – 30 June 2017) was a British-Australian academic specialising in electoral politics and government. He was emeritus professor of political science at the University of Queensland and chairman of the Queensland Constitutional Review Commission (1999–2000).

Hughes was born in The Bahamas, where his Welsh father, John Anfield Hughes, was a school administrator, and later district commissioner of several Bahamian islands. During World War II, he moved to the United States, where he received his B.A. and M.A. degrees from Columbia University and his PhD from the London School of Economics. In 1966, along with John S. Western, Hughes published a study of Australia's first ever televised policy speech on 12 November 1963, by then prime minister Sir Robert Menzies. At this time, Hughes was a Fellow in Political Science at the Australian National University. At time of the 1966 publication, he was a Professor of Political Science and Western Senior Lecturer in Political Science at the University of Queensland.

Their study comprised 250 voters who viewed the policy speech, examined the effect of this form of political communication, and traced its impact on the knowledge, attitudes, and opinions of this group. This was the first such detailed study undertaken in Australia, providing a testing of theories of cognitive equilibrium in relation to voting behaviour, and an examination of television's use in political communication.

Hughes was the first Australian Electoral Commissioner at the Australian Electoral Commission from 1984 to 1989 (in 1984 the AEC replaced the Australian Electoral Office, which had existed since 1902).

== Works ==
- Hughes, Colin A.; Western, John S. (1964). Televised Politics: an interim report. Canberra: Australia National University Press.
- Hughes, Colin A. (1966). Sir Robert Menzies, 1894–1978. Canberra: Australia National University Press.
- Hughes, Colin A.; Western, John S. (1966). The Prime Minister's Policy Speech: A Case Study in Televised Politics. Canberra: Australian National University Press.
- Hughes, Colin A. (1976). Mr Prime Minister. Australian Prime Ministers 1901–1972. Melbourne: Oxford University Press. ISBN 0-19-550471-2
- Hughes, Colin A. (1980). The Government of Queensland. Brisbane: University of Queensland Press.ISBN 978-0702215162
- Hughes, Colin A.; John Western) (1983). The Mass Media in Australia. Brisbane: University of Queensland Press. ISBN 0-7022-1692-5
- Hughes, Colin A. (2000) [1978]. The Handbook of Australian Government and Politics, 1965–1974. Canberra.ISBN 978-0708113400
- Hughes, Colin A. (2000). A Handbook of Australian Government and Politics 1985–1999. Canberra: Federation Press.
- Hughes, Colin A. (2010). Race and Politics in the Bahamas. Brisbane: University of Queensland Press.
