= John Western =

John Stuart Western AM FASSA (16 March 1931 – 6 January 2011) was an Australian academic and author.

He received his B.A. and M.A. and his Diploma of Social Studies from the University of Melbourne, and his Ph.D. from Columbia University in 1959. In 1966, along with Colin A. Hughes, he published a study of Australia's first televised policy speech on 12 November 1963, by then prime minister Sir Robert Menzies. At this time, Western was a lecturer in psychology at the Australian National University.

Their study comprised 250 voters who viewed the policy speech, examined the effect of this form of political communication, and traced its impact on the knowledge, attitudes, and opinions of this group. This was the first such detailed study undertaken in Australia, providing a testing of theories of cognitive equilibrium in relation to voting behaviour, and an examination of television's use in political communication.

Western moved to the University of Queensland in 1966 and was appointed Professor of Sociology at the University of Queensland in 1970. He was elected a Fellow of the Academy of the Social Sciences in Australia in 1984. He specialised in the sociology of mass communication, class and inequality, and the professions in Australia. He also served as a Commissioner on the Queensland Criminal Justice Commission from 1990 until 1994. He was appointed a Member of the Order of Australia in the 2009 Queen's Birthday Honours for "service to education in the area of sociology as an academic, researcher and author".

Western had two sons, Mark and Bruce, both of whom are sociologists.

== Bibliography ==
- Hughes, Colin A; Western, John S (1966), The Prime Minister's Policy Speech: A Case Study in Televised Politics, Canberra: Australian National University Press
- Western, John Stuart; Hughes, Colin A. (1983). The Mass Media in Australia: Use and Evaluation. Brisbane: University of Queensland Press. ISBN 0-7022-1692-5
- Western, John Stuart (1983). Social Inequality in Australian Society. Brisbane: Macmillan. ISBN 978-0333338957
