= Lawrence King (sociologist) =

- Born: Lawrence Peter King; 20 October 1966 (age 59); Halifax, Nova Scotia, Canada
- Partner: Alison Pollet

Academic background
- Education: University of Michigan, Ann Arbor; University of California, Los Angeles
- Thesis: Pathways from Socialism to Capitalism (1997)
- Academic advisor: Iván Szelényi

Academic work
- Discipline: Economics; sociology
- Sub-discipline: Political economy
- Institutions: Yale University; University of Cambridge; University of Massachusetts, Amherst

Lawrence Peter King (born 20 October 1966) is a professor of economics at the University of Massachusetts Amherst. Prior to 2017, he held a position as a professor of sociology and political economy at the University of Cambridge. His research work is focused on the political economy of postcommunism and, more recently, the political economy of public health.

King graduated from the University of Michigan, Ann Arbor (BA), and the University of California, Los Angeles (MA and PhD). Prior to his appointment in Cambridge, he served as assistant professor (1997–2003) and associate professor (2004–2006) at Yale University.
