= Becky Pettit =

American sociologist

Elizabeth M. Pettit
- Born: February 4, 1970 (age 55)
- Education: University of California at Berkeley (B.A. 1992), Princeton University (M.A., 1997; Ph.D., 1999)
- Awards: James Short paper award from the American Sociological Association's Crime, Law, and Deviance Section
- Scientific career
- Fields: Sociology, demography
- Institutions: University of Texas-Austin, University of Washington
- Thesis: Navigating networks and neighborhoods: an analysis of the residential mobility of the urban poor (1999)
- Doctoral advisor: Sara McLanahan

Elizabeth M. "Becky" Pettit (born February 4, 1970) is an American sociologist with expertise in demography. She has been a professor of sociology at the University of Texas-Austin, as well as an affiliate at its Population Research Center, since 2014. She is an advocate for decarceration in the United States.

== Education ==
Pettit received her B.A. summa cum laude from the University of California at Berkeley in 1992. She went on to receive her M.A. and Ph.D. from Princeton University in 1997 and 1999, respectively.

== Career ==
In 1999, Pettit joined the faculty of the University of Washington as an assistant professor of sociology, where she became an associate professor in 2007 and a full professor in 2011. For two years (2009–2011), she was the associate chair of the University of Washington's sociology department. In 2014, she left the University of Washington for the University of Texas-Austin.

== Research ==
Pettit's research focuses on various aspects of social inequality. For instance, in her 2012 book Invisible Men: Mass Incarceration and the Myth of Black Progress, she argues that mass incarceration in the United States has distorted our perception of racial equality because government surveys tend to undercount prisoners. When, in this book, she added prisoners to these surveys, she found that the status of black Americans has not significantly improved since the 1960s. She has also studied the effects of incarceration on families and racial inequality. With Bruce Western, she has also studied other social consequences of incarceration, such as decreased earnings for former prisoners.

== Editorial activities ==
From 2011 to 2014, Pettit was the editor-in-chief of Social Problems. She is currently an advisory editor for Social Problems and a member of the editorial board of American Sociological Review.
