= Bruce Western =

American sociologist

Bruce Prichart Western
- Born: July 1, 1964 (age 61); Australia
- Education: University of Queensland (B.A., 1987); CUNY Graduate Center (PhD student, 1987-1988); University of California, Los Angeles (M.A., 1990; PhD 1993)
- Known for: Research into mass incarceration
- Spouse: Yes
- Children: 3 daughters
- Scientific career
- Fields: Sociology
- Institutions: Columbia University; Harvard University
- Thesis: Unionization trends in postwar capitalism: a comparative study of working class organization (1993)
- Doctoral advisor: Iván Szelényi

Bruce Prichart Western (born July 1, 1964) is an Australian-born American sociologist and President of the Russell Sage Foundation. In 2023, he was elected to the American Philosophical Society.

== Early life and education ==
Western was born in Australia, to a white native Australian father who taught at the University of Queensland, and a Thai international student mother. His father was John Western. He became interested in inequality in Australia growing up in Queensland, where he, his brother, and their mother stood out as racial minorities. He received his B.A. in government with honors from the University of Queensland in 1987. That year, Western then became a student in the doctoral program in sociology at the Graduate Center, CUNY, with the intention of both working with sociologist Iván Szelényi and fulfilling a long-held dream of living in New York City. Szelenyi left the Graduate Center in 1988, and Western followed him to the University of California, Los Angeles, where he subsequently received his master's and Ph.D. degrees in sociology from in 1990 and 1993, respectively.

== Career ==
After receiving his PhD, Western taught at Princeton University for fourteen years. He taught at Harvard University from 2007 to 2018, where he was a professor of sociology in the Faculty of Arts and Sciences and the director of the Kennedy School's Multidisciplinary Program in Inequality and Social Policy. and the Daniel and Florence Guggenheim Professor of Criminal Justice Policy, as well as director of the Malcolm Wiener Center for Social Policy and faculty chair of the Program in Criminal Justice Policy and Management at Harvard's John F. Kennedy School of Government. From 2018 to 2024, he was Bryce Professor of Sociology and Social Justice at Columbia University and director of the Columbia University Justice Lab.

== Research ==
=== Prisons and mass incarceration ===
Originally, Western's research pertained to organized labor, but he became interested in researching prisons and mass incarceration, in his words, "almost by accident" after talking to a colleague about the United States' use of prisons to manage disadvantaged populations. As of 2008, he had written or co-written more than a dozen articles about prisons, as well as a book (Punishment and Inequality in America) on the same topic. In Punishment and Inequality in America, originally published in 2006, he concludes that "mass imprisonment has erased many of the 'gains to African American citizenship hard won by the civil rights movement.'" In a 2010 study, Western and fellow sociologist Becky Pettit outlined the way in which, according to them, poverty increases prison populations and these populations in turn increase poverty. Other studies co-authored by Pettit and Western have found that on average, incarceration reduces annual salaries by about 40% for the average male former prisoner, and reduces hourly wages by, on average, 11% and annual employment by nine weeks. In 2009, with Devah Pager and Naomi Sugie, he found African American job applicants with a criminal record were less likely to receive a call back after an interview than white applicants with a criminal record.

As of 2013, Western was studying what happens to prisoners after they are released, and has interviewed the subjects of the study in person, which has, according to Elizabeth Gudrais, "put a human face on the statistics and dashed preconceived notions in the process." In 2015, he published a study based on these interviews, showing that 40% of the recently incarcerated prisoners he interviewed in the Boston area had witnessed a killing when they were children. Another finding of his research on these released prisoners was that most of them immediately return to poverty upon their release.

=== Unions ===
He has also researched the relationship between the decline of unions and increasing income inequality, and has found that the former accounted for a third of the increase in income inequality among male workers.

== Honors and awards ==
In 2005, while on the faculty of the Woodrow Wilson School of Public and International Affairs at Princeton, Western received a Guggenheim Fellowship for his project, "The Growth and Consequences of American Inequality." His book Punishment and Inequality in America won both the 2008 Michael J. Hindelang Book Award from the American Society of Criminology and the 2007 Albert J. Reiss, Jr. Distinguished Scholarship Award from the American Sociological Association. Western was inducted into the National Academy of Sciences in 2015.

== Personal life ==
Western lives in New York, New York. He has three daughters, and the oldest works at an all-girls middle school in Charlottesville, VA where she teaches Latin.
