= Criminal Justice Commission (Queensland) =

Former state government commission in Queensland, Australia

The Criminal Justice Commission was established in 1989 by the Queensland Criminal Justice Act 1989, following widespread corruption amongst high-level Queensland politicians and police officers being uncovered in the Fitzgerald Inquiry. It has since merged in 2002 with the Queensland Crime Commission to form the Crime and Misconduct Commission.

The Criminal Justice Commission was the direct precursor body for the oversight functions of the Crime and Misconduct Commission, however where the Crime and Misconduct Commission has authority over all areas of the Queensland Public Service the Criminal Justice Commission was limited to the oversight of the Queensland Police Service.

The Criminal Justice Commission was responsible for significant research into the Queensland Police Service. Further it released a series of research papers on a variety of aspects of Crime in Queensland.

It had an initial budget of $5 million. A five-member group referred to as the Commission led the organisation.

== Commissioners ==
- Sir Max Bingham (1989–1990)
- John Western (1990–1994)
