= Queensland Crime Commission =

The Queensland Crime Commission (QCC) was an independent Queensland Government entity established on 2 March 1998 to investigate criminal activity, in particular, criminal paedophilia and major and organised crime. On 1 January 2002, the QCC and the former Criminal Justice Commission were merged to establish the Queensland Crime and Misconduct Commission.
