= Pig City =

Pig City is the title of several works of media:

- "Pig City" (song), a 1983 song by Brisbane band The Parameters
  - Pig City (book), a 2004 book about the Brisbane music scene named after the song
  - Pig City (music festival), a 2007 music festival in Brisbane named after the book
  - Pig City (symposium), a symposium held the day before the festival
- Pig City (TV series), an animated series about three pig cousins living together
- Pig City (novel), an alternative UK title for the children's novel Sixth Grade Secrets by Louis Sachar
