= Queensland Council for Civil Liberties =

Australian civil liberties organisation

- Formation: 1966
- Type: NGO
- Headquarters: Brisbane, Australia
- President, Vice-president: Michael Cope, Terry O'Gorman, Angus Murray
- Website: http://www.qccl.org.au

The Queensland Council for Civil Liberties (QCCL) is a voluntary organisation in Australia concerned with the protection of individual rights and civil liberties. It was founded in 1966 in order "to protect and promote the human rights and freedoms of Queensland citizens." The QCCL is regularly asked by the Government to make submissions to committees, which is how bills are made in Parliament. These submissions cover issues such as closed circuit television, abortion law reform, sentencing issues in our court system and changes to legislation already in place, which are called amendments.

In 1979, Terry O'Gorman was elected President of the QCCL and served as president up until 1985. He again held presidency from 1990 to 1994. O'Gorman specialises in criminal law. The Fitzgerald Inquiry began in 1987 and Tony Fitzgerald, QC, was appointed as its head on 26 May. The inquiry was a turning point in the fight for civil rights and the investigation of police misconduct and corruption. During the Inquiry, Terry O'Gorman cross-examined Joh Bjelke-Petersen, who had attempted to shut down the inquiry unsuccessfully.

== History ==
=== Pre-council history ===
The Queensland Council for Civil Liberties is a sub-branch of the Australian Council for Civil Liberties, established in 1936. The Australian Council for Civil Liberties gives a national voice for Queensland, New South Wales and Victorian civil liberties councils. The continual violations of civil liberties in Queensland, particularly the suppression of civil rights during Protests against the Vietnam War, led to the formation of the QCCL.

==== Meetings ====
On 20 June 1966, the first meeting to establish a Queensland Council for Civil Liberties was held. This meeting was disrupted by groups of left and right wing political persuasions who disagreed on how to achieve the major objectives of the Council

A second meeting was held on 19 August 1966, but again this meeting was infiltrated by the right wing organisation The Catholic Action Group who aimed to prevent the Council obtaining a left-wing orientation. At this meeting the group dominated the newly formed council with conservative views and altered the name of this newly evolving civil liberties group to 'The Queensland Association for Civil Liberties.' Due to this takeover, many members withdrew and The Queensland Association for Civil Liberties once again changed its name, this time to the Ombudsman Association of Queensland.

A third attempt to create a Queensland Council for Civil Liberties, free of political or sectarian influence, was made at a private meeting on 19 October 1966. The development of this group succeeded and the group received recognition from both the New South Wales and Victorian Council for Civil Liberty groups.

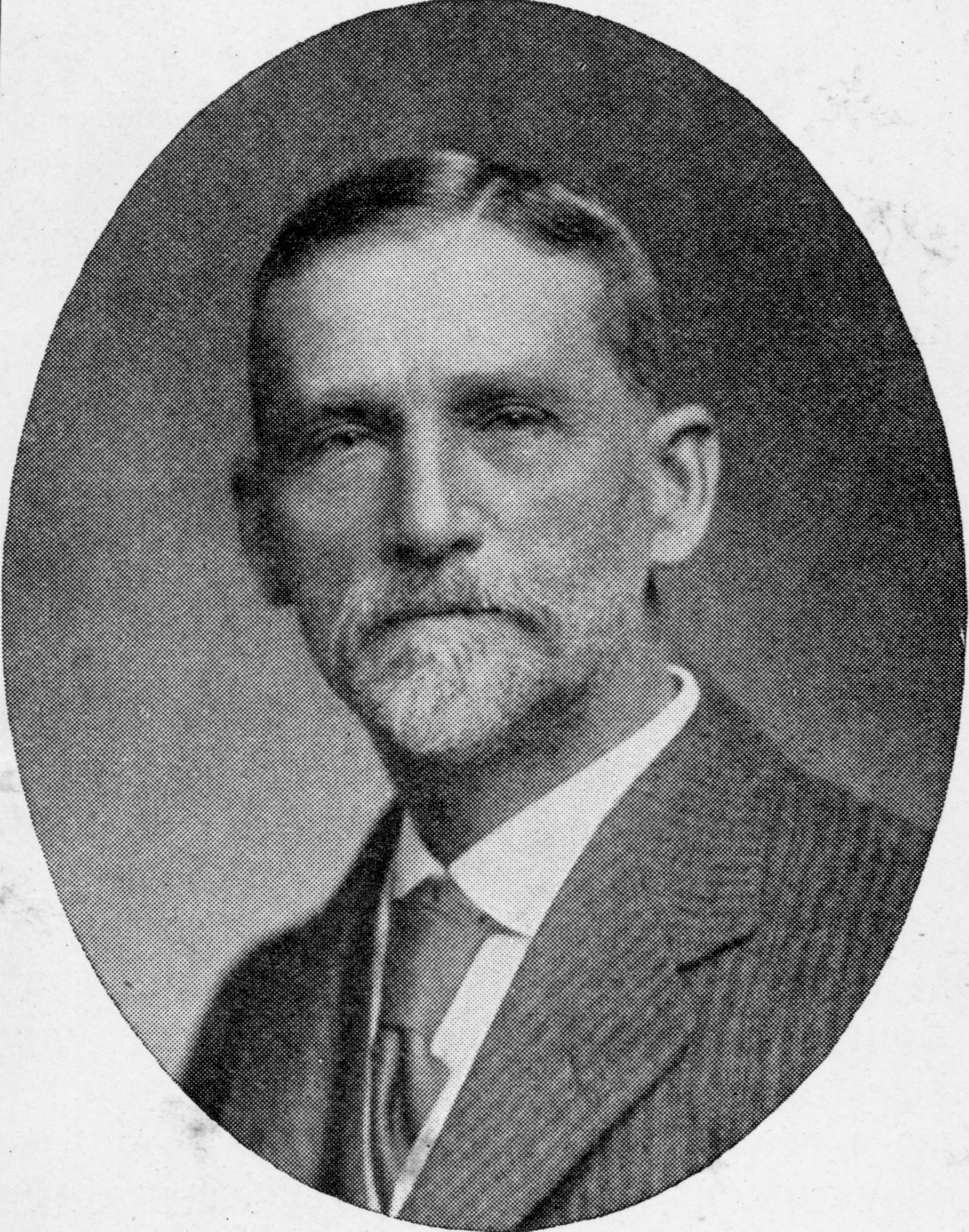
Conservative former Queensland Premier Digby Denham, who was responsible for passing the 1912 Industrial Peace Act, which imposed penalties on strikers. The QCCL work to facilitate safe and productive striking practice.

==== Civil liberties and the right to strike ====
Australian Governments have produced many Acts of Parliament and subsequently, various amendments to try to find a solution to striking. Meanwhile, the Queensland Council for Civil Liberties work to facilitate safe and productive striking practice In 1912, the right to strike was essentially quashed by a conservative Queensland government, led by Digby Denham, who passed the 1912 Industrial Peace Act in Queensland, which was an Act imposing penalties on strikers. Following this first instance of the government retaliating to strikers and subsequent strikes, The State Transport Act 1938 and The Industrial Law Amendment Act 1948 extended the power of the police to use force and arrest citizens without a warrant, effectively reducing protests and strike action.

==== The Industrial Law Amendment Act ====
The 1948 Queensland Railway strike was a strike lasting nine weeks, from February to April 1948, and concerned the wages of Railway and Locomotive workers in Queensland. It was prompted by a low-wage policy introduced by the Halon Labor Government. The Government issued the Industrial Law Amendment Act in order to prohibit protests and strike action. As well as this, a state of emergency was issued by the Hanlon Government. Police powers were extended, and through the initiation of these acts they were given the power to arrest citizens without a warrant and use force where necessary. Severe police brutality occurred during an illegal march on Saint Patrick's Day, 19 March 1948, when strikers were arrested, several demonstrators were hospitalised and union offices were raided. Eventually, wage increases were granted and emergency powers were revoked.

==== The State Transport Act ====
During 1966, the Government commenced severe violations to civil liberties of Queensland citizens, this time in response to anti-Vietnam War demonstrations. The Federal Government of Australia introduced conscription in order to send Australian troops to the Vietnam War and in response to Anti-Vietnam War protests, the Queensland Government introduced the Traffic Act.

Anti conscription marches were held throughout Australia on 5 October 1966 and Queensland was the only state in Australia where the police made misuse of the Traffic Act and arrested a number of demonstrators. Under the Traffic Act, police permits were required to have marches or meetings, even to display placards, and permits could be refused without reason. Brian Laver, one of the students who got arrested, chose to be imprisoned instead of paying a fine to show his resistance of the laws and regulations used to suppress demonstrations and marches. QCCL President at the time Jim Kelly wrote in an article featured in The Courier-Mail in January 1967 that the Council supported him.

==== Free speech and the Objectionable Literature Act ====
Under the Objectionable Literature Act of 1954, the Parliament of Queensland established a Literature board of Review so that the government may outlaw the distribution of questionable publications. This meant that the review held the power to ban any and all publications that were seen to be:

- Unduly emphasizing acts of sex, horror, crime, cruelty, and violence.
- Blasphemous, indecent, obscene, or likely to be injurious to morality.
- Likely to encourage depravity, public disorder, or indictable offence.
- Otherwise calculated to injure the citizens of Queensland.

The board of review consisted of four men and one woman, appointed by the governor-in-council. The board was able to ban literature without any notice of a prohibition order, nor were they required to hear representations from any publishers or distributors. Additionally the board was able to ban future issues of a publication regardless of whether the literature had been examined or not, however bans could be lifted if the board felt the publication had been 'reconstructed'. From the establishment of the Literature Board of Review in 1954 til 1981, 607 banning orders were made in Queensland with only six being disputed before the Supreme Court.

==== Civil Rights Action Committee and QCCL ====
In June 1966, the Civil Rights Action Committee (CRAC) was established to seek reforms to the traffic regulations yet the Government rejected their submissions. The QCCL actively support the efforts of the CRAC. The University of Queensland Students' Union had also criticised the use of traffic legislation and the use of unnecessary police violence during the arrests of peaceful demonstrators. Furthermore, in early 1967, the Civil Liberties Co-ordination Committee (CLCC) and Students for Democratic Action, both based on the University of Queensland campus, had formed to oppose the restrictions of civil liberties.

The CLCC planned a protest march without a permit from the university to the city on 11 July 1967, but a mass meeting of students voted to postpone this until 5 September 1967 to give time for negotiations with the Queensland Government. On 7 August, Frank Gardiner, a moderate president of the Students' Union and later a vice-president of the QCCL, presented to Queensland Premier George Nicklin a submission to reform provisions of the Traffic Act and Council President Kelly and Council Secretary Lindsay Smith took part in preparing this submission.

Cabinet made a few limited concessions but they would not concede any changes to the major point of discontent – that police could refuse permits without reason. This heightened the suspicions of civil liberties advocates that the police, acting as agents of the Government, could discriminate against groups espousing unpopular causes. "A deeply conservative State Government, under Queensland Premiers Frank Nicklin and later Joh Bjelke-Petersen, was determined to show protestors "who was boss". Marchers could be targeted, bashed by police, arrested, strip-searched, and spend at least one, and sometimes several days in the police "watch house" before release."

On 8 September 1967, students and staff of the University of Queensland marched without a permit from the campus to the city, opposite to The Cabinet. The march was obstructed by the police before it arrived at the destination and consequently they staged a mass sit-down protest in Roma St, causing 144 arrests. "The 1967 Civil Liberties March was a turning point in student and State politics, subsequently leading to mass protests against the Vietnam War and the success of the emerging student movement in the decade to follow. The 1967–68 and post-1977 campaigns were the only major protests of that era anywhere in Australia where the issue was specifically about civil liberties, free speech, and the democratic "right to protest" itself." In 1972, the Gough Whitlam Federal Government defused anti-Vietnam war protests when it ended conscription and commitment to the war in Vietnam.

=== Founding years ===
==== Membership ====
To avoid infiltration by politically motivated groups the Queensland Council for Civil Liberties made membership open to anyone who subscribed to the aims outlined in the draft constitution. The Council aimed to be both non-political, non-sectarian and neither anti-police nor anti-government. Although QCCL is open to anyone, members must "subscribe to the aims of the Council of safeguarding any liberties remaining from any infringement by police of political action"

Over the years, the council has faced difficulty recruiting members and has often held low membership rates. When the council first began in 1966 there was low support from University lecturers and lawyers, as people may have felt their jobs may be jeopardised for affiliating with the council and becoming members.

==== Communication ====
After the council was formed on 19 October 1966, led by President Jim Kelly, the council began establishing itself as an important civil liberties group in Queensland. They began producing information to be distributed to citizens that would inform them of their civil rights and consequently when the government made changes that impinged on citizens rights, the Council held them accountable. The QCCL has used newsletters as a form of communication between members. Due to the low membership rates, newsletter distribution over the years has been sporadic.

In 1967 the Council released its first booklet containing information that would assist citizens in their dealings with the Police. Entitled The Citizen and the Police, it contained subsections such as Types of Arrest, After Arrest, Bail and Proceedings in Court. This is just one example of the work the Council performed at a time when their assistance was greatly required. An updated version of this booklet under the same title was also released in 1982 by the QCCL.

==== The Right to Demonstrate ====
Upon deploying troops to Vietnam, anti-conscription demonstrations were held throughout Australia and such demonstrations of opinion were new to Queensland at this time. Queensland was the only State where police arrests were made, following the laws set out in the Traffic Act.

A group who fought for civil rights prior to the formation of the QCCL was The Queensland Civil Liberties League, who were active in supporting a campaign to vote no to banning the Communist Party in Australia. The QCLL, QCCL and University of Queensland Student Union organised a civil liberties street march from the university's St Lucia campus to Roma Street, Brisbane on September 8, 1967, with estimates of 4000 staff and students having participated. In 1968, one of the first moves by the council to support freedom of speech in Queensland, was when council president Jim Kelly supported Brisbane's first Nationalist Socialist Party meeting. He was published in The Australian stating 'the Council supported the principle of freedom of speech even for repugnant doctrines such as the Nazi Party'.

In 1981, the Coalition State government produced a Queen Street Mall Bill which increased police powers. Brisbane's Queen Street Mall featured heavily in the council's activity for many years after. Subsequent amendments to the Bill and the passing of the Local Government (Queen Street Mall) Act Amendment Act prohibited Queen Street Mall visitors from 'preaching, haranguing, singing, chanting, miming, recitals or other entertainments' unless a permit had been obtained from the Brisbane City Council. The Council continued to fight these restrictions and supported activists in their plights to allow freedom of speech in the Queen Street Mall. In a move that proved the council's success, a Brisbane City Council representative, David Hinchliffe, opened a Speakers' Corner in King George Square.

==== Aboriginal Australians and Citizenship – The Mabo Legislation ====
Aboriginal Land Right Protest

For many years, Aboriginal Australians and their supporters fought for civil rights and legal equality without the help of the QCCL.

Upon forming, the QCCL worked with Aboriginal welfare organisations to inform Aboriginals of their rights if arrested. In 1967, the Council supported the campaign to secure an affirmative vote in the Commonwealth referendum on the welfare of Aborigines. The 1967 referendum is historically noted as the 'citizenship maker' and the 1960s decade saw the Commonwealth and State Government abandon citizenship restrictions. The 1967 referendum awarded Aboriginal Australians full citizenship rights and the Federal Government a mandate over Aboriginal affairs (Daniels, 11). This vote also meant Aboriginals were granted the right to be included in population statistics.

Since the establishment of the Queensland Council for Civil Liberties, Australian state parliaments showed little interest in awarding Aboriginal Australians the right to land and Aboriginal Land rights were a topic of much criticism for the Queensland State Government. Premier Joh Bjelke-Petersen ruled that in 1982, Aboriginal Australians would only receive 'deeds of grant in trust' over reserve land. Bjelke-Petersen claimed that the Aboriginal land rights movement was little more than a plot to create a separate black nation in Australia.

=== Campaigns and activities: 1968–1976 ===
This was a time of great change in the fight for civil rights in Queensland. A new Premier, Joh Bjelke-Petersen, was sworn in during this time and many protests took place questioning this governments policies on civil liberties.

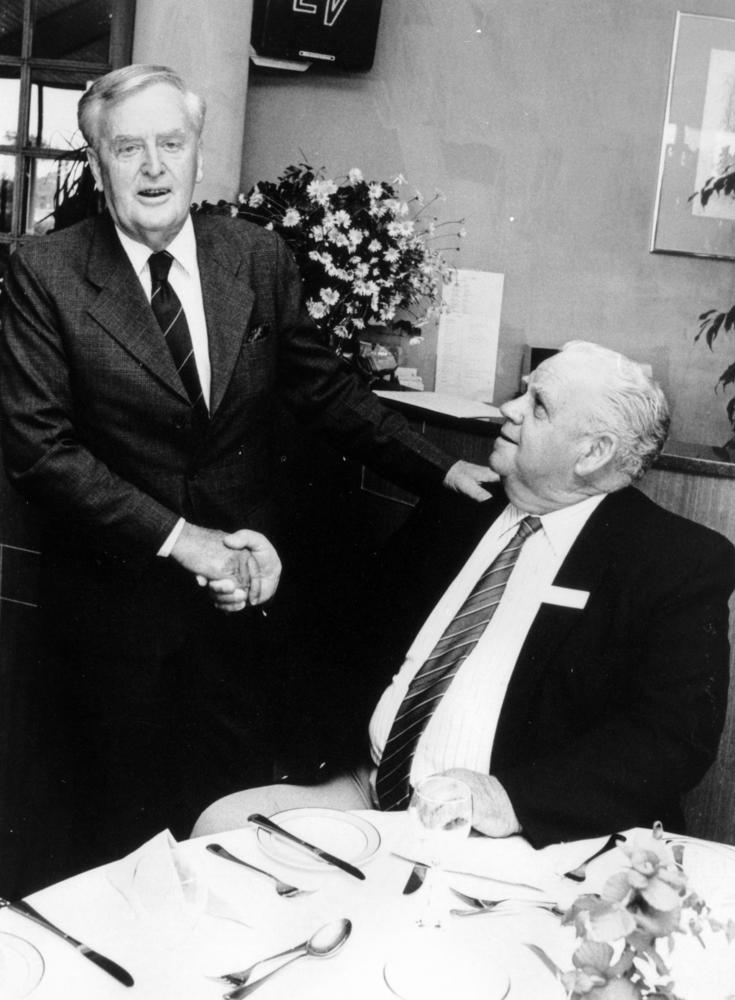
Sir Joh Bjelke-Petersen with Russ Hinze

==== Joh Bjelke-Petersen ====
Joh Bjelke-Petersen was elected the Premier of Queensland from 1968 until 1987. The QCCL was constantly involved with this government due to their repeated breaches of civil liberties. A substantial reason the council was created was to quell police misconduct and corruption and shortly after their formation, Bjelke-Petersen began what was concurrently described as a "corrupt and vicious regime. Police were accused of intimidatory tactics, brutality, and essentially of forming a police state in Queensland acting virtually as a private army for the regime."

In 1969 Bjelke-Petersen's censorship campaign extended from written publication into the theatre and prosecution began for utterances as well as written prose. As a result, Brisbane actor Norman Staines was arrested for the use of an obscene phrase during his one act performance of the play Norm and Ahmed. Staines was arrested by police, locked up and charged with using an obscene expression under The Vagrants, Gaming and Other Offences Act 1931–67, as a result almost every theatre company in Brisbane attacked the existing censorship system. This led to the promoter of the musical Hair refusing to bring the show to Brisbane theaters, in response cabinet member Russ Hinze condemned Hair as being appealing to only the 'sexually-depraved, or a group of homosexuals, lesbians, wifeswappers and spivs.'

=== The Springbok Tour ===
The Springbok Tour Demonstration, 1971

In July 1971, an Australian Rugby team the Wallabies played a test game against the touring Springboks, a white South African team. This was at a time of growing international opposition to South Africa's racist apartheid policies, and The Springbok's visit allowed the Queensland Premier, Bjelke-Petersen, to declare a state of emergency for a month. Police violence erupted when several hundred demonstrators assembled outside a Brisbane motel on Thursday 22 July 1971 where the Springbok team was staying. Observers claimed that the police, without warning or cause, charged at the demonstrators. Another confrontation took place between demonstrators and the police on the Friday night all but stopped short of physical violence. On Saturday evening, a large number of demonstrators assembled once more outside the Tower Mill Motel and after 15 minutes of peaceful protest, a brick was thrown into the motel room and police took action to clear the road and consequently disproportionate violence was used against demonstrators. A Journalist Hugh Lunn wrote that Bjelke-Petersen's state of emergency and police mobilisation resembled a full-scale operation, explaining the consequent inconvenience to the public, which accompanied the following demonstrations and police reaction, obscured the civil rights issues. Current Vice-president of the QCCL at the time, Terry O'Gorman, was first exposed to these abuses of civil rights during the Springbok Tour and when Bjelke-Petersen "declared a State of Emergency to ensure the match proceeded without incident."

=== Campaigns and activities: 1977–1981 ===
This era was an extremely contentious time for civil rights in Queensland. The first inquiry into police corruption under Bjelke-Petersen's government began; a major demonstrations took place and, it was an important era for women's rights in Queensland. Terry O'Gorman, one of the QCCL's most influential members, was also elected as President of the QCCL in 1979, taking over from Derek Fielding during this time. Terry O'Gorman and the QCCL members witnessed police corruption and the manner in which their clients were treated, which resulted in them "taking matters into their own hands" and secretly filming police. This would later be used as evidence against them in The Lucas Inquiry.

==== The Lucas Inquiry ====
The Lucas Inquiry, chaired by Justice GAG Lucas, began in 1976 and was constituted to look into police corruption. It was prompted by the QCCL, along with the Queensland Law Society, who demanded an inquiry after a continual stream of stories of police corruption began to surface in the media.

The aims of this inquiry were to:

- Investigate police fabrication of evidence and testimonies;
- Protect individuals from police interrogation and harassment and;
- To discover whether police have too much power interrogating, searching and arresting citizens.

The Lucas Inquiry emanated from the 'Southport Betting Case,' a trial in which a number of high-ranking police officers were alleged to have fabricated evidence to clear two bookmakers of prosecution. In November 1974 two suspected 'starting price' bookmakers, Brian Leonard George Sieber and Stanley Derwent Saunders, were charged and arrested "with possession of instruments of betting." It was alleged these two men, and many other bookmakers operating in Brisbane and on the Gold Coast, were chief sources of "corrupt payments to police" in the Licensing Branch, a subsection of the Criminal Intelligence Unit. The CIU was a police department "formed to collect, record and disseminate intelligence on organized crime and corruption, and to apprehend and prosecute those involved." In 1975, the results of the trial found neither men guilty and the loss was devastating to the campaign against both corruption and the integrity of the CIU. "The Criminal Intelligence Unit had failed to secure a prosecution in a seemingly iron-clad case-one where money was actually paid over, the vital conversations had been taped and most of the activities had been observed by members of the CIU." This 'cover up' prompted the investigation into police behaviour, resulting in The Lucas Inquiry. Terry O'Gorman said at the National Convention on Civil Liberties, held in 1976, "the conclusions on the Southport Case cast serious doubt on the reliability and integrity of inspectors in the Queensland Police Force."

The Lucas report resulted in findings of significant police misconduct, corruption, assault and proof of police "planting evidence, forging warrants and fabricating confessions." "It made 57 recommendations and spoke of the urgent need to reform the entire criminal law system to help the police and protect the public." One of the reports recommendations were that police interviews be recorded to reduce verballing. The practice of verballing relates to the "putting of damaging remarks into the mouths of suspects during police interrogation" or the "fabrication of evidence." O'Gorman, although praising the recommended introduction of tape recordings during police interviews, was highly critical of the report as there were no police charged with misconduct and many were even promoted. He said "the inquiry has made the comment that here we have these officers who have not only not been proceeded against but a number of the principal offenders have been promoted. What sort of a police force do we have if the upper echelons of the police force are led to believe that mis-deeds will be rewarded by subsequent promotion."

==== The Tertiary Education Assistance Scheme Demonstration ====
On 29 July 1976, over a thousand students from The University of Queensland marched against Australian Government's financial assistance scheme for student, known as the Tertiary Education Scheme in Brisbane's central business district. Those students were on the side of better Federal Tertiary Education Assistance Scheme allowances for students and against the government's decision on Federal education budget cuts. Bjelke-Petersen instructed the police not to grant a permit for the march, and the police stopped the march along Coronation Drive. An officer struck Rose Marie Severin, who was a female student in the head with a baton during the struggle. This was recorded and reported on television that night and gave Severin a complicated time as a public figure regardless of her choice. A student quoted on The Courier-Mail reported that she was not a radical; she was only trying to get out of the situation when she got a crack on the head from behind. QCCL attempted to take legal action on behalf of Severin but she reluctantly dropped the charges because she did not want any more publicity in the middle of university exams so the case did not continue any further.

==== Street Protest Ban of 1977 ====
In September 1977 the Queensland Government introduced a ban on all street protests, resulting in a statewide civil liberties campaign of defiance. This saw two thousand people arrested and fined, with another hundred being imprisoned, at a cost of almost five million dollars to the State Government. Bjelke-Petersen publicly announced on 4 September 1977 that "the day of the political street march is over ... Don't bother to apply for a permit. You won't get one. That's government policy now." The main purposes for the ban appear to have been; 1. To remove a critical forum for mobilizing political pressure from the Anti-nuclear movement in Australia 2. To ensure that shipments of Uranium oxide could continue to be transported from the Mary Kathleen mine to Brisbane and further loaded onto overseas bound vessels without disruption from demonstrators 3. To provide Bjelke-Petersen with a law and order issue for the upcoming state elections. Under the old Traffic Act, if an applicant was refused a permit to march by the issuing authority, they would be able to appeal to the magistrate. Instead, the new laws sent all appeals to the police commissioner which resulted in appeals not being passed. In response to this, protesters came up with the idea of Phantom Civil Liberties Marches where protesters would gather and march until the police and media arrived. They would then disperse, and gather together again until the media and police returned, repeating the process over and over again.

==== Censorship into the 1980s ====
In the lead up to the 1980s Queensland fell subject to many forms of censorship. In 1977 things had escalated from prosecutions and book burnings, under the introduction of the Literature Board of Review, to the statewide ban on protests and street marches. Despite the banning of marches in Queensland, numbers involved with the QCCL and similar protest groups continued to rise. Although the State Government felt that it was doing the right thing for Queenslanders, the QCCL argued that 'it is precisely these 'mob [protesters]' who got Australia out of the war in Vietnam; who stopped relations with South Africa sport; and are now joining with and broadening the trade union opposition to Fraser's uranium policy.' Since the formation of the QCCL tens of thousands of people got involved in rallies, pickets, and abortive and secret marches for civil liberties in nearly all of Queensland's major cities. This led to over 2000 people being arrested and some 4500 charges being given by police, despite the innumerable protest applications, all but one were denied.

Throughout the late 1970s, more and more publications were banned reaching almost a hundred per year. In 1974 the Queensland Literature Board said that 'the prohibition of this material has nothing to do with the freedom of the individual to read... The pedlar, however, of all this whether he emerges from the lavatory of some gilded lair, must be restrained from using the magnificent services of printing, publication and distribution to present to all of us (and there is none of us immune to these depravities), the degradation of humans taking their sex as animals.' In 1978 the Full Court of Queensland convicted Forum magazine for its use of offensive language and the claims to dispel public ignorance in sexual matters. Strangely enough the very next year when the Australian versions of Penthouse and Playboy hit the stands, the Board did not instantly ban them. It wasn't until 1982 that Australian Playboy was banned. By this stage Queenslanders had begun to question the legitimacy of the board, even going so far as to call it an embarrassment to the state.

Women's rights

Abortion was a topic which divided and concerned the early QCCL and meant that the many inquiries they received were passed onto Women's clinics. The council was pro-choice.

In 1976, a recommendation was made by the Federal Royal Commission on Human Relationships to support the right for a woman to terminate an unwanted pregnancy. The Councils Abortion Sub-Committee and Dr Janet Irwin presented an Abortion policy to the council's meeting. The policy was revised and amended to note that considerations must be given to the foetus as a potential human being, this version was accepted. "The report stated that abortion was a health services that should be provided along with family planning, that a woman was the one best qualified to make the decision for herself about abortion, and that amendment should be made to the Criminal Code to enable abortions to be carried out by a registered medical practitioner or a person acting under the supervision and authority of a registered medical practitioner".

However, as the Government's Pregnancy Termination Control Bill contained extensive restrictions and penalties for abortion, the demonstration against abortion legislation was held in 1980. Women who claimed for their right to make their decision about abortion participated against the Bill for a violation of civil rights and discrimination against women. Members of Children by Choice, an organisation for women who believe they have rights to make a choice to have an abortion, welcomed to have civil libertarians at the demonstration.

The Council worked to prohibit discrimination of women in the workplace on many issues; marital status, pregnancy, breastfeeding and sexual harassment and discrimination. The Federal Discrimination Act of 1984 worked to assist the International Labour Organization's convention for the Elimination of All Forms of Discrimination.

==== Domestic violence ====
The issue of domestic violence was addressed some 20 years into the establishment of the QCCL, who held a public meeting on the issue in 1989. The Domestic Violence (Family Protection) Act 1989 aimed to prevent violence between married partners or de factos. The council made a submission in reference to the increased police powers proposed by the Act as they were concerned about the increase in police powers and the use of weapons. A Weapons Bill was introduced in 1990 and QCCL President Terry O'Gorman said "The Weapons Bill struck the correct balance between gun ownership and use on the one hand … and the crying imperative to do something positive about the unnecessary loss of life which has flowed from the ability of the disturbed or violent to buy a gun today .. and kill a stranger or a loved one tomorrow". The council has since supported the amendments of The Domestic Violence Act to ban offenders from possessing guns while they were under a Protection Order.

In 2012 the Domestic and Family Violence Protection Act was amended to reflect contemporary understandings of domestic and family violence. Examples of relationships that fall under the new act are same-sex relationships & "one night stands" where a child is produced.

Rights of prostitutes

The QCCL addresses the issue of sex discrimination and many other issues relative to women's rights in prostitution. In 1991, The council made a submission to the Criminal Justice Commission to have prostitution decriminalised on the basis that it was a waste of police resources, saying the law was hypocritical and expressing that a connection existed between the criminalisation of prostitution and police corruption.

Following the submission, the CJC released a report 'Regulating Morality – An Inquiry into Prostitution into Queensland' suggesting a three-year trial of the decriminalisation of prostitution and the move to brothels in Queensland. However, the Prostitution Laws Amendment Act 1992 was passed without the inclusion of any of the CJC's recommendations, as the government stated that these recommendations would prove "costly and unworkable."

The Act banned brothels, a prostitute's ability to legally advertise their services and red-light districts which meant that prostitutes were forced to walk the streets to gather work. Terry O'Gorman stated in his 1992 Presidents Report that the 1992 Act would have negative health consequences on those who worked in the sex industry and an increase in police powers.

The Councils continued rallying, creating of submissions and discussions with government officials resulted in the provision of the Prostitution Act 1999. The Act created the State's first legal boutique brothels which could be legally established by a person with no criminal convictions in commercial or industrial areas, have a maximum of five rooms and which could employ two to ten staff. The 1999 Act proved effective for The Queensland Sex Industry and Terry O'Gorman stated in an interview in 2005 with the ABC, on Tasmania's re-working of the Sex Industry Offences Act,"What the Tasmanian Parliament have got to do is look at other models that have worked well in Australia, particularly the Queensland model, where you've got state approved brothels where prostitution in those circumstances are legal," he said.

==== Sexual Rights ====
In a press release published on 28 October 1989, the QCCL states that a person's sexuality was entirely his or her own business and not the Governments and this view set the tone for the QCCL's involvement in the sexual rights of Queenslanders. In 1976, the Council opposed the Department of Education's decision not to employ a student teacher, despite a contract, due to his sexuality. Their opposition was unsuccessful. In the following years, the Council worked to oppose discriminatory Government action against the gay community. President of the time, Matt Foley found gaps in the amended Liquor Act which forbid hotel licensees to allow drug dealers, sexual perverts, deviants and child molesters on licensed Premises, but failed to define what a 'deviant' was.

QCCL President Steven Keim campaigned against the harassment of the gay community through letters and by enlisting the help of Federal Minister for Foreign Affairs and trade, who wrote a letter to the Queensland Premier, Mike Ahern, urging him to change the laws. The Government refused to comply and as the council was feeling under pressure, the Gay Law Reform Association formed. The Council supported the work of the Association as a more effective way to campaign. Most recently, the Council have supported to gay and lesbian groups in seeking the recognition of single sex relationships. Single sex relationships are recognised in areas such as domestic violence, succession law, and the division of jointly owned property.

==== Terry O'Gorman ====
In 1979, Terry O'Gorman was elected President of the QCCL and served as president up until 1985. He again held presidency from 1990 to 1994. He is currently the Vice President of the QCCL. O'Gorman specialises in criminal law, yet it was the area of Aboriginal Aid in which he first commenced his legal career. An influential member of the QCCL, Gorman stated "it was during the days as a university student and under the rule of Joh Bjelke-Petersen" that he first became aware of the need to protect civil rights. In 2008 O'Gorman commented that "civil liberties on the streets have improved, but the battle has moved to a 'law and order auction' being played out in the media, which used to be centred around the political cycle but now appears to be a permanent fixture."

=== Campaigns and activities: 1982–1986 ===
This was yet another tumultuous period for the QCCL. Another police inquiry began, The Police Complaints Tribunal, and the Commonwealth Games were held in 1982 amongst protests campaigning for Indigenous rights. By 1982, it was now obviously clear to the QCCL that none of the 57 Lucas recommendations had been implemented. More claims of corrupt policing surfaced and any police officer who 'whistle blew' on another police officer would soon find their careers destroyed.

The Police Complaints Tribunal

This tribunal was set up in 1982 and lasted until 1990. It was yet another inquiry into police corruption and also a concerted effort to improve public opinion on accusations of corruption within the police force. The QCCL president at the time, Terry O'Gorman, believed this would be better than the previous inquiry, of "police investigating themselves," although said there would still be the deterrent for persons lodging a complaint as there were limited protections for the complainant against police retaliation. O'Gorman also claimed the PCT "lacked independence, which was confirmed by a damning public revelation of police malpractice which appeared on a Four Corners episode in 1986." In one case a man claimed he was forced to make a full confession to police in response to their "threats to harm his family, and when he lodged a complaint with the PCT, it vindicated the police and totally discredited him."

The Commonwealth Games Act 1982

A demonstration for Aboriginal land rights, marches through Brisbane during the 1982 Commonwealth Games

Street marches were banned during the 1982 Commonwealth Games, allowing police to make arrests to anyone holding a placard or circulating a booklet about any Aboriginal issue near Game venues following by the Government's approval of the Commonwealth Games Act 1982 which would in effect attempt to prevent Aborigines from bringing out Land Right's issues during the Games. Queensland police gave permits to only two marches from the centre of Brisbane to protest rallies at Musgrave Park, Brisbane before the Games. On 26 September 1982, the day the Games commenced, nearly 2,000 people marched carrying placards and banners across the Brisbane River and on 29 September, the march was reduced by half. Thirty-nine people were arrested at a demonstration on the opening of the Commonwealth Games and a few days later, police arrested 104 protesters who were charged under the Queensland Government's Commonwealth Games security laws. A further 260 protesters were also arrested within three days of the opening of the Games. However, the demonstration did not stop and continued in Melbourne. Despite the numerous arrests, these protests were considered successful for gaining national and international attention not only about the Indigenous issues but the right to protest peacefully.

=== Campaigns and activities: 1987–2001 ===
This era was another turning point for civil rights in Queensland with the end of a controversial Premier Joh Bjelke-Petersen's reign and the beginning of The Fitzgerald Inquiry. It was not until 1987 that Terry O'Gorman's brother Assistant Police Commissioner Frank O'Gorman implemented the reforms recommended by the Lucas Inquiry in 1977.

==== The Fitzgerald Inquiry ====
The Fitzgerald Inquiry began in 1987 and Tony Fitzgerald, QC, was appointed as its head on 26 May. The inquiry was a turning point in the fight for civil rights and the investigation of police misconduct and corruption. The inquiry was 'sparked' by frequent media talk of corruption by police at the highest level, involving alleged "illegal gambling, prostitution, kickbacks and brown paper bags." Yet it was an episode on Four Corners entitled 'Moonlight State' that ignited the inquiry.

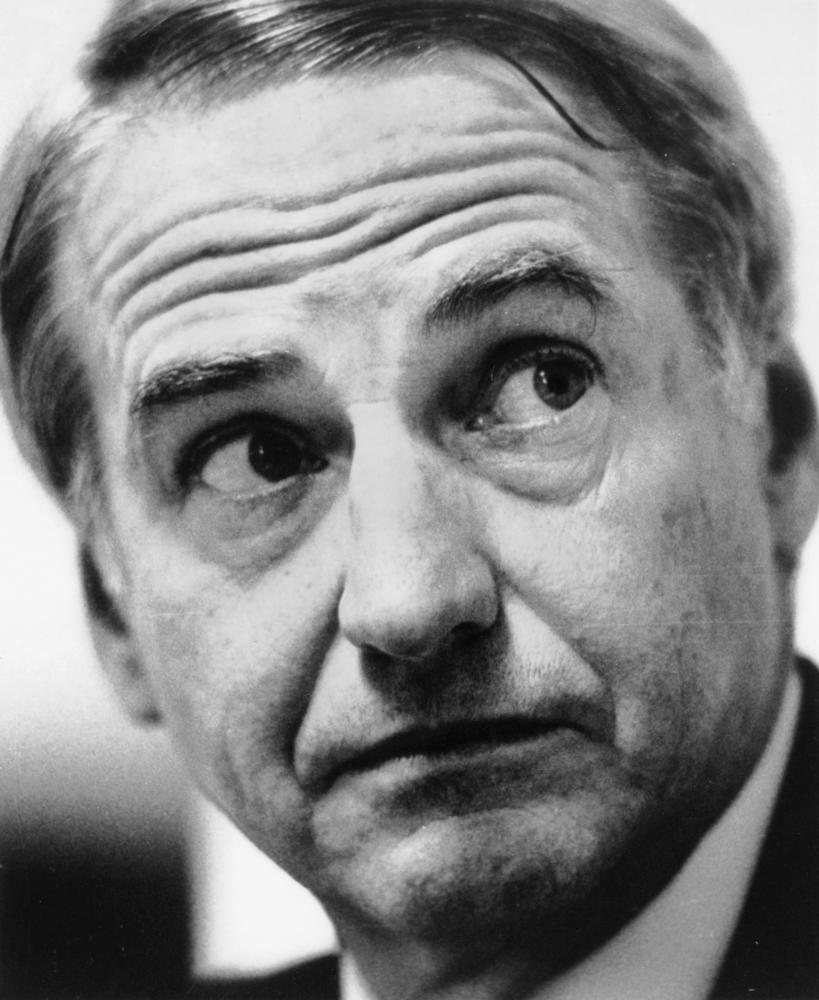
Tony Fitzgerald

The inquiry's objectives were to view "five criminal identities and any corrupt links within the police force over the previous five years."Fitzgerald persuaded the Government to extend the terms of the inquiry to give him the power to investigate any criminal activities and official misconduct by the police. Members of the Council were elated with the inquiry, believing that Fitzgerald was a strong candidate for the role.

The intention of the Fitzgerald report was to "usher in a bold new age of transparency, innovation and integrity in politics and public sector management."Fitzgerald envisioned a model of transparency in government, just elections, and non-corrupt policing through "the elimination of graft and gratuities;the removal of cronyism, nepotism and bias in public service appointments and decisions; and a scientifically grounded criminal justice system focused on crime prevention and progressive law reform."

During the Inquiry, then president of the QCCL Terry O'Gorman cross-examined Joh Bjelke-Petersen, who had attempted to shut down the inquiry unsuccessfully. In 1987, during the process of the Fitzgerald Inquiry, it had become glaringly clear to the National Party that their leader, Bjelke Petersen, was a political liability and he was consequently forced to stand down as Premier on 1 December.

The inquiry lasted two years, heard from 339 witnesses and resulted in over 100 recommendations. Many policies recommended by the council were endorsed in the report. The report and recommendations of the Fitzgerald inquiry were released in July 1989 and exposed evidence that a "corrupt elite were running Queensland – politicians, police and businessmen who were criminally involved in a world of drugs, prostitution and covert deals." "Tony Fitzgerald did not want to be confined to looking just at specific allegations against specific people – he wanted the freedom to look into 'any other matter or thing appertaining to the aforesaid matters', and he did not want to look only at related matters but at any matter whether it related or not. By the time he was finished looking, the police commissioner had toppled, 30 years of National Party Government was all but over, Queensland was fundamentally altered and Fitzgerald, by giving indemnities in return for evidence, had set a new standard for commissions of inquiry." Also after the inquiry there were encouraging reforms that occurred in regards to the legalisation of homosexuality, and a more liberal and regulated approach to gambling.

==== The Criminal Justice Commission ====
Operating from 1989 to 2001, The Criminal Justice Commission was a permanent institution designed to assist the implementation of the recommended reforms in the Fitzgerald Inquiry. The Criminal Justice Commissions "is empowered under the Criminal Justice Act to investigate all cases of alleged or suspected misconduct by members of the Police Service that come to its notice from any source, including information from an anonymous source." The CJC called for the abolishment of the Police Special Branch which held files on individuals who had shown lawful opposition toward government policies, as well as many other reforms in the past. The QCCL's O'Gorman did not approve of the destruction of these files, until those who the files concerned, i.e. those who had participated in anti-government protests, were able to access the files themselves. One of the council's primary concerns was "that the CJC had broad investigative powers overriding many basic protections which citizens had been entitled to in law."For example, "the Council believed that names should not be published in CJC reports because the publication of such names with respect to findings clearly had the potential to damage individuals reputations, and prejudice any criminal proceeding that might follow."

In 1997 police 'move on' powers were introduced by the Government of Queensland which effectively gave police the power to 'move people on' from, "prescribed places such as shops, schools, licensed premises, railway station or shopping mall. The CMC states "police essentially have the power to move people on if they are causing anxiety to another person," yet Terry O'Gorman states "it is a sad fact that in many circumstances certain people will feel threatened by an Aboriginal person, not because of their behaviour but by the very fact that they are Indigenous." O'Gorman argues that "the effect of section 47 of the Act is that police officers are asking themselves, is this person, by the fact of who they are or what they look like, likely to cause anxiety to others and when making this determination, issues of race, apparel, state of cleanliness and social status are likely to come into play and work against minority groups, such as Indigenous Australians."

=== Campaigns and activities: 2002–2011 ===
Since 2001, the QCCL kept a close watch on the new police corruption commission, the Crime and Misconduct Commission, as well as drug driving and privacy laws.

==== The Crime and Misconduct Commission ====
This was a new commission formed in 2001, which is still in existence and their objectives are "to combat major crime, to improve the integrity of the Queensland public sector and reduce the incidence of misconduct in this sector." Other responsibilities of this commission are to manage a witness protection scheme. The council has been critical of the CMC. For example, in 2010, the QCCL called for major reforms in the police complaints process after footage was released of Cameron Doomadgee, a man who died in the 2004 Palm Island death in custody. Terry O'Gorman said the system had failed as the CMC came to the conclusion that the officers being investigated over the incident "were unprofessional and part of a self- protecting police culture." The Queensland Council for Civil Liberties is linked to the CMC as it is expected in many cases to "assume responsibility for ensuring the CMC review is not rushed or poorly deliberated and it is only through such proactive work that the discriminatory nature of this legislation will be sufficiently revealed.

==== Difficult Rights ====
Protecting citizen privacy has been at the forefront of the Council's negotiations since their founding. The Council's job has been made more difficult since the introduction of social media sites and generally platforms where a person's privacy could be jeopardised.

Also protecting the rights of criminals and in particular, the civil rights of sex offenders is an example of the difficult space the Council works in. In a recent article, following convicted child molester Dennis Ferguson's placement in Murgon, the Australian Council for Civil Liberties stated that the government must provide child molesters some form of protection from community uproar, attacks and generally restricting an individual's civil liberties.

The council spoke out in 2009 over the controversial 'drug driving' laws being introduced arguing that they breach one's civil liberties and that there will be an extension of police powers that accompany this.

In 2010 protesters in opposition to coal-seam gas mining took to the streets of Brisbane and complained of police officers taking unauthorised photos of them and asking for their contact details. QCCL president Michael Cope said at the time "police taking photos was an invasion of privacy and entirely unacceptable" and was similar to the days of Bjelke-Petersens reign when photos were taken of protesters and kept within government files.

On 13 September 2010, QCCL president Michael Cope commented in The Courier-Mail on Brisbane lawyer, Alexander Stewart, who posted a YouTube video of himself smoking pages from the Bible and the Koran. The man appears to be smoking a green 'marijuana' type substance and says of the incident, "It's just a f—ing book. Who cares? It's your beliefs that matter. Quite frankly, if you are going to get upset about a book, you're taking life way too seriously." Cope commented on the event saying "I don't think on the face of it that what he's done is an offense nor do we think it should be". He said he did not believe that the anti-discrimination Act had been breached and also that "penalties had been removed from the Criminal Code for blasphemy."

=== Campaigns and activities: 2012–present ===
In 2012, Terry O'Gorman spoke out against Queensland Premier Campbell Newman's announcement he will be introducing jail terms for the possession of illegal firearms and trafficking weapons. In addition, the state government is looking into repealing "Labors Criminal Organisation Act, where associating with members or declared organisations" will be illegal. This has been compared to the laws which Joh Bjelke-Petersen enacted in his reign and has been described as an "anti association law, rather than an anti-bikie law," and therefore affecting one's civil liberties. The QCCL are watching developments closely.

The council is also looking into the introduction of body scans at Australian airports. This is where full body scan machines at airports of which random members are selected to go through and allows screeners to detect non-metallic devices, objects and weapons concealed on a person's body, but they also reveals body outlines, organs and genitals. The Queensland Council for Civil Liberties has opposed their use, calling them "a virtual strip search." The council is concerned about the impact of this equipment on citizens rights to privacy and has made several submissions to the state and federal Government on this particular issue.

== Presidents ==
Each president of the Queensland Council for Civil Liberties has dedicated significant personal time and energy into the survival and success of this council. Individually, they each contributed by carrying out the work of the council, running meetings, raising funds and increasing membership. A number of Presidents and Vice Presidents have gone on to be selected for judicial appointments.

The presidents are as follows:

- Jim Kelly 1966–1973
- Lew Wyvill 1973–1975
- Derek Fielding 1975–1979
- Terry O'Gorman 1979–1985, 1990–1994
- Matt Foley 1985–1987
- Stephen Keim 1987–1990
- Ian Dearden 1994–2005
- Michael Cope 2005–present

Website: http://qccl.org.au

Facebook: https://www.facebook.com/QCCLonline

== See also ==
- Behind the Banana Curtain - (compilation music album)
- Brisbane punk rock
- Pig City
- The Cane Toad Times
- Reason Party (Australia)
