= Anne Jones (writer) =

Australian writer (born 1955)

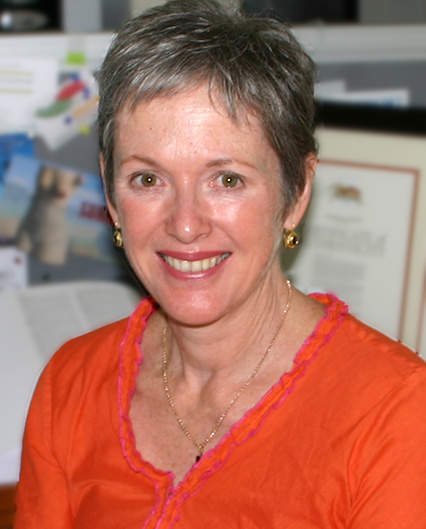
Anne Jones at the offices of ToadShow in 2011.

Anne Patricia Jones (born 28 July 1955) is an Australian writer, editor, and administrator. She was a company director, managing partner and company chair of ToadShow Pty Ltd, a Brisbane-based design company. In 1981, she was co editor of Semper Floreat the University of Queensland student newspaper.

In 1982 and 1983, she was station coordinator of 4ZZZ. In 1983, she co-founded, with Damien Ledwich and Matt Mawson, the second version of The Cane Toad Times. In 1986, she was a trainee writer with P. P. Cranney on the play Sweeping Statements, about the Federated Miscellaneous Workers Union, produced by Street Arts. Also in 1986, under the name ToadShow, she administered the production of Hound of Music at the Princess Theatre, in Brisbane, Queensland.

In 1998, Jones was a candidate for the Queensland-based seat of Maranoa.

In 1999, she was appointed to the board of the Queensland Museum and served as Chair of the Queensland Museum board from 2002 to 2008. She was awarded the Queensland Museum Medal in 2009. In 2010, she became an Ambassador of the Queensland Museum, a role in the Queensland Museum Foundation. In 2011, a spider species, Opopaea jonesae, was named after her in recognition of her service to the museum.

In 2011, Jones was appointed to the board of Healthy Waterways now known as Healthy Land & Water, a not-for-profit membership-based organisation working to protect and improve waterway health in South East Queensland.
