= Murder of Allison Baden-Clay =

Murder of Australian woman

Allison Baden-Clay
- Born: Allison June Dickie; 1 July 1968; Corinda, Queensland, Australia
- Died: 19 April 2012 (aged 43)
- Cause of death: Homicide
- Spouse: Gerard Robert Baden-Clay (1997–2012; her death)
- Children: 3

Allison June Baden-Clay (née Dickie; 1 July 1968 – 19 April 2012) was murdered by her husband, Gerard Baden-Clay in a premeditated act on 19 April 2012. Allison was an Australian woman, mother of three daughters aged 11 and under, and a business executive. Her body was discovered on 30 April 2012, ten days after she was reported missing by her husband, Gerard. On 13 June 2012, Gerard was charged with murder and interfering with a corpse. On 15 July 2014, he was found guilty of murder, with the other charge being dropped; Gerard was given a life sentence. Gerard appealed the conviction and, on 8 December 2015, these charges were downgraded to manslaughter. In August 2016, the High Court of Australia re-instated the murder conviction.

== Background ==
On 23 August 1997, Allison June Dickie married Gerard Robert Baden-Clay, who had been born in Bournemouth, England, United Kingdom on 9 September 1970. In 1971, Gerard's family had migrated from Zambia to Rhodesia, where they changed their family name from Clay to Baden-Clay to associate the family with his paternal great-grandfather, Lord Baden-Powell of Scouting fame. In 1980, the Baden-Clay family migrated to Australia. After leaving school, Gerard trained in accountancy, and then worked for Flight Centre in Brisbane, where Allison was a colleague.

At the time of Allison's death in 2012, the couple were on diverging financial paths. Allison had become an executive for Flight Centre, but Gerard, who had been running a successful up-market real estate franchise since 2004, was struggling following the disastrous Brisbane floods. The couple lived in a rented house in Brookfield, Queensland, along with their three daughters aged 10 and under. In October 2011, Allison learned of a long-standing affair her husband was having with an employee at his business. At the time of her disappearance Allison's life was insured for more than A$800,000.

== Disappearance and discovery ==
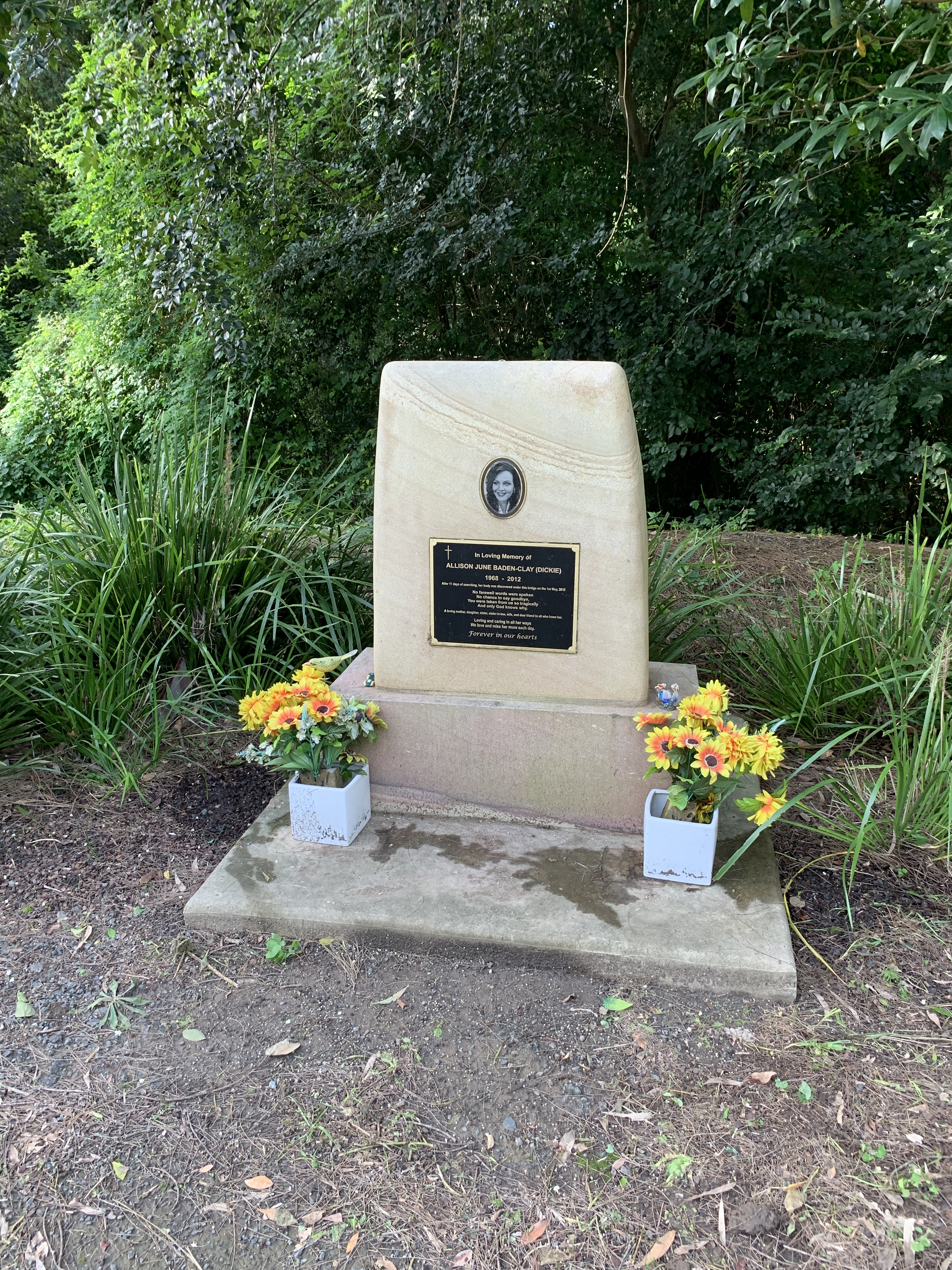
Memorial to Allison Baden-Clay, beside Kholo Creek where her body was found, 2024

At 7:14 am on Friday, 20 April 2012, Gerard reported Allison missing. He claimed she sometimes went for a walk at 5am and assumed she had done so that morning. She was always back in time for their daughters' breakfast, and he became concerned when she had not returned home.

Gerard appeared on national TV appealing for Allison's safe return during her disappearance, which initially drew suspicion among members of the public.

On 30 April, a woman's body was found by a canoeist at Kholo Creek, Anstead, about 13 kilometres (8.1 mi) from the Baden-Clay home in Brookfield. The following day, the body was confirmed to be Allison. Her funeral was held in Ipswich on 11 May. The autopsy report stated that the cause of death could not be determined.

== Trial and conviction ==
On 13 June 2012, Gerard was formally interviewed at Indooroopilly police station and charged with Allison's murder and for interfering with her corpse. He maintained his innocence and said he would "be strenuously defending the charges". Gerard's bail application was denied on 22 June because Justice David Boddice said he posed a "significant flight risk".

The trial began in the Brisbane Supreme Court on 10 June 2014. Gerard pleaded not guilty to the charges. On 15 July, he was found guilty of murdering Allison. He was given a life sentence with a non-parole period of fifteen years. The charge of interfering with a corpse was dropped.

== Defence appeal ==
On 7 August 2015, Gerard appealed his conviction to the Queensland Court of Appeal. On 8 December, his conviction was downgraded to manslaughter, on the ground that the evidence at trial was not able to exclude a reasonable hypothesis that "there was a physical confrontation between [Baden-Clay] and his wife in which he delivered a blow which killed her (for example, by the effects of a fall hitting her head against a hard surface) without intending to cause serious harm".

== Prosecution appeal ==
The decision of the Court of Appeal was controversial. There was a strong public reaction and a large rally was organised calling for an appeal to the High Court of Australia. On 18 December, a crowd estimated at 4,000 people gathered in King George Square in the centre of Brisbane to support the proposal that the decision be appealed. Some members of the legal profession, in turn, were vocal in defending the decision handed down by the Court of Appeal. Prominent Queensland lawyer Terry O'Gorman, for example, said that, "You don't have a murder case or any other case decided by who can yell out loudest in the media" and that "those who don't like it have to cop it because that is the law". However, in an unusual move, the Queensland Director of Public Prosecutions decided to appeal against the downgrade. The following year, on 31 August 2016, more than four years after Allison had died, the High Court of Australia restored the original trial murder conviction.

== Later developments ==
In February 2017, Allison's father was appointed the executor of her estate. It was ruled that Gerard Baden-Clay was not entitled to any benefits from her death.

== Legacy ==
The Allison Baden-Clay Foundation was launched on 31 July 2015. Its aim is to "create a Queensland community that acknowledges the prevalence of domestic and family violence".

In March 2018, the first annual scholarship in Allison's memory for an aspiring ballet dancer was announced by the Queensland premier, Annastacia Palaszczuk, who had known Allison as a child.

== See also ==
- Death of Maria Korp
- List of solved missing person cases (post-2000)
