= Popular Theatre Troupe =

The Popular Theatre Troupe was an agitprop ensemble formed in Brisbane, Queensland in 1974 as part of a radical movement against Premier Joh Bjelke-Petersen's conservative Queensland's government of the day. The troupe toured Australia with a total of 25 original shows between 1974 and 1983. The key players in the ensemble organised ten large community events and were behind many community arts projects.

== Beginnings ==
The Popular Theatre Troupe had its genesis in the meetings Richard Fotheringham called during 1973 to discuss options for the planned 'fringe theatre' for Queensland's first 'Festival of the Arts' directed by Lesley Gotto. Inspirations and influences included Oh, What a Lovely War! and The Legend of King O'Malley. A leader of alternative theatre in Britain, Albert Hunt, was brought out by the University of Queensland's English Department to mentor the group. Their first production was Star Trick, a satire lampooning the Star Trek television series focussing on the absurdity of local Queensland politics interspersed with ironically sung old popular songs.

Geoffrey Milne in Theatre Australia (un)limited: Australian theatre since the 1950s suggests precursors to the Popular Theatre Troupe's type of political theatre included Peter Oysten at Victoria College of the Arts, the San Francisco Mime Troupe and run-of-the-mill communist theatre featured at worker's clubs.

The White Man's Mission (1975) by Richard Fotheringham and Albert Hunt stands out as one of the troupe's strongest scripts. It is reproduced in full in one of the few published texts on Brisbane's political theatre, "Challenging the centre" (1995) edited by Steve Capelin, where it takes up 36 pages about Australian racism, slavery and exploitation. It was invited to the Adelaide Festival in 1976.

== Cultural context ==
Although funded by the Community Arts and Theatre Boards of the Australia Council, the Popular Theatre Troupe received no financial assistance from the Queensland Government. Quite the contrary, as a radical extra-parliamentary opposition, the Popular Theatre Troupe's activities were monitored closely by the Special Branch of the Queensland Police and two of their shows were banned.

The Popular Theatre Troupe were followed by another group, Order By Numbers, which was in some ways an unfunded Popular Theatre Troupe reprise in 1985–86, featuring writers Hugh Watson, Dee Martin, Penny Glass, Kery O'Rourke, Nat Trimarchi and Gavan Fenelon. Order By Numbers and a sister company Teatro Unidad y Liberacion, were administered by an incorporated group called The New Actor's Company. The material for the satires performed were Brisbane cultural and political events, such as the SEQEB Strike in 1985. A Few Short Wicks in Paradise by the ensemble took the side of the striking workers in opposing anti-union laws of the Bjelke-Petersen government. The founding members of Order By Numbers were Dee Martin, Penny Glass, Gavan Fenelon and Nat Trimarchi (who wrote all the songs weaved through the narrative). Hugh Watson and Kerry O'Rourke were involved as writers. Order By Numbers was initially aimed at moving beyond the ‘cartoon style’ agit prop (or ‘illustrated lecture’), with actors playing a version of themselves as a metaphor for what was going on around them. This biting original approach received praise from many quarters but was not developed further.

Overlapping this period was the genesis of Street Arts a community-arts driven theatre company which, unlike Popular Theatre Troupe which was more classically agit-prop in performing for the audience, were interested in creating theatre by enabling the communities suffering disadvantage, through, circus, song, drama and cabaret. Many of the players, thinkers, writers and artists involved were to find homes in Street Arts.

== Key players ==
Key members of the group included writers and directors Errol O'Neill, John Watson, Fiona Winning, Alexandra Black, Kerry O'Rourke, Dee Martin, Bernie Lewis, Hugh Watson, Stephen Stockwell, Richard Fotheringham, Robert Perrier, Doug Anderson and Albert Hunt. However, much writing and directing was done collectively with the performers who included Kathryn Porrill, Therese Collie, Ken MacLeod, Julie Hickson, Michael Cummings, Lynne Samson, Teresa Wilkinson, John Lane, Duncan Campbell, Lindy Morrison, Errol O'Neill, Leah Cotterell, Katrina Deverey, Nat Trimarchi, Gavin Fenelon and Penny Glass.

== England ==
Six members of the group staged an English tour of The White Man's Mission in 1977, assisted by a cash grant from the Arts Council of Great Britain, a minibus from the Calouste Gulbenkian Foundation, and in kind resources from Bradford College Five of those members were, Duncan Campbell, Nick Hughes, Kath Porrill, Janet Mahoney and Micko O'Byrne. The tour received favourable reviews and ran for three weeks in London before doing a regional tour of England.

== Final years ==
Australia Council funding was withdrawn in 1982 and though some members of the company struggled on, it eventually folded in 1983.

== See also ==
https://vimeo.com/388651052?ref=em-share Order By Numbers

- The Cane Toad Times
- Pig City music festival and symposium
- Radical Times Archive
