= Investigating the IOT =

Investigating the IOT was a two-voyage scientific expedition (2021 and 2022) to survey the seafloor and marine biodiversity of Australia's Indian Ocean Territories (IOT), namely Christmas Island and the Cocos (Keeling) Islands. Conducted aboard the CSIRO research vessel RV Investigator, the expedition was described as a world-first biodiversity survey of the region's largely unexplored seamounts.

The expedition was led by Chief Scientist Dr Tim O'Hara of Museums Victoria Research Institute, with Professor Shane Ahyong, Head of Marine Invertebrates at the Australian Museum, serving as co-Principal Investigator. Data collected during the voyages were intended to support the management of new marine parks established around the territories in March 2022.

== Background ==
The seamounts surrounding Christmas Island and the Cocos (Keeling) Islands, some rising more than 4,000 metres above the seafloor and up to 70 kilometres in diameter, had remained largely unexplored prior to the expedition despite being detectable via satellite altimetry. Most of the seamounts date to the late Cretaceous period, 65–80 million years ago, and were considered likely to harbour ancient, endemic communities.

== Voyages ==
=== 2021 voyage (IN2021_V04) ===
RV Investigator departed Darwin on 30 June 2021, travelling via Christmas Island and the Cocos (Keeling) Islands before arriving in Fremantle, Western Australia, on 13 August 2021 – a 45-day, 13,000 km voyage. The voyage involved researchers from CSIRO, the Australian National Fish Collection, the Australian Museum, the Western Australian Museum, the South Australian Museum, and Museums Victoria Research Institute. Scientists conducted more than 200 biodiversity surveys and used the vessel's sonar systems to produce new high-resolution seafloor maps.

=== 2022 voyage (IN2022_V08) ===
A second voyage in November 2022 completed the survey begun in 2021, again sailing from Darwin to Fremantle via the two island territories. The voyage was led by Museums Victoria Research Institute in collaboration with CSIRO, Parks Australia, and Bush Blitz.

== Findings ==
Multibeam sonar mapping during the two voyages mapped 11 seamounts for the first time and extended existing mapping for a further 23, including the Muirfield Seamount, which summits just 17 metres below sea level. Researchers also identified a large extinct caldera, informally nicknamed the "Eye of Sauron", located southeast of Christmas Island at a depth of 3,100–3,700 metres, and a circular volcanic crater south of the Cocos (Keeling) Islands.

Biological sampling recovered numerous previously undescribed species. A 2024 taxonomic study in the Records of the Australian Museum described more than 150 specimens of the polychaete family Serpulidae collected during the voyages, including a new genus, Bathyvermiloides.

== Participating institutions ==
- CSIRO (Marine National Facility)
- Museums Victoria Research Institute
- Australian Museum Research Institute
- Western Australian Museum
- South Australian Museum
- Parks Australia
- Bush Blitz

== See also ==
- RV Investigator
- Australian Indian Ocean Territories
