= Behind the Banana Curtain =

2000 compilation album

Compilation album by Various Artists
- Recorded: 2000
- Genre: Various genres
- Label: Valve Records

Behind the Banana Curtain is a compilation album released by Australian radio station 4ZZZ. It is a 2 disc set that documents 25 years of 4ZZZ broadcasting and their contribution to Brisbane's music scene.

== Track listing ==
Disc One

1. (I'm) Stranded – The Saints
2. Karen – The Go-Betweens
3. Task Force – Razar
4. Cigarettes and Alcohol – The Leftovers
5. Sunset Strip – The Riptides
6. Help – The Apartments
7. Savage – The Fun Things
8. Crazy Eddie – Xero
9. Brisbane Blacks – Mop and the Dropouts
10. Buzzsaw Popstar – The Vampire Lovers
11. Black Banned – Mystery of Sixes
12. Blue Shirt – The Colours
13. Igloo – The Screaming Tribesmen
14. Alice D – Lovs e Blur
15. Summer Vacation – Presidents Eleven
16. Pig City – The Parameters
17. SEQEB Scabs – La Fetts
18. Winter Moving In – Post No Bills
19. The Living Kind – Ups and Downs
20. Too Much Acid – Pineapples from the Dawn of Time
21. Cyclone Hits Expo – Choo Dikka Dikka
22. Death Row Road – Hotel Breslin

Disc Two

1. Harold & Maude – Batswing Saloon
2. Another World – Purple Avengers
3. Chill Out America – Chopper Division
4. Creatures Downstairs – Girly
5. Dreamkillers – Dreamkillers
6. Boy's Germs – Gravel Rash
7. V8 Rock 'n' Roll – Blowhard
8. Children – Acid World
9. Treat Yourself Gently – Isis
10. Fantastic Plastic – Custard
11. Dreaming – Wishing Chair
12. I Believe – Toothfaeries
13. Mudpool Goddess – Blood Party
14. Drew Romance – The Melniks
15. Dart – Screamfeeder
16. Fish and Chip Bitch from Ipswich – Escape from Toytown
17. The Day You Come – Powderfinger
18. Not From There – Sich Offnen
19. I Wanna Be a Nudist – Regurgitator

== See also ==
- Brisbane punk rock
- The Cane Toad Times
- Pig City music festival and symposium
- Street Arts Community Theatre Company
