= Isis (Australian band) =

ISIS was an independent, feminist folk band from Brisbane, Australia, together from 1991 to 1998. During their time together, the band became relatively well known within the Brisbane music scene. The band was founded by Lucinda Shaw and Toni Lawson, joined by Rozi Pizzey. Their first self-titled album also had input from Shaw's brother Wendall Shaw.

Brett Collery and James Lees joined for the band's second album "Ooze" (released in 1995). In 1996, the band released a third CD "Missionary And Other Positions" and in 1997 they went on a national tour.

At the start of 1998 the members wanted to pursue other projects and the band broke up. They did a farewell show on Valentine's Day at The Zoo in Brisbane.

The band members all went on to several other projects, Collery to Gotacola and then into the world of theatre sound design and composition, Lawson and Pizzey went on to collaborate on a short-lived project Snatch and then formed acoustic act Precious Lazy Day. Shaw founded experimental group Shugafix (later called Silver Circus) and Lees helped form Saturn South with Collery.

The band reformed by invitation in 2000 for 4ZZZ's 25th birthday, doing two shows. ISIS also made brief appearances at special events at renowned venue The Zoo in 2002 and in 2004.

In 2006, Pizzey returned to live performance with a new version of Precious Lazy Day, and since 2021 has been releasing music independently under the moniker 'LoneRose'. Lees and Shaw started collaborating on new material in 2007 under the (slightly renamed) moniker Silver Sircus and released two EP's in 2008 and an album in 2012.

The band reformed briefly in December 2012 to perform a 20-minute set, by invitation, at The Zoo to celebrate the venue's 20th Birthday along with fellow Brisbane artists including Katie & Tyrone Noonan, Regurgitator, Toothfaeries, Fabulous Nobodies, Paddy Dempsey, Tylea and Danny Widdicombe.

== Discography ==
- Isis, self-titled EP, 1995
- OOZE EP (1995)
- Missionary and Other Positions, EP 1996
- Repositions, remixes by various others of the band's tracks, 1998

=== Compilations ===
- This Is ISIS – 2000, compilation of material 1994–1998
- Treat Yourself Gently on Behind the Banana Curtain double CD, 4ZZZ sampler of classic Brisbane music
