= Robert Whyte =

Australian scientist, writer and editor (b1955)

Robert Whyte (born 1955, in Melbourne) is an Australian writer. He was a founding co-owner and director of the Brisbane-based multimedia firm ToadShow. After 2012 he participated in the Australian Government's new species exploration program Bush Blitz. His works include The Creek in Our Back Yard: a practical guide to creek restoration (2011) and A Field Guide to Spiders of Australia for CSIRO Publishing 2017.

== Biography ==
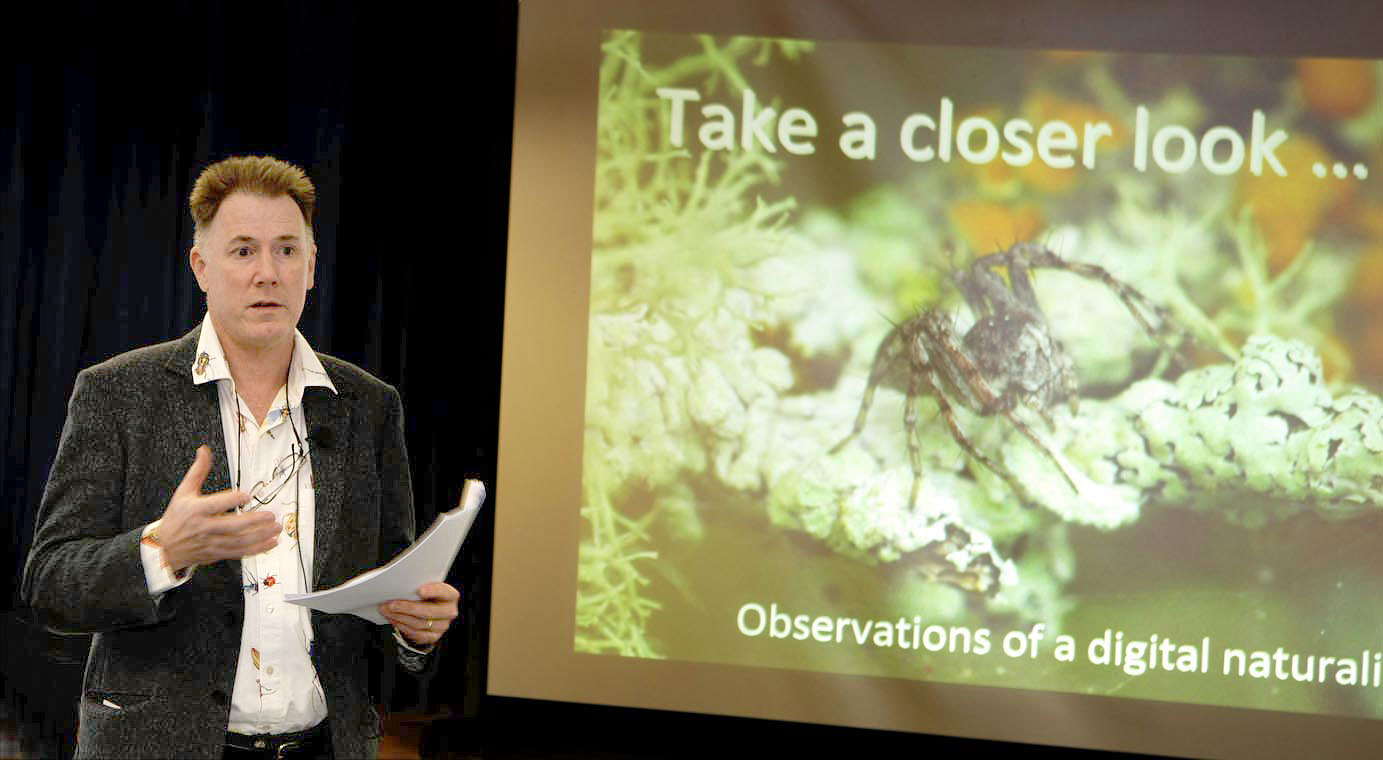
Robert Whyte delivering a paper on invertebrate biodiversity Photo: Mark Crocker at the Brisbane City Council's 2010 Biodiversity Forum

Robert Whyte was born in Melbourne in 1955. His family moved to Brisbane in 1957.

In 1976 he was awarded a One Year Young Writer's Fellowship by the Literature Board of the Australia Council for the Arts.

In 1981 he completed a Postgraduate Diploma in Professional Art Studies at Alexander Mackie CAE (now University of Western Sydney), and was a contributor to Sydney art magazine Art Network.

In 1985 he undertook the production of Environment Victoria, the magazine of the Conservation Council of Victoria, now Environment Victoria. In 1987 he was founding co-editor of contemporary art magazine Eyeline with Sarah Follent and Graham Coulter-Smith.

Robert Whyte was a co-owner of ToadShow, a multimedia firm in Brisbane, Queensland. As a web designer he was responsible for Brisbane Stories a collection of web sites revealing stories of hidden Brisbane featuring art, environment and history.

Robert Whyte was an editor of The Cane Toad Times from 1985 to 1990. Between 2002 and 2019 he undertook habitat restorations projects in South East Queensland. In 2011 his book The creek in our backyard: A practical guide for landholders was published, an expanded second edition appearing in 2013 A field guide to the spiders of Australia for CSIRO Publishing was released 1 June 2017.

== Bush Blitz ==
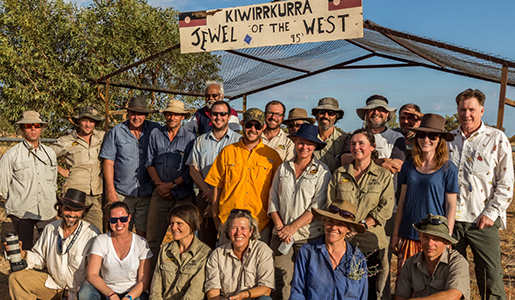
Robert Whyte far right with the Bush Blitz team in Kiwirrkurra Indigenous Protected Area Gibson Desert WA.

Robert Whyte participated in the Australian Government's new species exploration program Bush Blitz from 2012's Fish River Bush Blitz, as a scientist specialising in spiders and as a scientific photographer. In 2013 he attended the Henbury Station Bush Blitz in the Northern Territory. In 2014 he participated as scientist and photographer at the Home Valley Bush Blitz in The Kimberly, Western Australia and in 2015 participated in the Kiwirrkurra IPA Bush Blitz in the Gibson Desert in Western Australia. In 2017 he attended the Bush Blitz, in Quinkan Country inland from Cooktown on Cape York Peninsula, where he photographed and filmed live spiders discovered on the trip.

In September 2018 Robert Whyte’s discovered 37 new spider species leading the spider team as part of the fauna, flora and fungi stocktake led by John Sinclair of the Fraser Island Defenders Organisation in conjunction with Cooloola Coast Care.

== A Field Guide to Spiders of Australia ==
Whyte and Anderson's A Field Guide to Spiders of Australia was published in 2017 by CSIRO Publishing (with foreword by Tim Low). The News Network news.com.au report on "Five reasons why you shouldn't be afraid of spiders" was based on the content of the book. On 4 May 2018 Robert Whyte appeared on Gardening Australia as a “My Garden Path” presenter, explaining the link between spider diversity and healthy gardens.

== Publishing ==
In 2019 Whyte started a new venture called h.a.r.p.o. (How About Resisting Powerful Organisations) to publish books featuring Brisbane, especially Brisbane Noir.

== Books ==
- Negative thinking, Brisbane, Planet Press, 1976, [64]p., Limited edition of 500 copies, ISBN 0908193025
- Manacles, Melbourne, Melbourne Paragraph of the Senate of Pataphysical Representatives, 1985
- From inside the asylum, South Sydney, Brou Ha Ha Books, 1980, [18] p., ISBN 0959321306
- The creek in our backyard: a practical guide for habitat restoration, Second edition revised and expanded June 2013. Save Our Waterways Now Inc, 2013 59 pages, colour illustrations, colour map, colour portraits ISBN 9780646902142
- A field guide to spiders of Australia, by Whyte, Robert, 1955, and Anderson, Greg Clayton, Vic., CSIRO Publishing, 2017 ISBN 9780643107076

== Taxonomy papers ==
- Australian jumping spiders of the genus Hypoblemum (Araneae: Salticidae: Euophryini) Peckhamia 180.1
- A new peacock spider from the Cape York Peninsula (Araneae: Salticidae: Euophryini: Maratus Karsch 1878). Peckhamia 177.1: 1-6.
- Revision of eastern Australian ant-mimicking spiders of the genus Myrmarachne (Araneae, Salticidae) reveals a complex of species and forms
- The first described male Tube-web Spider for mainland Australia: Ariadna kiwirrkurra sp. Nov. (Araneae: Segestriidae)
- The Peacock Spiders (Araneae: Salticidae: Maratus) of the Queensland Museum, including six new species
- Biodiversity discovery program Bush Blitz yields a new species of goblin spider, Cavisternum attenboroughi (Araneae: Oonopidae), from the Northern Territory
- Biodiversity discovery program bush blitz supplies missing ant spider females (araneae: Zodariidae) from Victoria
