= The Cane Toad Times =

Australian magazine

Cane Toad Times
- Categories: Humour
- Frequency: Quarterly
- Founded: 1977
- First issue: May 1977
- Country: Australia
- Based in: Brisbane, Queensland
- ISSN: 0155-7157

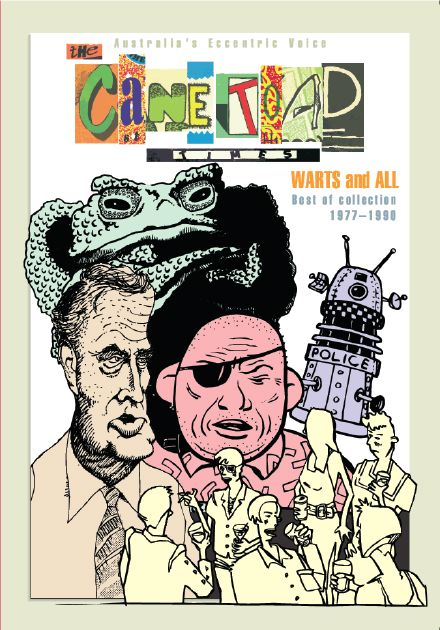
The Cane Toad Times Warts and All Best of Collection 1977–1990 front cover: compiled by Matt Mawson with illustrations by Damien Ledwich, Matt Mawson, Sasha Middleton, Bill Thorpe, Dave Tyrer

The Cane Toad Times was a satirical humour magazine based in Brisbane, Queensland, Australia. It was first published in the late 1970s, then revived under the same name by a new team from 1983 to 1990. It was relaunched in October 2024 as paper publication, sold online and in some Brisbane stores.

The two versions shared personnel and featured roughly the same counter-cultural philosophy, irreverent journalism, strident opinion and fondness for satire, cartoons and popular culture. The editors and contributors of The Cane Toad Times were motivated by opposition to political events and attitudes in Queensland under the Bjelke-Petersen Government (1968–1987).

The first issue of The Cane Toad Times was published in May 1977 and thereafter more or less quarterly, with 22 issues divided between two collectives. The first collective (1977–1979) produced 7 issues, while the second collective (1983–1990) produced a total of 15 issues.

== First collective (1977–1979) ==
The first edition appeared in May 1977 — the year of the Silver Jubilee of Elizabeth II, punk rock and the Sex Pistols’ "God Save The Queen’". The first cover featured a cane toad wearing the British royal crown. Originally a stapled quarterfold, the magazine assumed its eventual tabloid size by the fourth issue. "Cane Toad Times" was chosen as the name of the magazine because the founders wanted a mascot that represented Queensland ... part of the appeal of the toad was the element of repulsion it evoked, the feeling of fear and loathing that typified being young in the Bjelke-Petersen era.

Key writers in the original collective included John Jiggens, David Richards, Gerard Lee, Mirtek Pasciezny, Bing Di Mucci, Craig Munro, Bill Thorpe, Sue McLeod, Janice Knopke and Landon Watts. They teamed up with a group of cartoonists who produced 4ZZZ-FM's "Radio Times": Matt Mawson, Terry Murphy, Damien Ledwich and Ross Hinckley. Later additions to the collective included Flark March, Tim Low, Robbie Wyatt and Lillian Rosser.

Funds were raised by selling advertisements to local businesses in the counter-cultural scene and benefits featuring Brisbane bands including Razar, The Go-Betweens and The Riptides.

The editions of the first collective, not numbered at the time, were:

1. The Royal Cane Toad (May 1977)
2. The Cane Toad goes to Mullumbimby (July 1977)
3. Giant Mutant Cane Toad (Sept/Oct 1977)
4. The Incredible Peanut (December 1977)
5. The Phantoad cover (April 1978)
6. From Behind the Peanut Curtain: Joh, Howard the Duck and Cane Toad (June 1978)
7. Juvenile Delinquency (June 1979)

The first collective folded after a look-alike news magazine, Time Off, with Matt Mawson doing layout, appeared in 1978.

While the magazine's main focus was satire of Premier Joh Bjelke-Petersen's government and the Queensland Police, it also featured aspects of Queensland popular culture including giant roadside attractions, local speedway heroes, "banana worship".

== Second collective (1983–1990) ==
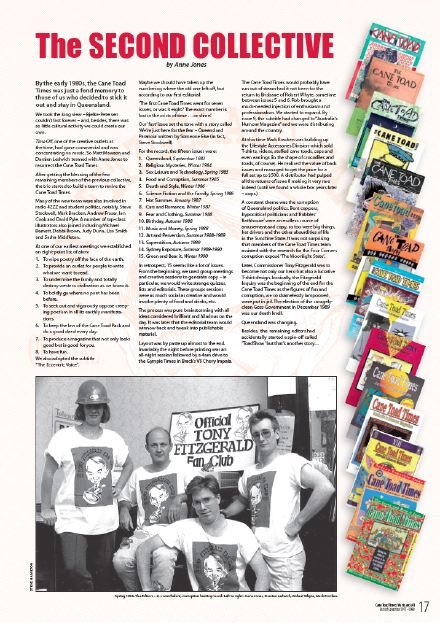
Page 17 of The Cane Toad Times Warts and All Best of Collection 1977–1990. The photo features editors of the Cane Toad Times in 1988 with Tony Fitzgerald fan club T-shirts. Photo: Steve Hamilton, from The Cane Toad Times archives. From left Anne Jones, Damien Ledwich, Robert Whyte, Mark Bracken.

In 1983, while working at the University of Queensland student newspaper Semper Floreat, Matt Mawson and Damien Ledwich teamed with Anne Jones to resurrect The Cane Toad Times. After getting the blessing of the few remaining members of the previous collective, the trio started to build a new group of contributors, many of whom were also involved in radio 4ZZZ and student politics, notably, Stephen Stockwell, Mark Bracken, Andrew Fraser, Ian Cook and David Pyle. A number of top-class illustrators also joined including Michael Barnett, Debbi Brown, Judy Dunn, Lisa Smith and Sasha Middleton. At this time The Cane Toad Times adopted the subtitle: "The Eccentric Voice".

The fifteen issues of the second incarnation of The Cane Toad Times were:

1. Queensland, September 1983
2. Religious Mysteries, Winter 1984
3. Sex Leisure and Technology, Spring 1985
4. Food and Corruption, Summer 1985
5. Death and Style, Winter 1986
6. Science Fiction and the Family, Spring 1986
7. Hot Summer, January 1987
8. Cars and Romance, Winter 1987
9. Fear and Clothing, Summer 1988
10. Birthday, Autumn 1988
11. Music and Money, Spring 1988
12. Art and Perversion, Summer 1988–1989
13. Superstition, Autumn 1989
14. Sydney Exposure, Summer 1989–1990
15. Green and Bear it, Winter 1990

The return of editor Robert Whyte to Brisbane in 1985 sometime between issues 5 and 6 brought a much-needed injection of enthusiasm and professionalism. By issue 9, the subtitle had changed to "Australia’s Humour Magazine" and distribution went Australia-wide. Continuing themes included the corruption of Queensland politics, Big Things, hat-wearing drivers and the other absurdities of life in 'The Sunshine State'.

Simon Stocks argued in Queensland Review that in addition to exposing and criticising official corruption in Queensland, The Cane Toad Times had a softer side, representing "the affable Queensland" in short stories such as "Bobby Skurm" by Denis Peel set in the late 1950s about the first kid to skateboard down Camp Hill, and "Denying the faith" by Errol O'Neill about an exchange between a State School kid and two Catholic boys, and Sean Mee's "Des ne refuse rien" about going to the dump. Stocks suggested these stories were indicative of a sort of "ghettoisation" of the counter-culture who developed their own cultural views about what was valuable in the Queensland experience.

In 1987 The Cane Toad Times found a hero in Tony Fitzgerald QC, who led the Fitzgerald Inquiry.

== Background of The Fitzgerald Inquiry ==
The Fitzgerald Inquiry, led by Tony Fitzgerald QC, commenced in May 1987 and ended in July 1989. The Inquiry examined the "Possible Illegal Activities and Associated Police Misconduct" in which Queensland police, including the Police Commissioner, were engaged in illegal gambling and receiving sexual services from brothels in the Fortitude Valley in Brisbane.

=== The Fitzgerald Collection – An Exhibition of artwork and memorabilia ===
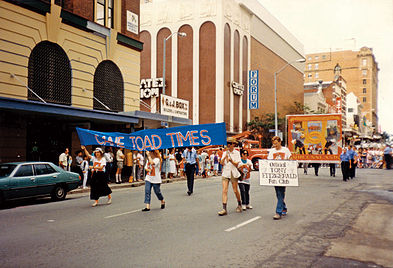
The Cane Toad Times editors and contributors participating in a May Day parade 1988. Photographer unknown, from the LHMU archives. From left Anne Jones, unknown, Michael Roper, Buffy Lavery and Robert Whyte

From 29 July 2009 – 9 August 2009 as part of the Griffith University – Tony Fitzgerald Lecture and Scholarship Program, "The Fitzgerald Collection" was exhibited at the Queensland College of Art (QCA) College Gallery, Tribune Street, South Bank, Brisbane, Queensland. The exhibition focussed on Mr Fitzgerald's personal collection of memorabilia and the influence that the Inquiry had upon Griffith University's staff and alumni. Exhibits relating to The Cane Toad Times included:

- Issues of The Cane Toad Times (collection of and comments by Professor Steve Stockwell )
- "Corruption" the Game (collection of ToadShow Pty Ltd, comments by Ms Anne Jones)
- Tony Fitzgerald Fan Club T-shirts (collection of ToadShow Pty Ltd, comments by Ms Anne Jones)

For the exhibition a giant working version of "Corruption" was displayed on the floor of the gallery. The display and pieces were designed by Professor Paul Cleveland, Director Queensland College of Art, and staff and students of QCA Liveworm studio.

The Corruption Board Game, ‘the game that gets you rotten’, appeared in The Cane Toad Times, Spring 1988, issue 11. In an interview with Zenovia Pappas conducted for "The Fitzgerald Collection" Anne Jones outlined the thinking behind the original design for The Corruption Board Game: "The idea came from one of the [Cane Toad Times] editors, Mark Bracken, who wanted to develop a board game that brought in all of the elements that were being investigated by the Fitzgerald Inquiry. so there was Vice, Crime, Gambling ... and Drugs. Although the Fitzgerald Inquiry really didn’t get into the whole drugs aspect of crime and corruption, which was a bit of a criticism at the time, the nature of the game had to have 4 main areas. So we brought drugs into ours. It brought in all the elements that were being talked about in the Fitzgerald Inquiry."

In the same interview The Cane Toad Times editor Anne Jones explained the history and impact of the Tony Fitzgerald Fan Club T-shirt: "It became obvious very quickly when the Fitzgerald Inquiry started that it was all gathering momentum, it was like a dam stemmed and Tony Fitzgerald obviously had a mind to get it all out in the open. And of course at The Cane Toad Times we immediately saw a marketing opportunity and we set up the Tony Fitzgerald Fan Club. And it wasn’t really a fan club, I have to say, it was just a t-shirt. The t-shirt had a drawing by one of The Courier Mail cartoonists Ricardo, that we got him to do. So we basically did up an artwork with Tony Fitzgerald holding a magnifying glass and the words, “Official Member Tony Fitzgerald Fan Club.” [...] Quentin Dempster who was the compere of the local 7:30 Report [...] was photographed in the newspaper wearing one. Wayne Goss, who would have been the leader of the opposition at the time, was photographed running, because he was a keen runner, wearing a Tony Fitzgerald Fan Club T-shirt."

== Contributors ==
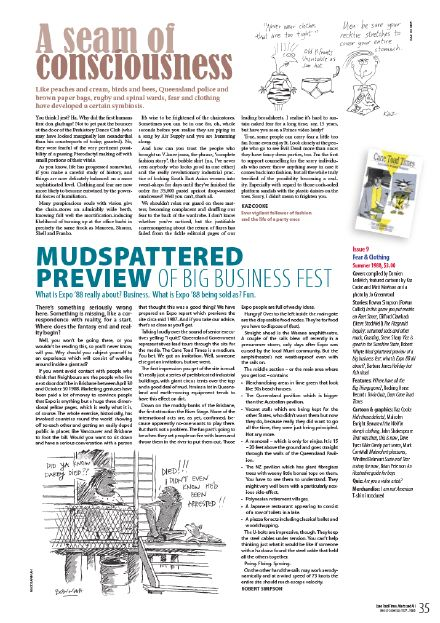
Page 35, featuring Kaz Cooke's Hermione the modern girl, The Cane Toad Times Warts and All Best of Collection 1977–1990

Geoffrey Adams, Bev Aisbett, Steve Aiken, Claire Allen, David Anthony, Peter Applegarth, Willy Bach, Sunil Badami, Max Bannah, David Barbagallo, Michael Barnett, Harry Brazier, Deb Beattie, Julia Bell, Winifred Belmont, James Bennett, Julie Bennett, Phil Berry, Tony Biggs, Jenni Bird, Peter Bisson, Roberta Blake, Danielle Bond, Mark Bracken, Harry Brazier, Brisbane Devotee, Barbara Brooks, Debbi Brown, Alan Burke, Rowan Callick, Gaynor Cardew, John Carey, Brian Cavanagh, Richard Chantrill, Gail Chillman, Clifford Clawback, Maria Cleary, Phillipa Cleary, Dale Cleashaw, Paul Cliff, Blair Coffey, Tony Collins, J Conlan, Gerry Connolly, Ian Cook, Kaz Cooke, Mark Cornwall, Bradley Cox, John Craig, Mark Creyton, Jayne Crook, Phil Cullen, Ian Cunningham, Alison Davis, Anna Maria Dell'Otto, Bing De Mucci, Rhana Devenport, Kath Duncan, Judy Dunn, Russell Edwards, Arnum Endean, Malcolm Enright, Ray Evans, Peter Fischmann, Donal Fitzpatrick, Valerie Foley, Jo Forsyth, Andrew Fraser, Martin Fripp, Michael Golledge, Sandra Golledge, Julie Goodall, Arthur Gorrie, Lance Grahame, Ian Gray, Peter Greenwood, Jo Greenwood, Nell Griffith, Andrew Griffith, Tim Gruchy, Nick Gruen, Richard Hagan, John Haigh, Philippa Hall, Helen Hambling, Steven Hamilton, Rell Hannah, Warren Hardy, Sally Hart, Jane Harty, Ronnie Hay, Neil Hayden, Connie Healy, Noela Hills, Ross Hinckley, Donald Holt, Judy Horacek, Nick Hughes, Louise Inglis, Glen Ingram, Lisa Jack, John Jiggens, Patrick Jewel, Anne Jones, Barbara Jones, Bill Jones, Randall Kamp, Chris Kelly, Fleur Kingham, Bill Kingswell, Anthony Kitchener, Shane Kneipp, Janice Knopke, Basil Krivoroutchko, Kus, Johnny La Rue, Russell Laedwig, Russell Lake, Lou Larder, John Lavery, Buffy Lavery, Nerissa Lea, Sean Leahy, Damien Ledwich, Gerard Lee, Jane Leonard, Glen Lewis, Naomi Lewis, Mark Lewis, Michael Long, Kandy-Mae Loughton, Ralf Loveday, Tim Low, Spina Macris, Anna Macrossin, Diedre Mahoney, Alex Manfrin, Flark March, Matthew Martin, Bill Mawson, Matt Mawson, Peter Mcallister, Jan McCallum, Gary McFeat, Sally McKenzie, Neil McKinnon, Ross McLeod, Sue McLeod, Andrew McMillan, Ian Mactinosh, Kevin Meade, Sean Mee, Seamus Mee, Lisa Meldrum, Peter Merrill, Ashleigh Merrit, Sasha Middleton, Angus Miller, John Mitchell, Beth Mohle, Jill Mohle, David Monaghan, Alison Muir, Craig Munro, Terry Murphy, Kevin Nemeth, Andy Nehl, Royce Nicholas, David Nichols, Sandra Nolan, Liam O'Dayell, Errol O'Neil, Beverley Parrish, Mirtek Pasciezny, Phyllis Patterson, Dan Pearce, Denis Peel, Sally Perfect, Gwyn Perkins, Brian Peterson, Kathleen Philips, Gary Phillips, Rose Pilbeam, Bob Piddington, Hans Post, Chris Prentice, Alex Prior, Rowan Pryor, David Pyle, Ken Queasey, Jean-Michel Raynaud, Milton Reach, Anthony Reilly, Albert Ricardo, Dave Richards, Caroline Risdale, Ian Roberts, Luke Roberts, David Robertson, Darryl Robson, Mark Ross, Lillian Rosser, Gabrielle Ryan, Leonard Ryzman, Peter Schofield, Paul Scott, Nik Scott, Jeremy Scriven, Will Self, John Shakespeare, Michael Sharkey, Steve Sharp, Justin Shaw, Shane Simpson, Damien Simpson, Anne Sinclair, Peter Skinner, Damien Smith, Lisa Smith, Greg Snook, John Stanwell, Herling Stayden, Ian Stevenson, Kate Stewart, Simon Stocks, Stephen Stockwell, Michael Southwell, Dr Strabismus, Howard Stringer, Will Stubbs, Harley Stumm, Rick Tanaka, Lenore Taylor, Stephen Taylor, Max Term, Robert Thompson, Bill Thorpe, Ted Trumpet, David Tyrer, Cecelia Van Heumen, Kevin Vellnagel, Warwick Vere, Cornelius Vleeskens, Natalia Von Helm, Alan Ward, Landon Watts, Michael Whelan, Robert Whyte, Liz Willis, Fiona Winning, Geoff Wood, Lindy Woodward, Julie Woodward, Robbie Wyatt, Chuck Zampieri

== Role in the history of Queensland ==
Raymond Evans in A History of Queensland places The Cane Toad Times in the broad context of Queensland radicalism, flying the 'freak flag' with radio station 4ZZZ and the Popular Theatre Troupe at a time when Brisbane boasted radical incidents of international significance, such as the first stirrings of second-wave feminist activism as early as 1965 and the first global punk anthem, I'm Stranded by The Saints in 1976.

As part of Politics & persuasion at slq a major historical exhibition running from November 2011 to March 2012 at the State Library of Queensland, the history of The Cane Toad Times and its role in the history of Queensland, Cane Toad Times: Poking fun in a police state, was mounted to showcase original issues of The Cane Toad Times publications as the centrepiece of an unfolding cultural history created by a collective of individuals who sought to expose a hidden Brisbane. The exhibition focussed on the writers, cartoonists and political activists who came together to produce The Cane Toad Times. The magazine, distributed nationally, dealt with popular culture issues including cane toads, Big Things, Bubbles Bathhouse and Queensland corruption. The exhibition drew on the collection of the State Library of Queensland and University of Queensland's Fryer Library's protest march posters, original copies of The Cane Toad Times, photographs, T-shirts and artwork by cartoonists including John Shakespeare, Matt Mawson, and Judy Dunn, in the Philip Bacon Gallery, level 4, State Library, Stanley Place, South Bank, Brisbane.

The exhibition documents the birth of The Cane Toad Times in 1977 when Premier of Queensland, Joh Bjelke-Petersen was a decade into his reign. During this period Joh Bjelke-Petersen's government had banned the soundtrack of the musical Hair, declared a state of emergency during the 1971 South Africa rugby union tour of Australia, banned other political demonstrations and arrested of hundreds of street-marching protestors. Joh Bjelke-Petersen believed he was chosen by God to lead Queensland, claiming his 15 years living alone in a converted cow-bail, clearing 40 hectares of brigalow a day, gave him a better education than an Oxford degree. His conservative approach found favour with the prejudice and backwoods suspicion of many Queenslanders, especially outside the towns, where a country vote could be worth up to five times as much as a vote in the city in an electoral mal-apportionment known in Queensland as the gerrymander. Political protests were crushed, cultural and music venues shut down, and young people, considered to be troublemakers, were harassed. Protesters were considered misfits and malcontents, typified by Joh as ‘friends of the dirt’, the ‘anti-nuclear lot’ and the ‘everything for the aborigines crowd’. By 1983, Joh's Nationals were ruling in their own right with the simple slogan "Joh. Queensland.".

The year of 1977 coincided with the onset of two crucial years of pitched battle on the campuses and streets of Brisbane. The battle was between Joh and his cohorts on one side — and on the other a rag-tag alliance of civil liberties lawyers, marxists, students, academics, unionists, musicians, actors and women. Joh presided over an apparently conservative establishment yet below the surface was a deeply corrupt police force in bed with politicians, prostitution racketeers, SP betting, drug laundering, illegal casinos and payoffs. Chris Masters, whose Four Corners exposé The Moonlight State would help bring down the corrupt regime, explained: "Hector Hapeta’s main brothel Top of the Valley commanded a useful corner position at a major Fortitude Valley junction. It seemed to me that in the tradition of giant pineapples and giant prawns you see at coastal tourist towns, a giant penis would have not been out of place. It would have been no less blatant."

In 1983, Anne Jones and Damien Ledwich took the long view with The Cane Toad Times — Joh Bjelke-Petersen couldn't last forever. Labor was back in power nationally and was supporting the Queensland political and cultural left with arts funding, notably funding the Popular Theatre Troupe, an agit-prop ensemble satirising Joh's banana republic in factories and shopping centres. Anne Jones and Damien Ledwich were both 4ZZZ and Semper Floreat alumni, equipped with radio and newspaper communication skills. The Cane Toad Times 1983–1990 was a mixture of hard-hitting journalism, rants, cartoon strips, parodies, lists, short stories, quizzes and bold graphic design. Among The Cane Toad Times editors, it was Damien Ledwich who was most insistent on the need to seize the mainstream publishing tools of mass production and wide circulation. He was not interested in one-off performance, or appealing to the arts ghetto.

The Cane Toad Times V.2's finest moment was probably Issue 4's detailed list of everything rotten in the state of Queensland. Compiled by Stephen Stockwell, this built on Kev Hooper's landmark revelations under parliamentary privilege. Phil Dickie’s subsequent newspaper reports in The Courier-Mail led to the broadcast on Four Corners of The Moonlight State. Having watched the Four Corners expose, acting Premier Bill Gunn ordered an inquiry the following day, 11 May 1987. The Fitzgerald Inquiry, led by Tony Fitzgerald QC, ran from May 1987 and ended in July 1989.

These were the halcyon days of The Cane Toad Times. On TV, there were nightly re-enactments of Fitzgerald Inquiry hearings. Still in government, but reeling in the polls, the Nationals in parliament rebelled and deposed Joh, choosing Mike Ahern instead. Joh asked the Governor of Queensland to sack all his ministers so he could continue to rule. The Governor declined. By 2 December 1989, it was all over – Wayne Goss and Labor swept to power. Former civil liberties lawyer and Labor Party State Secretary Peter Beattie was given the job of chairman of the parliamentary committee overseeing the Criminal Justice Commission, now the Crime and Misconduct Commission. Beattie went on to be Queensland Premier.

== See also ==
- Pig City (song)
- Brisbane punk rock
- Pig City music festival and symposium
- Street Arts Community Theatre Company
- Behind the Banana Curtain – (compilation music album)
- Cane toad
