= Street Arts =

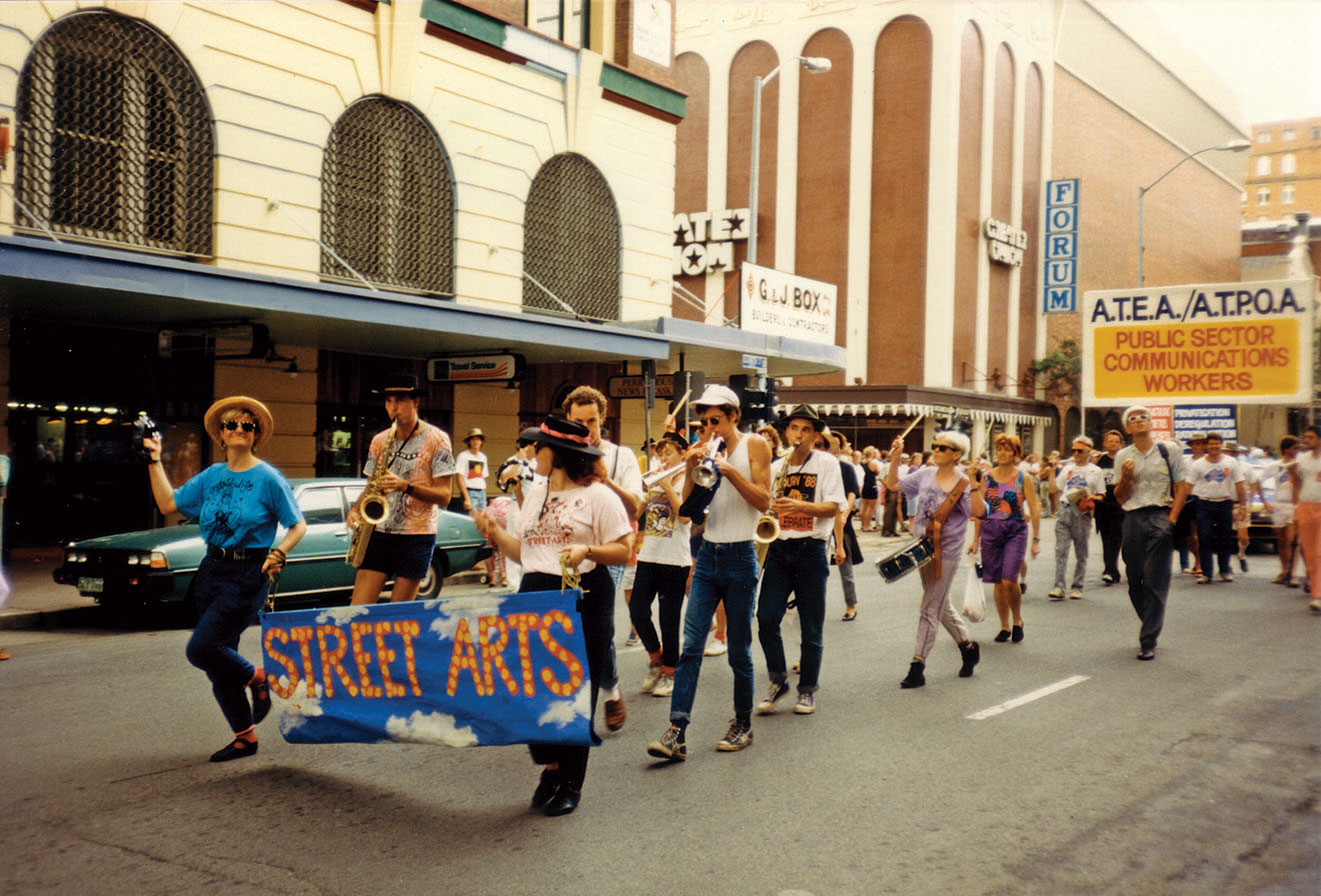
Street arts members participating in a May Day March 1988, photographer unknown, from the LHMU Queensland collection. From left Fiona Winning, Denis Peel playing saxophone, Katrina Devery, Derek Ives with cornet, Chris Sleight with saxophone, Meg Kanowski with drum, Pauline Peel, Gavan Fenelon, Alan (Fox) Rogers. The banner was painted by Mark Crocker.

Street Arts Community Theatre Company was a theatre company in Brisbane, Queensland, Australia. It was founded in October 1982 in West End, Brisbane, by Denis Peel, Pauline Peel, Steve Capelin and Andrea Lynch. Street Arts was preceded in Brisbane by the agitprop ensemble the Popular Theatre Troupe. While continuing in the Popular Theatre Troupe's tradition of satire and radical political commentary, the Street Arts approach was to create theatre and circus by enabling disadvantaged communities. This became the dominant community arts methodology in Queensland in the mid-1980s, attracting funding from Australian arts boards including the Community Arts Board and Performing Arts Board. In 1997 it changed its focus to interdisciplinary public art and renamed itself The Arterial Group Inc. Arterial produced a substantial number of projects with urban and regional Queensland communities from 1996 to 2004.

== Beginnings ==
In 1982, after returning to Brisbane, Steve Capelin and his partner Andrea Lynch formed Street Arts with Pauline and Denis Peel to give a focus to their community arts activities. Pauline and Denis Peel had been involved in community arts projects in Edinburgh public-housing areas, Scotland, in 1980. In the same year Steve Capelin was a member of WEST Community Theatre's clown troupe in Melbourne. All three had been teachers in the Queensland education system and were strongly influenced by Ian Reece's Children's Activity Group and the community arts director Neil Cameron.

In 1982 Street Arts successfully applied for funding from the Australia Council. They were known to outgoing Director Andrea Hull, who had admired the Peels' work in Scotland. The incoming director of the Community Arts Board was Jon Hawkes, one of the founding principals in Circus Oz. Hawkes was well disposed towards political theatre with a mix of circus and rock'n'roll.

Street Arts' first funded project was the 1983 Community Circus Festival in West End, featuring circus workshops at schools and in public halls. Key participants included clown Tony Hannan, writer-director-performer Meg Kanowski, musical director Peter Stewart and circus performer Derek Ives.

== Personnel and projects ==
The period 1982–1986 saw Street Arts involved in 28 projects including residencies, company shows, and large community events. Therese Collie, who had been part of the Popular Theatre Troupe joined as writer-director-performer. Later coordinators included Fiona Winning, Kara Miller and Cynthia Irvine. Kath Porrill, a former member of the Grin and Tonic Theatre Troupe as well as Popular Theatre Troupe, Gavan Fenelon of Order by Numbers, and Roger Rosser of the Popular Theatre Troupe were key players. The company often hired top billing guest artists.

Inala In Cabaret in 1983 involved several women who went on to form Icy Tea – a professional women's theatre company. In 1984 a large scale outdoor event Once upon Inala, written by Nick Hughes who had worked with the Popular Theatre Troupe was performed to a crowd of 1500 in Kev Hooper Park, with a cast of over 100, including large puppets and a live band.

In 1984 Street Arts was contracted by John Stanwell, Griffith University's Community Arts Officer for Brisbane-South and Logan City, to work on a large high school project The Logan City Story written by Pat Cranney, music by Danny Fine and directed by Richard Collins, staged in the centre court of Woodridge Plaza Shopping Centre. In the same year Street Arts conceived a touring show of Rites, Wrongs and Off-beat Thongs with writer Phil Sumner formerly of Melbourne's WEST Community Theatre.

In 1986, Street Arts most successful year, the company produced the Art in Working Life project Sweeping Statements and created an offshoot that became Rock'n'Roll Circus, the brainchild of circus performer Lachlan McDonald. A two-week season of rock'n'roll circus performances at the Rialto Theatre in West End was a success. The participants wanted to continue and formed Rock'n'Roll Circus in 1987.

== The Paint Factory years ==
In 1987 Street Arts moved to a disused warehouse known as the Paint Factory (Corner Donkin St & Montague Rd), a venue lacking kitchen, washing facilities or toilets, yet surviving as the base of the company for the next five years. During its period as a venue the Paint Factory hosted 11 Street Arts shows, eight Rock'n'Roll Circus shows and became something of a community arts centre. Porta-Loos were hired when required.

In 1988 Street Arts responded to the International exposition held at South Bank, Brisbane, Expo 88 by highlighting the plight of the homeless displaced by property development and rising rents in two shows, High Rent Low Life and Underwraps written by Kerry O'Rourke and directed by Meg Kanowski.

The late 1980s saw Street Arts working with local Murri people on Jalalu Jalu: Land, Law and Lies and Thru Murri Eyes. Follow ups to this direction were works in Logan City with Hugh Watson as writer, Sarah Moynihan as visual artist and Rebecca Lister as cultural liaison.

Much debate has been aired around the role of the funding bodies in shaping the direction of the later projects of Street Arts, especially the Australia Council's Performing Arts Board, which seemed at the time to be requiring high standards of traditional theatre as a prerequisite for funding. Whether or not this was truly the case, the feeling that it was influenced artistic decisions and to some extent took the wind out of Street Arts' sails. Quick Quick Slow known as the Dance Marathon project, based in Ipswich was a lackluster affair.

== The final years ==
In 1990 and 1991 Therese Collie's Out of the Blue, a project with women in prisons that toured successfully through the Queensland prison system. At the same time the difficulties of maintaining a large venue with very primitive facilities were proving insurpassable and Street Arts moved into a smaller office in Boundary Street, somewhat demoralised, wondering whether or not to fold.

The Joh Bjelke-Petersen era had come to an end after the Fitzgerald Inquiry of 1987 and 1988 found evidence of official corruption in the police force. Street Arts was without its obvious target, yet writer-director Therese Collie and others felt there much work to do with disadvantaged communities. This period featured Liveable Streets with writer Catherine Fargher, visual artist Kath Porrill and visual artist Pat Zuber.

The tenth anniversary of Street Arts was celebrated with The Next Stop West End Magical Mystery Bus Tour and the Street Arts Tenth Birthday Party at South's Leagues Club. A soul-searching analysis was undertaken by the new Street Arts team, occurring during a very quiet 1993, after which the company continued with modest success through the 1990s.

== See also ==
- Culture of Brisbane
- The Cane Toad Times
- Pig City music festival and symposium
