= Bush Blitz =

Australian Species discovery program

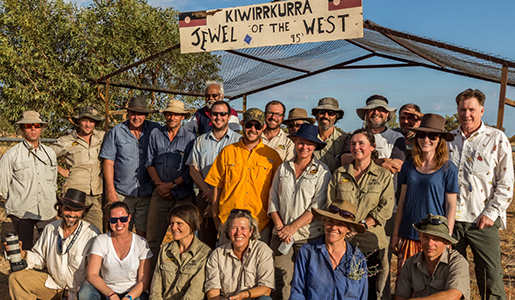
Bush Blitz team at Kiwirrkurra Indigenous Protected area in the Gibson Desert

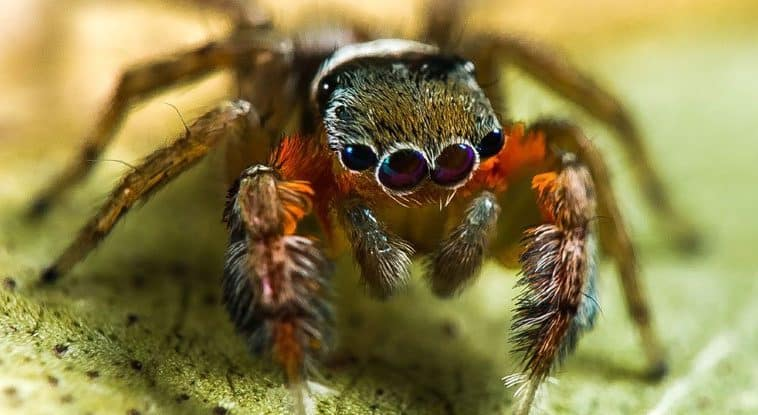
A new species of jumping spider discovered at the Quinkan Bush Blitz in 2017

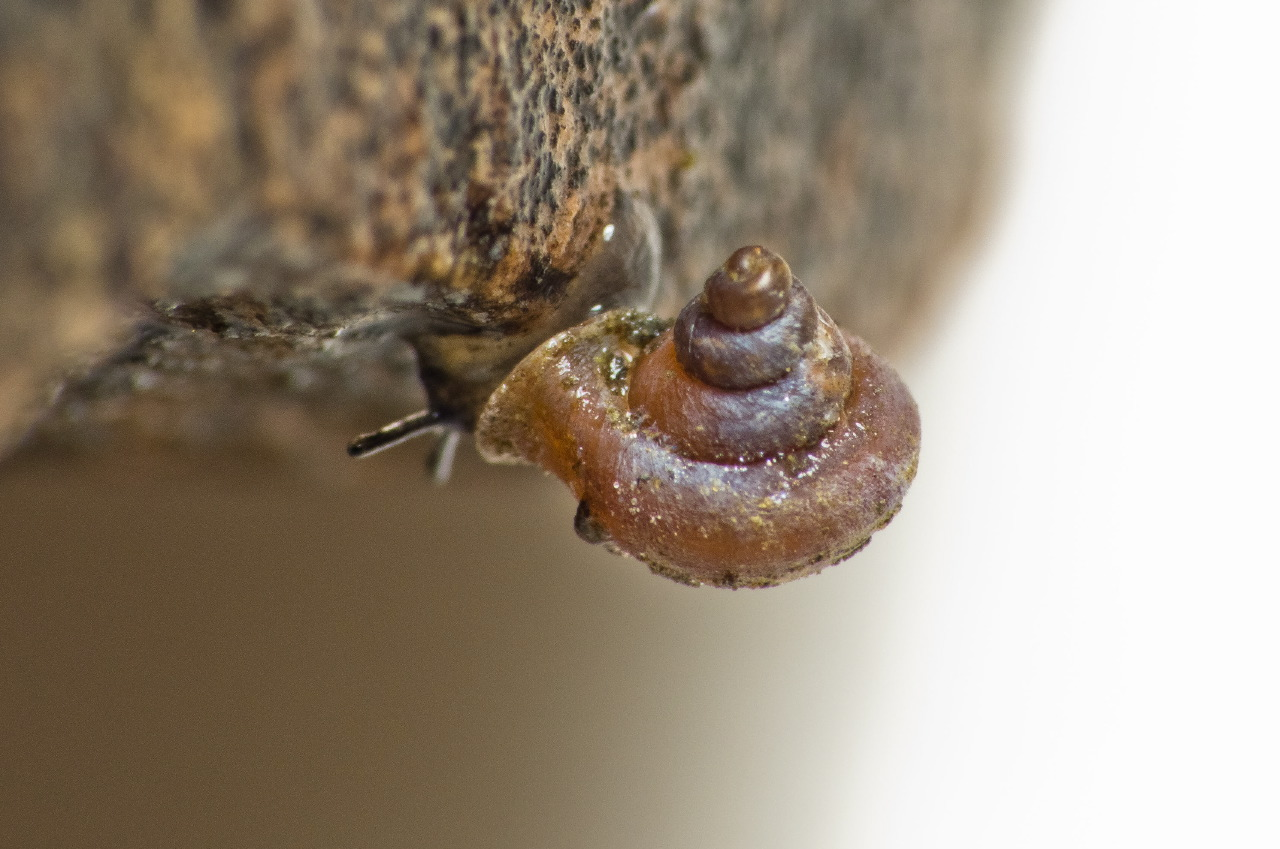
Gastropoda Gyliotrachela australis trumpet snail, Bush Blitz Fish River Station, Douglas Daly Research Farm, NT

Bush Blitz is a species discovery program conducting scientific surveys in Australian terrestrial and marine environments to document known and new fungi, plants and animals. The program is a partnership between the Australian Government, BHP Sustainable Communities and Earthwatch Australia. Bush Blitz is managed through Parks Australia and the Australian Biological Resources Study. The program began in 2010, the International Year of Biodiversity, involving specialist taxonomists, indigenous communities, rangers and landowners, teachers, students and BHP employees. Bush Blitz funds taxonomy and further research based on material collected during Bush Blitz surveys, specifically targeted to assist in the publication of new species and the resolution of problematic groups collected from surveys.

== Expeditions ==
Bush Blitz conducts surveys in Australia's National Reserve System, made up of more than 9,000 properties, national parks and reserves. Expeditions have included:

- Quinkan, Queensland, 2017
- Croajingolong National Park, Victoria, 2016
- Mallacoota, Victoria, 2016
- Lake Torrens, South Australia, 2016
- Kiwirrkurra IPA Western Australia, 2015
- Judbarra / Gregory National Park, NT, 2015
- Olkola Country, Queensland, 2015
- Carnarvon Station Reserve, Queensland, 2014
- Durack River and Karunjie Stations, Western Australia 2014
- Flinders Island, Tasmania, 2014
- Five Rivers Reserve and trawtha makuminya, Tasmania, 2014
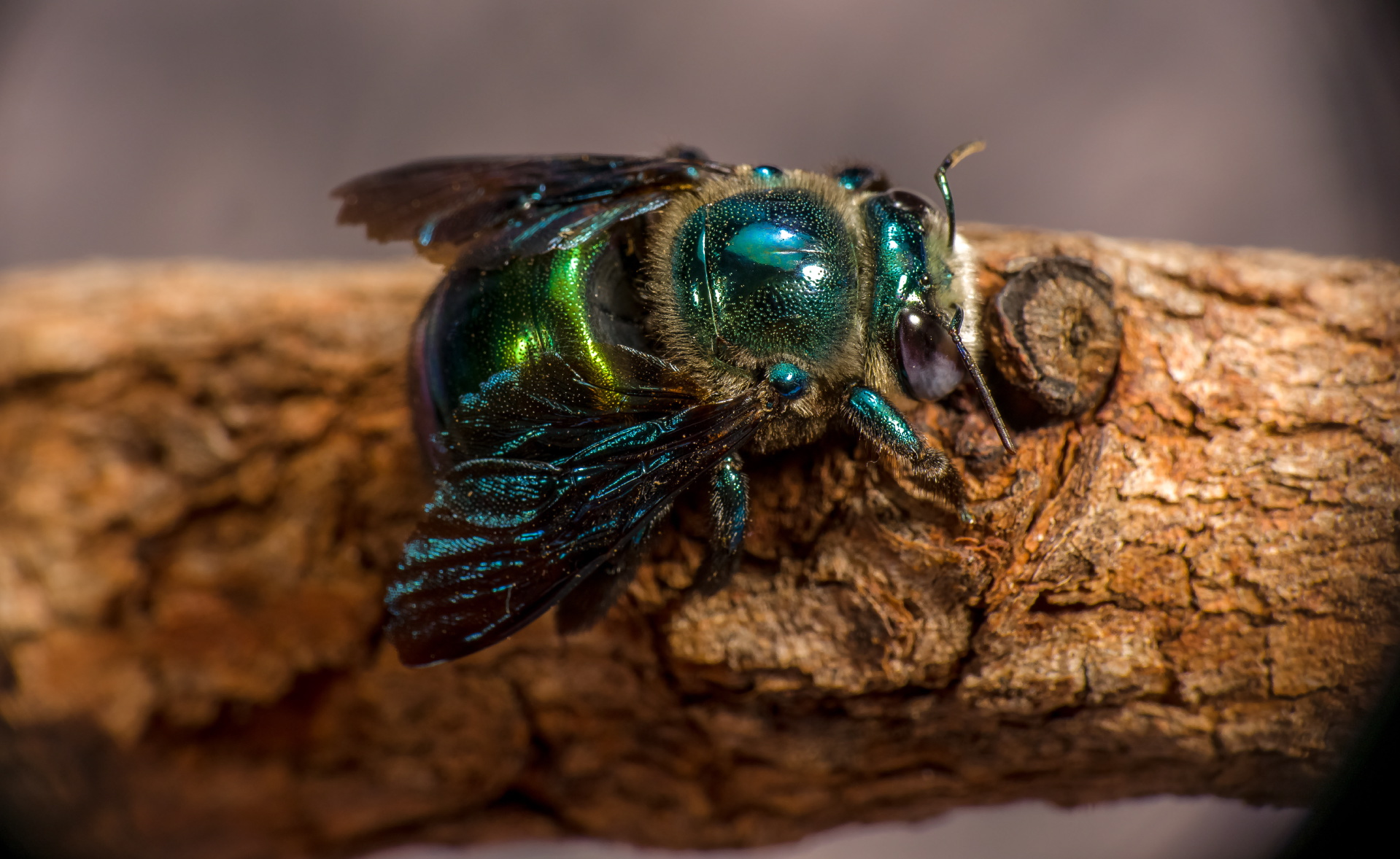
- Green carpenter bee in Quinkan Country, far north Queensland
  Namadgi National Park ACT and Kosciuszko National Park NSW, 2013
- Henbury Station, NT, 2013
- Hiltaba Nature Reserve and Gawler Ranges National Park, SA, 2012
- Wongalara Sanctuary, NT, 2012
- Fish River Station, NT, 2012
- Skullbone Plains, Tasmania, 2012
- Credo Station Reserve WA, 2011
- Cane River Conservation Park, Cane River region, WA, 2011
- Lake Condah (Kurtonitj, Lake Condah and Tyrendarra Indigenous Protected Areas Vic), 2011
- Neds Corner Station, Vic, 2010
- Central NSW (Dananbilla, Illunie and Koorawatha Nature Reserves NSW), 2010
- Bon Bon Station Reserve SA, 2010
- Witchelina Nature Reserve, SA, 2010
- Wet Tropics (Brooklyn, Cloudland and Melsonby (Gaarraay) Nature Refuges, Eubenngee Swamp, Hann Tableland and Melsonby (Gaarraay) National Parks, and Upper Bridge Creek Qld), 2010
- Tasmania (Egg Islands, Flat Rock, Lower Porter Hill and Porter Hill, Murphys Flat, Seventeen Mile Plain and Vale of Belvoir Reserves) Tas, 2010
- Darkwood Reserve, NSW, 2010
- North-western NSW and Southern Qld, 2009–10
- Charles Darwin, Kadji Kadji, Karara and Lochada Reserves, WA, 2009

== New species ==
In 2017 Bush Blitz announced it had discovered 1196 new Australian species including 1139 new animals (including a fish, 17 slugs and snails, three scorpions and 92 bees) 27 new plants, 26 new lichens and 4 new fungi species. After the March 2017 Bush Blitz to Quinkan Country in Queensland's Cape York Peninsula the number of new species was put at 1200 after a fruitful expedition "likely to yield the greatest number of new species discoveries" of the 34 expeditions conducted to that time. The new discoveries included more than 50 new species of spiders in Quinkan Country west of Cooktown in northern Queensland, suggesting Cape York Peninsula could be a hotspot for spider diversity in Australia.

A peacock spider discovered at Carnarvon Station in western Queensland, in 2014, one of six new species of peacock spider described in 2016 by Barbara Baehr and Robert Whyte of Queensland Museum, was named Maratus lincunxini in honour of Queensland Ballet artistic director Li Cunxin, known for his book Mao's Last Dancer.

== TeachLive ==
Primary and secondary teachers from across Australia join Bush Blitz scientists in the field in BushBlitz TeachLive. Earthwatch Australia developed the educational program TeachLive in 2003. The Bush Blitz TeachLive Project involves the Australian Science Teachers Association. Participants teach 'live' back to their students via the dedicated Bush Blitz TeachLive website. Teachers interact with students via live web forums. They post daily highlights and photos, communicating via Skype and other online tools. Teaching resources as educational units for primary and secondary schools are provided.

== See also ==
- BioBlitz
