= Terry O'Gorman =

Australian lawyer and civil libertarian

Terry O'Gorman is a lawyer in Queensland, Australia and leading civil libertarian. In 1979, O'Gorman was elected President of the Queensland Council for Civil Liberties ('QCCL') and served as president until 1985. He again held presidency from 1990 to 1994. He is currently the Vice President of the QCCL.

O'Gorman specialises in criminal law, yet it was the area of Aboriginal Aid in which he first commenced his legal career. An influential member of the QCCL, "it was during the days as a university student and under the rule of Joh Bjelke-Petersen that he first became aware of the need to protect civil rights." In 2008 O'Gorman commented that "civil liberties on the streets have improved, but the battle has moved to a 'law and order auction' being played out in the media, which used to be centred around the political cycle but now appears to be a permanent fixture."

== Early years ==
Raised in Brisbane, he was one of 15 children raised in a Catholic family which included two police officers, another lawyer, and three nuns. As a university student during the Bjelke-Petersen years, O'Gorman became aware of the need to fight for human rights. His early working years were spent with Aboriginal Legal Aid. It was there that he noticed the brutal treatment of indigenous Australians at the hands of the police. Taking matters into their own hands, O'Gorman and colleagues began secretly taping the police. This resulted in a number of miscarriage of justice cases being proved.

By cross-examining Joh Bjelke-Petersen during the Fitzgerald Inquiry, he was instrumental in changing the thinking and mindset of judges and politicians who refused to believe that the police were abusing their positions of power.

== Later years ==
In later years O'Gorman became involved in the Australian Council of Civil Liberties. He has also been involved in a number of issues involving racism, treatment of asylum-seekers, the introduction of the Smart Card and the Go card. He has also been critical of the way that Australia's police have dealt with indigenous Australians, and the resulting Deaths in custody.

In July 2010 it was reported in major newspapers around Australia that people have had their movements tracked by using the Go Card. It had turned out that Australian police had been accessing the Go Card records to find out about the movements of certain people. O'Gorman had commented that he wasn't surprised that the police were accessing Go Card records, stating that previous concerns asserting that Go Cards would be used for surveillance had been justified. O'Gorman also stated that he was unsure if his Go Card was registered, as his wife had obtained it for him, but added that he would be de-registering it. As of August 2010, Queensland Police were set to appeal to the state’s privacy commissioner not to cut their access to the movements of Brisbane's commuters that were recorded on the Go Cards.

== Current ==
At present he is a lawyer with Robertson O'Gorman Solicitors. He is also the Vice President of the Queensland Council for Civil Liberties.
