= Pig City (song) =

Pig City is an independently released song recorded in late 1983 by the Brisbane band The Parameters. The song critiques the corrupt and authoritative aspects within Joh Bjelke-Petersen's Queensland State coalition government and Queensland police force during the early 1980s. Issues raised within the song included banning of street marches, persecution of Aboriginal Australians, ministerial and government corruption, SP bookmaking, police harassment and Special Branch surveillance.

The song later lent its name to the 2004 book "Pig City - from the Saints to Savage Garden" written by Andrew Stafford. Stafford's book explores the political climate and music scene in Brisbane between 1971 and 2000.

In 2007, the song's title has also referenced within the name of the Queensland Music Festival, Pig City: Brisbane's Historical Soundtrack. This day-long festival featured music originating from Brisbane over the past 30 years. The festival included the first reformation in 30 years of The Saints and also performance by The Apartments, The Riptides, Ups and Downs, The Pineapples From The Dawn Of Time, Regurgitator, Screamfeeder, Kev Carmody and Kate Miller-Heidke performing songs by The Go-Betweens. The festival also included a reformation of members of The Parameters performing Pig City.

In "Pig City": An Interview with Andrew Stafford", Andrew Stafford stated that "the reason I chose that song for the title was that it was really a rallying call, and a signature song for Brisbane at that time. Certainly if you listened to ZZZ in that period, the song was inescapable and it was so symbolic of living in Brisbane at that time, it described so vividly what it was like to live here."

The song was written by Tony Kneipp and recorded over two-week period at 4ZZZ's studios at the University of Queensland. Each track on the song was recorded and overdubbed separately.

The Parameters members included Tony Kneipp on vocals, rhythm and slide guitars and saxophone, Ian Graham on lead guitar and bass and Steven Pritchard on drums.

Pig City received a large amount of airplay on the independent radio station 4ZZZ and regularly featured within the station's annual Hot 100. A single was released in 1984, which included "Material Possession" on the b-side.

In 2023, Brisbane band Sacred Hearts covered the song as a part of the 4000 Records "House Keys 2" compilation. The compilation consisted of Brisbane artist's covering Brisbane artist's, with proceeds of physical CD's going to 4ZZZ.

== See also ==
- Brisbane punk rock
- The Cane Toad Times
- Behind the Banana Curtain - (compilation music album)
- Queensland street marches
