= Pig City (music festival) =

One-day music festival in Queensland, Australia

Pig City: Brisbane's Historical Soundtrack was a one-day music festival held as part of the Queensland Music Festival in 2007. The idea for the concert came from Queensland Music Festival Artistic Director for 2007 Paul Grabowsky, who was inspired after reading Andrew Stafford's book Pig City: From The Saints To Savage Garden. The festival was held on 14 July at The University of Queensland. It ran from midday to 10 pm.

The Pig City concert is regarded as one of the biggest concerts staged in the premises of the University of Queensland in recent years since O Week (Orientation Week) concerts, namely the first Livid Festival in 1989.

The line-up for the festival included: The Saints, Regurgitator, The Riptides, Kev Carmody, Screamfeeder, David McCormack, Ups & Downs, The Apartments, The Pineapples from the Dawn of Time, Kate Miller-Heidke, and The Brisbane Excelsior Band. The Saints were the main headliner for the festival, their appearance marking a reunion of the founding members of the band after a 28-year separation.

== Pig City (symposium) ==
A symposium – Pig City: Then & Now, A Symposium on the Past, Present & Future of the Rock Music Industry in Brisbane – was held at The University of Queensland on 13 July 2007, the day before Pig City: Brisbane's Historical Soundtrack. It was organised by The University of Queensland's Centre of Critical and Cultural Studies and featured Andrew Stafford, who gave a keynote speech. He took the opportunity to address criticisms that suggested the book was written by an individual who was not present during the tumultuous period of Bjelke-Petersen's tyrannical reign, but wished he was. He explained he had no intentions to "romanticise the era", rather he wanted to pay tribute to Brisbane's bands of that period who were not given due recognition in Australia's music industry.

Stafford also explained that major cultural movements were the result of a convergence of local, national, and international factors. He gave the example of the music scene in the 1970s as drawing both positive and negative energy alike from the local enthusiasm for the right to march movement, the national reaction to the dismissal of the Whitlam government, and the international anarchy inspired by the Sex Pistols in the UK.

== Pig City (song) ==
The title Pig City originated from the song Pig City recorded by Brisbane band The Parameters in late 1983. The song was written by Tony Kneipp, lead singer of the band. It critiques the political environment of Queensland's State coalition government in the 1980s, referencing persecution of Aboriginal people, corruption within the government and police force, and banning of street marches.

== Pig City (book) ==
Pig City: From The Saints To Savage Garden was written by Andrew Stafford over a period of three years, and published in 2004 by The University of Queensland Press. It is the first published book for Stafford. He was born in Melbourne in 1971, before moving to Brisbane in 1987 at the age of 15. Growing up in Brisbane in the late 1980s and early 1990s played a vital role in sparking Stafford's interest in Brisbane's politics and music scene.

Stafford borrowed the title for his book from the song Pig City by The Parameters. In a media release from The University of Queensland Press, Stafford is quoted as saying "although this song was barely heard outside of Brisbane, it became something of a rallying cry for those who stayed behind to fight the good fight at a time when everyone else was bailing out of the city. I decided to name the book after that song".

Pig City offers readers an insight into the development of the Brisbane music scene from the 1970s to 2000. The scope of Pig City not only documents those Brisbane bands that have gained worldwide recognition, such as The Saints, The Go-Betweens, and Savage Garden, but also explores the journey of lesser-known local Brisbane bands like Razar and The Parameters. Brisbane's political climate through this time is tightly interwoven with the development of the music scene. However, Stafford stresses the importance of recognising that "bad politics does not, in and of itself, result in a great and glorious music scene".

Pig City bases its informative historical perspective on nearly 100 interviews with musicians, journalists and authors. It is a valuable history, which captures the development of not just Brisbane's music scene, but also its political and cultural development. For Stafford "Pig City is the story of how Brisbane grew up". This is a story largely neglected by other Australian music literature. "Firstly, as a music fan, I wanted to pay tribute to Brisbane’s bands, most of whom I felt had received short shrift in the still-slim literature on Australian music, in which Brisbane’s contribution was treated as a footnote".

While Pig City is currently Stafford's only published book, he has also worked as a freelance writer. He has been published in various print media in Australia, including The Age, The Australian, Sydney Morning Herald, Australian Geographic and Rolling Stone Australia. Stafford has also been employed as a university tutor, occasional environmental consultant, and a taxi driver.

== Brisbane Politics from the late 1960s to 1980s ==
Brisbane in the 1970s and 1980s was often viewed as a cultural backwater, referred to by many journalists as the Deep North. It was seen as lacking "bookshops, political pubs, radio and television network headquarters where Australian intellectuals could be seen and heard". The history of Queensland politics of this time also shows a long association between the police, the government, and corruption. Much critique of Queensland politics of the 1970s and 1980s focuses on the premiership of Sir Joh Bjelke-Petersen. Bjelke-Petersen held the political office of Premier of Queensland from 1968 to 1987. He was a conservative politician, a devout Lutheran fundamentalist, and deeply involved in the corrupt government. Culturally, the Brisbane music scene of the same time is viewed as one of its best.

In the late 1960s, the New Left movement began in Queensland, activated largely in response to issues arising from the Vietnam War, civil liberties, and conscription. Before the late 1960s, public demonstrations had rarely been used as tools of political action. However, after 1965, they became "a regular feature of Queensland life". This was despite the fact that under Queensland's Traffic Act, demonstrators were required to obtain police permits for street marches to be considered legal. Police were able to refuse these permits at any time and without giving any reason.

The demonstrations in 1971 in Brisbane against the Springbok tour, and the aftermath, illustrate the conservative regulation of Queensland under the Bjelke-Petersen premiership. From state to state, the Springbok team were faced with demonstrations in condemnation of South Africa's apartheid laws. In Brisbane, Bjelke-Petersen "proclaimed a month-long state of emergency…on the pretext of protecting a visiting football team from political dissenters". The state of emergency saw the suspension of civil liberties and led to police being granted with "extraordinary (and unspecified)" powers.

Demonstrators greeted the Springboks when they arrived in Brisbane on 22 July 1971. Approximately 300 demonstrators were present, and the same number of police. While police assaulted some demonstrators during this first demonstration, it was the demonstration on 24 July that was the most volatile. The number of police had increased to around 500, with country police brought in to add to the numbers. When police commissioner Ray Whitrod gave the order for the police to move forward, intending to move demonstrators from the road, police charged. Demonstrators were forced to move by police who tackled and hit them with batons. Mass arrests of demonstrators also resulted from these demonstrations.

These mass arrests were one of the major catalysts that encouraged University of Queensland students, as well as left unionists, to explore better ways to communicate with the Brisbane public. In 1975, the 4ZZZ FM radio station was founded at The University of Queensland's St Lucia campus. It was a response to Queensland's "political and cultural conservatism". 4ZZZ FM aimed to "offer local perspectives which it believes were ignored by the mainstream stations" through its news and current affairs programming. The station also adopted rock music as the main feature of its musical programming, in a move to attract Brisbane's alternative youth market. It is considered a major part of the development of Brisbane's music scene at the time, giving airtime to local bands such as The Saints, The Go-Betweens, and The Parameters.

From the mid-1970s to the late 1980s, the premiership of Bjelke-Petersen remained largely unchanged. The premier was generally untouched politically by allegations of corruption against him and the Queensland government. Brisbane's music scene is viewed as having been affected both positively and negatively by the political environment. However, it cannot be suggested that a conservative political environment by itself produces a great music scene. Another important influence of Brisbane's music scene in the 1970s and 1980s was the music coming out of Britain and America at that time, particularly bands such as the Sex Pistols and The Stooges.

== Sources ==
- Papers of Andrew Stafford, UQFL440, Box 1, Fryer Library, University of Queensland Library.
- 'Commemorative booklet for the Pig City concert', Papers of Andrew Stafford, UQFL440, Box 1, Fryer Library, University of Queensland Library.
- 'Copy of UQNews, August 2007, with cover article on the Pig City concert', Papers of Andrew Stafford, UQFL440, Box 1, Fryer Library, University of Queensland Library.
- 'Typed speech: Andrew Stafford, "Keynote Speech to Pig City Symposium", delivered at the University of Queensland, 13 Jul 2007', Papers of Andrew Stafford, UQFL440, Box 1, Fryer Library, University of Queensland Library.
- Coaldrake, P. & Wanna, J. (1988). 'Not like the Good Old Days': The political impact of the Fitzgerald Inquiry into police corruption in Queensland. The Australian Quarterly, 60(4), 404–414.
- Crawford, R. (2007). Pig City: From the Saints to Savage Garden by Andrew Stafford. Reviews in Australian Studies, 2(7), 1–2.
- Fitzgerald, R. (1984). Censorship in Queensland 1954–83. Australian Journal of Politics & History, 30(3), 348–362.
- Knight, A. (2001). Won't get fooled again: Radio journalism and the birth of community radio. Australian Community Broadcasting Series, 1(6), 1–14.
- Knight, A. (2007). Radical media in the Deep North: The origins of 4ZZZ-FM. Queensland Review, 14(1), 95–105.
- Stafford, A. (2004). Pig City: From the Saints to Savage Garden. Brisbane: The University of Queensland Press.
