= 2008 Australia Day Honours =

The 2008 Australia Day Honours are appointments to various orders and honours to recognise and reward good works by Australian citizens. The list was announced on 26 January 2008 by the Governor General of Australia, Michael Jeffrey

The Australia Day Honours are the first of the two major annual honours lists, the first announced to coincide with Australia Day (26 January), with the other being the Queen's Birthday Honours, which are announced on the second Monday in June.

== Order of Australia ==
=== Companion (AC) ===
==== General Division ====
Recipient	Citation	Notes
Emeritus Professor Denise Irene Bradley AO	For service to higher education through leadership and sector-wide governance, to the promotion of information-based distance learning, and to the advancement of Australian educational facilities internationally.	
The Honourable Sir John Leslie Carrick KCMG	For distinguished service in the area of educational reform in Australia, particularly through the advancement of early childhood education and to the development and support of new initiatives in the tertiary sector, and to the broader community.	
The Honourable Justice Susan Maree Crennan	For outstanding service to the law and the judiciary, particularly through leadership and mentoring roles with legal and professional associations, as a contributor to reform, and to the community.	
William Duncan "Bill" Ferris AO	For service to the community through a range of philanthropic endeavours, as a leader in support of medical research, and to business and commerce through ongoing roles supporting Australian exports, venture capital and private equity.	
Lindsay Edward Fox AO	For continued service to the transport and logistics industries, to business through the development and promotion of youth traineeships, and to the community through a range of philanthropic endeavours.	
His Excellency Rear Admiral Kevin John Scarce AO, CSC, RANR	For distinguished contributions to Australia's defence industry through the provision of leadership and strategic advice on the development of naval capabilities, to maritime transport management, and to the people of South Australia.	

==== Military Division ====
Branch	Recipient	Citation	Notes
Air Force	Air Chief Marshal Angus Houston AO, AFC	For eminent service to the Australian Defence Force as Chief of the Defence Force.	

=== Officer (AO) ===
==== General Division ====
Recipient	Citation	Notes
The Honourable John "Neil" Andrew	For service to the Parliament of Australia through the advancement of parliamentary administration and reform, and to the community in the areas of agricultural research, development and education.	
Sir Arthur Brabham OBE	For service to motor sport as an ambassador, mentor and promoter of safety, and to the community through support of charitable organisations.	
The Honourable Dean Craig Brown	For service to the Parliament of South Australia, to the promotion of economic development and reform, and through enhancing business and investment opportunities.	
Richard "Leigh" Clifford	For service to business through executive roles in the mining industry, to the promotion of international trade and the development of export markets, and to the arts.	
Sir James Winter Cruthers	For service to the community of Western Australia through support and involvement with a wide range of community and charitable organisations, particularly in the fields of health and medical research, to the media, and the arts.	
Lisa Gay Curry-Kenny MBE, OAM	For service to the community through encouraging national pride and identity, particularly through leadership of the National Australia Day Council.	
Joseph Benjamin Elu	For service to the Indigenous community through contribution in the field of economic development, the promotion of financial independence and facilitating community partnerships with skilled volunteers.	
Lady Nancy Fairfax OBE	For service to the community, particularly through philanthropic support of a range of organisations in the ethics, health, aged care, volunteering, church and arts sectors.	
Professor John Kerr "Jock" Findlay AM	For service to medicine in the field of reproductive endocrinology as a researcher through contributions to the regulation and promotion of assisted reproductive technology and treatment, and to the development of national and international health programs.	
Professor Alan David Gilbert	For service to tertiary education, particularly in the area of administrative and funding reform at Melbourne University, to the promotion of electronic learning in developing countries, and to Australia's contribution to global developments in higher education and research.	
Dr William John Glasson	For service to medicine through contributions to people in rural and remote areas, to the eye health of Indigenous people, and to professional medical organisations.	
Major General Stephen Newman Gower AO (Retired)	For service to the museum sector, particularly through innovative leadership and management strategies as Director of the Australian War Memorial, and to tourism through involvement with and support for regional industry organisations.	
Peter Bruce Harmsworth	For service to public administration through leadership of a range of policy areas, in advancing the study and practice of public administration and as a champion of continuous improvement strategies.	
Professor Ross James Homel	For service to education, particularly in the field of criminology, through research into the causes of crime, early intervention and prevention methods.	
Reverend the Honourable Professor Brian Leslie Howe AM	For service to education and the community as an academic, an advocate for social sustainability and a facilitator of debate about public policy, particularly in the housing, employment and welfare sectors, to the development of public administration, to theology, and to the arts.	
Dr Leo Keliher	For service to public administration in Queensland and New South Wales, particularly as a leader in the implementation of public sector reform initiatives.	
Dr John Francis Laker	For service to the regulation of the Australian financial system and to the development and implementation of economic policies nationally and internationally	
Adjunct Professor Michael Lawrence-Brown	For service to medicine, particularly in the field of endovascular surgery, as a clinician, researcher and teacher, and through contributions to professional organisations.	
Dr Rex John Lipman AM, ED	For service to the tourism and hospitality industry, particularly as a founder of the International College of Hotel Management, and to education through support of learning opportunities for young people.	
Catherine Brighid Livingstone	For service to the development of Australian science, technology and innovation policies, to the business sector through leadership and management roles and as a contributor to professional organisations.	
Professor Michael Joseph Miller	For service to science, particularly through leadership roles in the innovation and development of future generation telecommunications technology.	
Susan Kathleen "Sue" Milliken	For service to the film and television industry through a range of organisations, as an advocate for the development of the industry, for support and encouragement of Indigenous film makers, and as a producer.	
Dr Spiro Moraitis CBE	For service to the Greek community through a range of executive roles with migrant assistance and aged welfare organisations, and to medicine as a general practitioner.	
Dr James Gardner Murray PSM	For service to the development and implementation of policies related to animal and plant health, pest and disease control, quarantine, food safety, agricultural trade and emergency management, and to veterinary science.	
Sister Patricia Mary Rhatigan	For service to rural and remote education, particularly through activities supporting Indigenous development and learning in the Kimberley region of Western Australia, and through Catholic, governmental, educational and representational roles at state and national levels.	
Ross Kenneth Rolfe	For service to the community through the development and implementation of major infrastructure policies and in the coordination of whole-of-government program initiatives in Queensland.	
Brigadier William Douglas Rolfe (Retired)	For service to veterans, particularly through leadership roles with the Veterans' Review Board, to the development and implementation of program initiatives, and to professional education.	
Joseph Alexander Skrzynski AM	For service to the cultural environment, particularly through visionary leadership and management strategies as Chairman of the Sydney Opera House Trust, through mentoring Australian film makers, to business through the venture capital and private equity industry, and to support for Indigenous scholarships.	
Mark Anthony Sullivan	For service to the community, particularly Australia's veterans, through contributions to new governance arrangements, and to major public policy developments in the areas of family support, multicultural affairs and Indigenous service delivery.	
Professor Gerard Roger Sutton	For service to tertiary education through administrative and representational roles, particularly as a leader in the growth and development of the University of Wollongong, through the promotion of international engagement in Australian higher education, and to the community of the Illawarra.	

==== Military Division ====
Branch	Recipient	Citation	Notes
Navy	Rear Admiral Rowan Carlisle Moffitt AM, RAN	For distinguished service as Maritime Commander Australia and Deputy Chief of Joint Operations.	
Army	Major General Michael Simon Hindmarsh AM, CSC	For distinguished service to the Australian Defence Force in senior command and staff appointments.	
Army	Major General Mark Andrew Kelly AM	For distinguished service to the Australian Army in the fields of training, personnel and operations, in particular as the Commander of the 1st Division and as the Land Commander Australia.	

=== Member (AM) ===
==== General Division ====
Recipient	Citation	Notes
Louise Adler	For service to literature as a publisher, through support for and the promotion of emerging authors, to tertiary education, and to the community.	
Thomas James Alford ED	For service to horticulture, particularly native plant conservation, and through support for Kings Park Botanic Garden, and to the community.	
Professor Michael Archer	For service to science as a palaeontologist, to the promotion of sustainable management of wildlife, to scientific education and research, and through mentoring and administrative roles.	
Dr Dominic Anthony Barbaro	For service to medicine as a general practitioner, through professional roles with a range of health and aged care organisations, and to the Italian community.	
The Honourable Barry Watson Beach	For service to the judiciary and to the law, particularly in the areas of compulsory mediation in case management, to the development and improvement of legal practice in Victoria, and through professional organisations.	
John Bennison OBE	For service to business, particularly in the primary industry sector through the promotion and development of commercial opportunities for farmers, and to the arts.	
Richard David Bett	For service to the arts as a promoter, supporter and mentor of visual contemporary artists, and to public arts administration and commercial practice in the gallery sector.	
Rosalyn Janice Bird	For service to education, particularly for young women, and through support for professional organisations, and as a contributor to the independent schools' sector.	
Professor Laurence Josesph Boulle	For service to the law, particularly in the fields of mediation, alternative dispute resolution and education, and as a contributor to legal publications.	
Associate Professor Frances Mary Boyle	For service to oncology as a researcher and clinician, particularly in the treatment of breast and brain cancers, to medical education, and as a contributor to professional organisations.	
Roslynne Vivienne Bracher	For service to the community through support for arts, research, health and social welfare organisations, to the promotion of cultural relations with Japan, and to business.	
Brother Barry James Buckley	For service to education through leadership and development roles in Catholic schools, and to religious life through the Congregation of Christian Brothers.	
Professor Lesley Veronica Campbell	For service to medicine as a clinician, academic and researcher in the field of endocrinology, to the development of the Diabetes Centre at St Vincent's Hospital, Sydney, and through professional organisations.	
Margaret Ruth Carnegie-Smith (née Eldridge)	For service to nursing, particularly through the delivery of health care services in rural and remote areas of the Northern Territory, and to the training and support of Indigenous health workers.	
Trevor Charles Christian	For service to the Indigenous community, particularly through the Sydney Regional Aboriginal Corporation for Legal Services, to the promotion of social justice, and to the sport of boxing.	
Adjunct Associate Professor Alexander Eric Churches	For service to engineering, particularly the promotion and development of mechanical design, to education, and through professional organisations.	
Colin Joseph Clapper	For service to the sport of squash, particularly to the administration, development and promotion of the game, through a range of executive roles, and to the establishment of the Oceania Squash Federation.	
Adrian Gratiaen Collette	For service to the performing arts, particularly through executive roles with Opera Australia, as a mentor to young artists, to publishing, and to the community.	
Victor Gerald Collins	For service to the tourism industry in Far North Queensland through the development and promotion of ecotourism projects, to the cattle industry, and to local government, sporting and youth organisations.	
Reverend the Honourable Patrick Comben	For service to the Parliament of Queensland, to the Anglican Church of Australia, and to the community through a range of environmental, heritage and social welfare organisations.	
James Wilson Cooper	For service to the transport industry, particularly through the development of specialist transportation systems for mining and livestock.	
Kenneth Walter Court	For service to business and commerce, particularly the development and promotion of international trade relations, to the manufacturing sector, and through executive roles with industry organisations.	
Levinia Crooks	For service to community health through contributions to HIV/AIDS policies and education, to support for people living with the condition, and to the promotion of improved health care delivery.	
Emeritus Professor Jeremy Guy Davis	For service to tertiary education, particularly as an educator in the discipline of strategic management, through a range of academic administrative roles, and to business and commerce.	
Arthur Owen Dixon	For service to international trade through leadership roles in the energy sector, particularly in the development of a bilateral agreement with China for the supply of liquified natural gas.	
Jon Thomas Donohoe	For service to sport through a range of professional organisations, particularly Surf Life Saving Australia, and to tourism.	
Alphonsus "Alf" D'Souza	For service to international trade through the energy sector as a contributor to the development of a bilateral agreement with China for the supply of liquefied natural gas.	
Dr Dan Maxwell Etherington	For service to international trade, particularly the design, manufacture and distribution of coconut oil extraction technology, and through contributions to sustainable agricultural and economic development in the South Pacific region.	
Dr Jeffory Graham "Jeff" Fairbrother	For service to the poultry industry through research and advisory roles, and the development of regulatory policies on animal health and welfare and food safety standards.	
Associate Professor Michael Robert Fearnside	For service to medicine, particularly neurosurgery, as a clinician, researcher and educator, to medical administration and the development of professional standards, and to the medico-legal sector.	
Denis John Feeney	For service to human resource management in the tertiary education sector through the implementation of best practice industrial relations, change management strategies and staff development, particularly in the area of leadership.	
John Garrard Flynn	For service to the community of the Northern Territory in a range of public sector roles supporting the administration of justice, and through sporting, church and Indigenous welfare organisations.	
John Alexander Fotheringham	For service to the motoring and insurance industries, particularly through leadership roles, the promoting of road safety, and as an advocate for motorists and the community.	
Dr Ann Elizabeth Galbally	For service to the arts as an academic, historian and researcher, particularly through the preservation, development and promotion of Australian art history, as a mentor and author.	
Patrick Andrew Gallagher	For service to the publishing industry through the promotion of Australia's literary culture, as a mentor to emerging writers, and as a contributor to professional organisations.	
Dr Paul Leslie Gardner	For service to the Jewish community through executive roles with organisations fostering interfaith and intercultural relations, and to the promotion and development of human rights and social justice.	
Professor Paul Allen Gatenby	For service to medicine in the field of clinical immunology as a clinician and researcher, to the advancement of medical education, and through professional organisations.	
Ross Roderick Gittins	For service to journalism as a commentator on economic theory, policy and behavioural economics, and to the accountancy profession.	
Professor Vance Xavier Gledhill	For service to computer science as an academic, researcher and administrator, through contributions to the development of computer applications, particularly in the education and health sectors, and to the community.	
Robert John Gleeson	For service to the preservation of the history of the outback, to the promotion of tourism in rural and remote areas, and to education.	
John Reginald Grant	For service to the finance industry, particularly through the promotion of the venture capital sector, and through contributions to medical research and biotechnology organisations.	
Charlie Celestino Gregorini OAM	For service to local government in Western Australia and to the community of the City of Swan.	
Emeritus Professor Paul Grundy	For service to engineering, particularly in the areas of structural stability and fatigue, as an academic and researcher and through executive roles with professional organisations.	
Margaret Dawn Hamilton	For service to the arts through the promotion of children's literature and literacy and through support for authors and illustrators.	
Loftus Wright Harris	For service to economic and regional development in New South Wales, to the promotion of international trade and investment policies, and to the community.	
Olaf Hilmer Hedberg	For service to the spatial information industry within Tasmania and nationally, particularly through contributions to a range of public sector agencies.	
Dr Robert Gurney "Rob" Henzell	For service to agriculture through plant breeding programs to enhance sorghum yield, pest resistance and adaptation to drought stress.	
Dr Joseph George Herbertson	For service to the environment through the development and promotion of sustainable resource processing technologies, particularly in the mining and manufacturing sectors, and as a researcher and educator.	
John "Sinclair" Hill OBE	For service to the community, particularly as a supporter of cultural and Indigenous organisations in Moree.	
Keith Graham Hillness	For service to the electricity supply industry in Queensland, particularly through contribution to restructuring and fostering improved relationships, to regional development, and to the community.	
Professor John Llewelyn Hopper	For service to public health and the biomedical sciences, particularly in the field of genetic epidemiology as an academic and researcher, and to the Australian Twin Registry.	
Margaret Livingston Howden	For service to the community through the Stepfamily Association of Victoria.	
Barry Andrew Irvin	For service to the dairy industry through the management, business development and promotion of cheese products, as an industry spokesperson, and to children with intellectual disabilities and their families.	
Dr Adam Wladyslaw Jamrozik	For service to sociology as an educator, researcher and author, particularly through contributions to social policy in Australia	
Ella Doreen Keenan	For service to business, particularly through executive roles with professional organisations, as a contributor to the promotion and development of women, and to the community.	
Madelyn Lenor "Lyn" Kelman	For service to women living in rural and regional areas, particularly through the Queensland Country Women's Association, and to the community of Emerald.	
Peter Henry Kerr	For service to water polo as a player, referee, coach and administrator, and to the community, particularly through executive positions with a range of sporting and charitable organisations.	
Dr Ross William King	For service to dentistry as a clinician, educator and administrator, particularly in the area of standards and accreditation, and to the community.	
Kevin William Knight	For service to risk management through executive roles with professional associations and as a contributor to the development of principles and practices.	
Dr Diane Linley Langmore	For service in recording the history of social sciences and humanities as General Editor of the Australian Dictionary of Biography.	
Ilona Doreen Lee	For service to the community, particularly in the field of multicultural health care, and to the Jewish community through a range of educational and welfare organisations.	
Grahame James Leonard	For service to the community as an executive member of a range of peak Jewish organisations.	
Susan Margaret Lockwood	For service to the community, particularly women with breast cancer through consumer advocacy and support roles, and the conservation and environmental protection of the Blackburn Lake Sanctuary.	
Anthony Joseph McGrath	For service to the Australian harness racing industry, and to the community through a range of charitable and social welfare organisations.	
Glenn Donald McGrath	For service to cricket as a player and to the community through the establishment of the McGrath Foundation.	
Jane Louise McGrath	For service to community health through support for women with breast cancer and the establishment of the McGrath Foundation.	
Ian Kemball McIvor	For service to the wool and livestock industries through contributions to the expansion of international export markets, improvements to production and marketing practice, and live animal export policy.	
Dr William Taylor McKeith	For service to education through the development and introduction of innovative programs for staff and students, particularly through programs for the intellectually challenged and the gifted.	
Professor John James McNeil	For service to preventive medicine and to epidemiology as a researcher and educator and as a contributor to the development of public health policy.	
Norma Ellen McRae	For service to international relations, particularly through humanitarian aid programs of the Australian Red Cross and other international organisations.	
Erella Florence Macaulay	For service to nursing as an educator and administrator, particularly in relation to the transition of nurse education from hospitals to the tertiary sector in New South Wales.	
Colin Campbell Macfarlane	For service to international relations and to the community through philanthropic support for a range of education and health care initiatives, in particular Operation Cleft and to the Glencoe Foundation.	
Dr John Robert MacGrath	For service to the communities of central and western Victoria through mentoring and leadership roles in business, regional development, tourism and health-related organisations.	
Theo Steven Maras	For service to the building and construction industry in South Australia, and to the Greek community through a range of administrative roles and the promotion of Hellenic culture and tradition in Australia.	
Bernard Marin	For service to accountancy and to the community, particularly through a range of civil liberty, human rights and charitable organisations.	
Douglas James "Jim" Mason	For service to international relations through humanitarian assistance to people in developing countries.	
Lynette Jeane "Lynne" Mason	For service to international relations through humanitarian assistance to people in developing countries.	
Barbara Mary Matt	For service to the community, particularly through the provision of training and employment opportunities, and as a contributor to a range of small business and social welfare organisations in the Bundaberg area.	
Hendrik Meertens	For service to sports aviation, particularly gliding as a competitor and administrator.	
Dr Lorna Faye Melville	For service to veterinary science in the field of virology through research, advisory roles and surveillance programs in the area of arbovirus infection.	
Dr Fergus Mitchell	For service to medicine as a general practitioner, particularly through a range of medical, professional and educational organisations in Tasmania, and to the community of Richmond.	
Professor Francis Neville "Frank" Monsour	For service to dentistry in the field of oral and maxillofacial surgery and education.	
Dr Roger Keith Morris	For service to the adult, continuing and community education sector through practitioner development, research, and professional leadership.	
Dr Raoul Edward "Roly" Nieper	For service to the primary industry sector through the development and implementation of programs and policies in the fields of animal health and welfare, livestock export, and infectious disease control and management.	
John Fenwicke "Jock" Nivison	For service to the beef cattle and sheep breeding industries through contributions to the development of technically advanced and economically competitive livestock production, and through industry organisations.	
Carol Odell	For service to children's literature as an author, scriptwriter and presenter.	
Terence Julian "Terry" O'Mara	For service to the community through public sector organisations and Anglicare in the areas of emergency management, disaster recovery and the provision of welfare services.	
Dr Susan Lunt Page	For service to medicine and to the community through commitment to improving access to health and medical services in rural and remote areas, and through professional, educational and advisory roles.	
William Edward Paradice	For service to conservation and the environment through leadership of a range of research and natural resource management organisations, and to the community of the Hunter region.	
Emeritus Professor Geoffrey George "Geoff" Parr	For service to the visual arts through leadership in the development of tertiary education in Tasmania, research and advisory roles, and as an artist.	
Marilynne Pamela Paspaley	For service to business and commerce through the marketing and promotion of pearls and Australian designed jewellery, and to the community.	
Kenneth Gerald Pegg	For service to horticulture as a research scientist in the field of plant pathology, particularly disease management of tropical and subtropical fruit crops.	
The Reverend Jean Frances Penman	For service to the Anglican Church of Australia through education and pastoral care roles, to international relief efforts and to interfaith understanding.	
Thomas Clive Powell	For service to the finance sector through executive roles with professional organisations, to the development of educational institutions, and through philanthropic support for a range of charitable and medical research bodies.	
Robert Edgar Purves	For service to conservation and the environment through the promotion of, and philanthropic support for, environmental sustainability, particularly the preservation of biological diversity, and to business.	
Dr Dianne Mary Reilly Drury	For service as a contributor to the research, recording and preservation of historic records relating to Charles La Trobe, to promoting relations between France and Australia, and to librarianship.	
Dr Sydney Maxwell Richards	For service to geological science in the areas of mineral exploration, mining and scientific research and through contributions to industry, public sector and professional organisations.	
The Honourable Kevin Richard Rozzoli	For service to the New South Wales Parliament, and to the community of the Greater Western Sydney area through a range of environmental protection, health and welfare, and educational organisations.	
Jonathan Howell Rush	For service to medicine, particularly in the field of orthopaedics, as a clinician, researcher and educator, and through monitoring and review of the quality of surgical care in Victoria.	
Robert Ernest "Bob" Scheuber	For service to the rail transport sector in Queensland, particularly through contributions to regulatory and operational reforms.	
Russell John Schneider	For service to the private health insurance industry through a range of advisory roles, and to the health care system as a contributor to the development and implementation of national policy.	
Michael Monteith Shearer	For service to the community through financial management and governance advisory roles of educational institutions in Adelaide.	
Nancy Lee Sheppard	For service to education, particularly in the field of Anangu culture and language, as a teacher, researcher and author.	
Dr Keith Brian Shilkin	For service to medicine, particularly through the development and administration of public sector pathology services, to professional organisations, and to the Jewish community.	
Commissioner Gregory Robert Smith	For service to industrial relations through conciliation, mediation and arbitration and by assisting employers and employees to achieve fair and effective agreements.	
Kenneth Ross Smith	For service to the dairy industry in South Australia through leadership and advisory roles with a range of organisations.	
The Honourable Warwick Leslie Smith	For service to the Parliament of Australia, to the telecommunications industry as a contributor to reform and debate within the sector, to the promotion of international trade and tourism, and to philanthropy through a range of charitable and community organisations.	
Hans Jeppe Tholstrup	For service to conservation and the environment through the development of renewable energy technology and the exploration of alternative fuel sources.	
Peter Noel Travis	For service to the arts and to innovative visual design as a designer, sculptor, colourist, ceramicist and kite maker, and to tertiary education.	
Emeritus Professor Tony Vinson	For service to social welfare through academic, government and community roles, as a contributor to state and federal policy formulation, and as a champion of social justice.	
David Welsh	For service to the community, particularly through the Lions Eye Health Program - Australia and the Lions Corneal Donation Service.	
Dr Anthony William "Tony" Whiley	For service to horticulture as a research scientist, particularly through the development of disease resistant plants and improved growing, marketing and management practices in the avocado and mango industries.	
Dr Victor Thompson White	For service to medicine in the fields of obstetrics and gynaecology through clinical, teaching and administrative roles and contributions to a range of professional organisations.	
Richard Allan Whittington	For service to the Indigenous community of Wiluna, particularly through the management of health care services and programs to improve education and infrastructure.	
Patrick Aston "Pat" Wilde	For service to the community, particularly through the Millennium Foundation, to the aged care sector through the development of residential facilities, and to heritage, medical and environmental organisations.	
Peter Francis Young	For service to business and commerce, particularly in the areas of finance and investment, and to cultural and environmental organisations.	
The Reverend Professor Victor Yu-Hei Yu	For service to neonatal paediatrics and medical research, particularly through the study of prematurity, to the establishment and development of specialist medical and teaching facilities, and to religion.	

==== Military Division ====
Branch	Recipient	Citation	Notes
Army	Colonel David Peter Coghlan	For exceptional performance of duties as the Deputy Commander, Joint Task Force 633 in Afghanistan and Chief Plans Officer at Headquarters Joint Operations Command.	
Army	Colonel Mark Graham Frendin	For exceptional service as Commanding Officer of The Pilbara Regiment and in senior staff appointments at Land Headquarters and Headquarters Joint Task Force 633.	
Army	Lieutenant Colonel Michael Barry Ryan	For exceptional performance of duties as Commanding Officer of the 1st Reconstruction Task Force deployed to Uruzgan Province, Afghanistan as part of Operation Slipper.	
Army	Colonel Simone Louise Wilkie	For exceptional performance of duty in command appointments within Training Command - Army.	
Air Force	Air Vice-Marshal John Paul Harvey	For exceptional service to the Australian Defence Force and Royal Australian Air Force as the Program Manager, New Air Combat Capability.	
Air Force	Air Commodore David Ernest Tindal	For exceptional service to the Australian Defence Force and Royal Australian Air Force as Director General, Technical Airworthiness.	

=== Medal (OAM) ===
==== General Division ====
Recipient	Citation	Notes
Leslie Frederick "Bunny" Abbott	For service to the community of Lithgow, particularly in Rugby League football as a player, coach, referee, official and timekeeper.	
Dean Hornall Adams	For service to veterans and their families, particularly through the 2/48 Battalion Returned Soldiers Welfare Club.	
Rosemary Helen Aitken	For service to the community through health and welfare organisations in the Eltham district.	
Russell Lawrence Aitken	For service to the communities of the Bellarine Peninsula through a range of youth, environmental, local government, emergency service and church groups.	
James Joseph Altman	For service to the Jewish community and through fostering intercultural understanding.	
Neil Stanley "Stan" Alves	For service to Australian Rules football as a player, coach and commentator, and to the community as a supporter of charitable organisations.	
Peter Warner Anderson	For service to the sport of shooting, particularly pistol shooting, in administrative roles and as a coach and technical adviser.	
Dr Barry John Arnison	For service to education and to the community.	
Arthur Athans	For service to the Greek community of Western Australia through a range of cultural, charitable and media organisations.	
Raymond William Averill	For service to the Uniting Church in Australia through a range of pastoral care roles, and to the community.	
Petrina Roseanne Balmain	For service to the community as a foster carer with Barnardos Australia.	
Dr Michael Patrick Barbato	For service to medicine in the palliative care field.	
Graham Robert Battersby	For service to the community of Henley through a range of sporting, service and youth organisations.	
Dr Arthur "Ray" Beckwith	For service to the Australian wine industry through contributions towards enhancing the quality and efficiency of the winemaking process.	
Darell Henry Benjamin	For service to the community, particularly through fundraising activities for the Royal Children's Hospital Good Friday Appeal.	
Brian David Beyer	For service to the community of Laura and surrounding areas through a range of health, civic, youth and emergency organisations.	
Lieutenant Colonel Anthony Charles Bidgood RFD, ED (Retired)	For service to the community, particularly to the Tasmania Police Pipe Band and through a range of ex-service organisations.	
Ronald Peter Bidwell	For service to business through the establishment of the Australian Sign and Graphics Association, and to the communities of Portland and Fairfield.	
Yvonne Estelle Bird	For service to the community, particularly through the National Boys Choir of Australia and the Heidelberg Ladies' Probus Club.	
Lorraine Blackbourn	For service to the performing arts, particularly through a range of teaching and professional development roles in the field of ballet.	
Dr Andrew Lewis Blair	For service to medicine, particularly in the fields of paediatrics and child protection.	
Beverley Jean Bos	For service to swimming and to the Jewish community.	
Maria Bouzanis	For service to the community through diabetes public awareness and fundraising activities, particularly in association with the Greek community.	
Judith Mercia Boyd	For service to nursing and nurse education, particularly in the area of care delivery to sufferers of a mental illness, to their families and to carers.	
Leonard "Roy" Boyd	For service to athletics as a track and field coach, particularly in the discipline of hurdling, and through a range of professional and amateur sporting organisations.	
John Joseph Brady	For service to the community of the Geelong region through support for a range of charitable, sporting and social welfare organisations.	
John Robert "Bob" Broadfoot	For service to the community through leadership roles within the Federation of Community, Sporting and Workers' Clubs, and to the community of West Wallsend.	
Dr Dennis Brian Brockenshire	For service to water and energy management, to the community of Geelong, and to tertiary education.	
John William Brooker	For service to veterans, particularly through the First Armoured Regiment Association.	
Desmond Thomas "Des" Brown	For service to the community of Warrnambool through ex-service and sporting organisations.	
Raymond John Brown	For service to hockey, particularly in administrative roles.	
Brian Frederick Baltitude	For service to veterans and their families, particularly through the Grafton Sub-Branch of the Returned and Services League of Australia.	
Leslie Underwood "Les" Burdett	For service to the turf management industry as a grounds and ovals curator and through contributions to the development of new grasses and soils technology, and to the community.	
John Frederick Burne	For service to athletics, particularly through a range of executive roles within the Little Athletics Association of New South Wales.	
Lindsay Joseph Butler	For service to country music as a performer, recording artist and producer.	
Henry Elworthy Caldwell QFSM	For service to the community of the Clarence Valley region through a range of emergency service, civic and canine organisations.	
Duguld Campbell Cameron	For service to the Australian beef industry through significant contributions to the establishment of national eating quality standards for beef and through the Australian Lot Feeders Association.	
Philip Donald Cameron	For service to the community, particularly to the welfare of veterans and their families.	
Bessie Jean Carr	For service to youth through the Young Women's Christian Association, and to the community, particularly through support for females participating in sport and recreation.	
Edna May Cartwright	For service to the community through a range of civic, church and service organisations.	
Ivan Joseph Cash	For service to youth, particularly through the Scouting movement.	
Darryl James Clare	For service to the community through the Scouting movement and St John Ambulance Australia.	
Dr Leo Michael Clarebrough	For service to science in the area of metal physics, and to the community through activities supporting youth welfare, aged care, social justice and ecumenical dialogue.	
John Patrick Clarence	For service to local government and to the community of Cessnock.	
Anne Hilary Clarke	For service to the environment and education through the monitoring, conservation, planning, rehabilitation and management of urban waterways.	
Leonard Lloyd Cleal	For service to the community of Goondiwindi, particularly through ex-service, church and social welfare organisations.	
Frances "Frankie" Cleary	For service to the community of Oakey, particularly youth through the Guiding movement.	
Dixie Hickman Cole	For service to special education, particularly through the Miranda Public School, and to the community.	
Aileen Mary Colley	For service to the community, particularly through Meals on Wheels.	
Kathleen Veronica "Kellie" Collins	For service to local government, and to the community of Blacktown through a range of sporting, charitable and civic organisations.	
David John Cooper	For service to the community through veterans' organisations, and to the Army Cadet movement.	
Marie Janice Cornish	For service to women's cricket as a player, coach and administrator, and to the community of Wellington.	
Kenneth John "Ken" Coventry	For service to local government, particularly the Rural City of Murray Bridge, and to the community through a range of civic, sporting and service groups.	
Maxwell Cramer	For service to maritime history and to the community of Geraldton.	
Dr Rosemary Creswell	For service to literature, particularly through the promotion and support of Australian writers.	
Frederick Cunliffe	For service to the community, particularly as a general practitioner and obstetrician in the Nepean region.	
Douglas John Curtis	For service to education, particularly through the development of a range of programs and initiatives at Lucindale Area School and Roxby Downs Area School, and to the community.	
Elizabeth Mary Daly	For service to education in Tasmania, particularly in the areas of early childhood education, language development and policy implementation, and to the community.	
Barry James Davies	For service to the community through executive roles with the National Heart Foundation of Australia.	
Stanley Dawson	For service to the community, particularly through Lions Clubs International.	
Suzanne Judith Denison	For service to nursing as a nurse practitioner, and to the community of the Nundle district.	
Harry Albert Dibley	For service to the community, particularly through the establishment of support groups for men through the Anglican Church.	
John Desmond Dillon	For service to the community of Bruny Island, particularly through civic, local government, planning and development groups.	
Norman Roy Drogemuller	For service to arbitration and mediation, particularly in the areas of architecture and construction, and to the community.	
Richard James Embelton	For service to the welfare of veterans and their families, particularly through the Geelong Veterans' Welfare Centre.	
Leslie Erdi	For service to the community through philanthropic contributions to educational, charitable and Jewish organisations.	
Beresford Dan Evans	For service to the coal and sugar industries, particularly through the design and manufacture of innovative equipment, and to the community of Ipswich.	
Dr Harald Falge	For service to young people within the community of Cairns through the provision of support services to those who are homeless.	
Cantor Shimon Farkas	For service to the Jewish community, particularly as the Cantor of the Central Synagogue, Sydney.	
Susan Feller	For service to children with intellectual disabilities, particularly through The Joseph Varga School.	
Ronald Claude Fisher	For service to the community of Canberra, particularly through the Australia Day in the National Capital Committee.	
Hugo Fitz-Herbert	For service to country music and to the community.	
Alexander Geoffrey Floyd	For service to botany, particularly through research and identification of sub-tropical rainforest plants and through support for the North Coast Regional Botanic Gardens, and to conservation and environmental education.	
Dr Choong Khean Foo	For service to medicine as a general practitioner, educator and advocate of traditional Chinese medicine, and to the community.	
Ross Bernard Fowler	For service to local government, and to the community of Penrith through a range of service and disabled care organisations.	
John Stirling Fraser	For service to surf lifesaving through a range of executive roles.	
Christopher "John" Freeman	For service to aviation through the development of safe low flying techniques in the agricultural sector.	
Dr Samuel Gedor Friedman	For service to the Jewish community through a range of executive, support and fundraising roles, particularly with The Yeshiva Centre.	
George Paul Friend	For service to the community, particularly through the Rotary Club of Broadwater Southport, and to veterans.	
Raffaela Galati-Brown	For service to education and to Indigenous youth as the Principal of Northland Secondary College.	
John Athol Galloway	For service to the community of Tamworth through a range of youth, service and church organisations.	
Helen June Genders	For service to the community through fundraising activities with health and service organisations, and to music.	
Fay Elizabeth Gerard	For service to the community as a fundraiser for a range of organisations, including the Adelaide Appeals Committee.	
Robert Edwin "Ted" Gillies	For service to the community, particularly through a range of roles with Rotary International.	
Maureen Louise Gleeson	For service to nursing, particularly through the care of those diagnosed with breast cancer.	
William Bede Gleeson	For service to the community through music.	
Tibor Gonczol	For service to the sport of shooting, particularly pistol shooting, in administrative roles and as a judge and coach.	
Donald Henry Goodsir	For service to the community, particularly through environmental preservation and heritage organisations.	
Hugh Chapman Grant	For service to the law through the Queensland Law Society, and to the community of Rockhampton.	
Ian John Grant	For service to surf lifesaving, particularly through the promotion and development of first aid techniques.	
Bruce William Greenland	For service to health, particularly palliative care, and to the community.	
Chester Edwin Hallam	For service to veterans and their families through Veterans Support and Advocacy Service Australia.	
Paul Clement Hammond	For service to the development and promotion of dance, particularly ballet, as a performer, choreographer and teacher.	
Nicholas John Hampton	For service to the community through a range of charitable organisations supporting people with physical, intellectual and emotional disabilities, and to the music industry.	
Virginia Marion Hansen	For service to the community through charitable organisations supporting cancer and mental health research.	
Robyn Jean Hanson	For service to people with disabilities in the field of sport and recreation.	
Narelle Hargreaves	For service to education, particularly in the areas of child and teacher development and welfare, and through a range of executive roles with professional organisations.	
Dr Robin Jennifer Harvey	For service to the community through contributions to national classifications standards, and to child psychology and community health.	
Ronald Leonard Harvey	For service to baseball, particularly as a coach educator and instructor, as a selector and to junior player development.	
Margaret Peg Harwood	For service to the community of Geeveston through aged care, church and heritage organisations.	
Ian Conway Hay	For service to the community through the Catholic Church and aged care services in the Canberra region.	
Margo Hebbard	For service to youth through the Guiding movement, and to the community of Ryde.	
M'liss Nellandra Henry	For service to people with disabilities, particularly through the provision of equestrian activities for young people, and to the community.	
Ailsa Rosemary Hill-Ling	For service to the community, particularly through St Ann's College.	
William Holmes	For service to the community, particularly through the hearing dogs program of Lions Australia.	
William James Howitt	For service to the community of Narranderra, particularly through the provision of support for people with disabilities and through a range of church, service and educational organisations.	
Nevin Willard Hughes	For service to health in rural and remote areas through a range of executive and advisory roles, to local government, and to the community.	
Judith Anne Hunter	For service to veterans and their families through the Naval Association of Australia and the Women's Royal Australian Navy Service.	
John Charles Hutchinson RFD, ED	For service to the community of the Gippsland region through executive roles with a range of organisations, to tertiary education, and to the energy industry.	
Donald William Ingram	For service to education, particularly the Mentone Grammar School and through support for professional organisations, and to the community.	
Dr John Roger James	For service to architecture as a practitioner, educator and historian, particularly as a leading scholar on French Gothic architectural history.	
Yvonne Gladys Jenkins	For service to the communities of Lithgow and Rydal, particularly through a range of historical, agricultural show and arts bodies.	
Donald Stewart Johnston	For service to lawn bowls through a range of administrative roles, and to the community.	
Edward Ernest Johnston	For service to the community of Merredin, particularly as an honorary auditor to a range of local organisations.	
Leslie William Jones	For service to the community through the Y Service Club of Bendigo.	
Cyril Kalippa	For service to the development of the community of the Tiwi Islands.	
Jane Turley Keir	For service to nursing, particularly in the field of palliative care, and to the community of the Walgett Shire and surrounds.	
David Maxwell Keith	For service to the community of Taralga, particularly through aged care and a range of church, sporting and civic groups.	
Yvonne Mary Kelley	For service to the preservation of healthcare history in central Queensland, and to the community of Rockhampton.	
Albert Edward Kellock	For service to the community of Shepparton through a range of roles with service, charitable, social welfare and local government organisations.	
William Joseph Kelly	For service to the arts as a visual artist, and to urban design.	
Professor David James Kemp	For service to medical research as a molecular biologist, particularly in the areas of tropical health and infectious diseases, through contributions to Indigenous health and to professional organisations.	
James Thomas Kennett	For service to the community of Bombala, particularly through organisations that support the welfare of veterans and their families.	
The Honourable Daniel Eric Kent	For service to the community of the Gippsland district through a range of church, historical and sporting groups, and to the Parliament of Victoria.	
Ruth MacNeill Kerruish	For service to horticulture as a teacher, author and publisher, particularly in the area of plant protection, and to the community.	
Ronda Lilian Kimble	For service to netball as a competitor, coach, umpire and administrator.	
Betty Ann Kitchener	For service to the community through the development of the Mental Health First Aid Program.	
Dr David Komesaroff	For service to medicine as an anaesthetist, particularly through innovations in the areas of pain relief and resuscitation and the training of rural general practitioners.	
Joan Ida Kreiser	For service to the community, particularly through a range of local government, fundraising and civic roles in the Mannum area.	
Rosalie Meredith Kuhlmann	For service to remote education, particularly through support for Indigenous students and children with special needs in the Northern Territory.	
Dr Arunachalam Lakshmanan	For service to medicine and the community of Holbrook as a general practitioner and through a range of philanthropic activities.	
Jennifer Stuart Lamb	For service to art as Director of the Goulburn Regional Art Gallery, and to the community.	
David Evatt Landa	For service to the law in New South Wales through judicial and mediation roles, and to the community.	
Dr Colin Robert Laverty	For service to medicine in the fields of gynaecological cytology and histopathology, particularly through the advancement of cervical screening services in Australia and through developments in establishing the role of the human papillomavirus in the genesis of cervical cancer; and to art, particularly Indigenous art both in Australia and overseas.	
Nancy Eunice Lawson	For service to the community, particularly through the Moorabbin Hospital Ladies' Auxiliary.	
Raymond John Leeson	For service to the print media as editor of the Goulburn Post, and to the community.	
Charlotte Isabell Leung	For service to the community as a social worker in the area of mental health, particularly through management and advisory roles in public and private sector mental health organisations.	
Geoffrey Robert Levey	For service to veterans and their families, particularly through the Sunbury Sub-Branch of the Returned and Services League of Australia and the Melton and District Sub-Branch of the Vietnam Veterans Association of Australia.	
Ruth Elaine Lilian	For service to the community, particularly through event management, administrative roles in medical professional bodies and a range of Jewish organisations.	
Alexander James Lillie	For service to the communities of Lilydale and Mount Evelyn through a range of ex-service, local government and community service organisations.	
David John Lindh	For service to business, particularly within the resources and energy sectors as a company director, and to equestrian sport.	
Grahame Robert Lindsay	For service to the Indigenous community of the Nauiya Nambiya region.	
Sister Elizabeth Little	For service to education in the Northern Territory, particularly through Indigenous staff support roles.	
Sister Helen Mary Little	For service to education, particularly in the Northern Territory, to religious life through the Daughters of Our Lady of the Sacred Heart, and to the community of Darwin.	
The Reverend Neville "Keith" Little	For service to the community through the development and practice of clinical pastoral education, and to ecumenism.	
Mark Hugh Lloyd	For service to the tourism and hospitality industry as a contributor to the development of the McLaren Vale region as a premium wine and food tourism destination, as a wine maker, and to the arts.	
Barry Stewart Lodge	For service to the community through the Royal Flying Doctor Service of Australia.	
Margaret Ellen "Mandy" Loton	For service to the community through support and fundraising for a range of arts, charitable, cultural and heritage groups.	
Ian John Lovegreen	For service to the youth, particularly through Volunteers for Isolated Students Education.	
Vicki Anne Lovegreen	For service to the youth, particularly through Volunteers for Isolated Students Education.	
Emeritus Professor Harold Roger Lovell	For service to business and commerce through the food and packaging sector, particularly as an advocate for education and training.	
Jennifer "Kerry" Lovering	For service to the status of women, particularly through the Women's Electoral Lobby.	
Beverley Helen Lowe	For service to the community through a range of social welfare and disability support organisations.	
John Lowe	For service to the community through the provision of social welfare services.	
Patricia Mae Lummis	For service to the community of Gilgandra through a range of social welfare, charitable and sporting organisations.	
Carolyn Jane Lyons	For service to rural communities, particularly in the area of health and through activities with the Sisters of Charity Outreach.	
Barbara Eileen McCarthy	For service to the community of Chatswood through business, arts and charitable organisations.	
Joyce Olga McCarthy	For service to the community of Illawarra, particularly in the areas of local history and heritage preservation.	
Glenda Joy McChesney-Clark	For service to the community, particularly through the Council on the Ageing Queensland.	
Elizabeth Agnes "Aggie" McClutchey	For service to the community of the Taree region, particularly through the development of the Flair Fashion Awards and support for emerging fashion designers.	
Despa McDonnell	For service to the Greek community through the Castellorizian Ladies Association of Western Australia and a range of historical, sporting and youth organisations.	
Linda Jane McGillivray	For service to children, particularly through the Guiding movement, to young people with a disability, and to the Uniting Church in Australia.	
Gregory John McIntyre RFD	For service to people with disabilities, and to public education through the Technical and Further Education sector.	
Leslie John McIntyre	For service to Rugby League football, particularly as inaugural Chairman of the Canberra Raiders Rugby League Football Club.	
Sandra "Sandy" McKellar	For service to nursing in the area of cardiac rehabilitation as a clinician and educator and through contributions to professional bodies.	
Margery McWilliam	For service to women's golf in New South Wales as a referee and administrator.	
Kenneth Raymond Maguire	For service to young people, particularly through the Scouting movement, and to the community as a philanthropist.	
Patrick Leslie Maley	For service to the horseracing industry, and to the community of the Bega Valley Shire.	
Betty Malone	For service to the community through the research and documentation of the history of Prahran and surrounding areas.	
Peter Mandelj	For service to the Slovenian community, particularly through the Council of Slovenian Organisations of Australia.	
Janet Elizabeth Marchant	For service to the community, particularly people with a visual impairment, through the provision of print-handicapped radio services.	
Lina Marrocco	For service to the community, particularly through fundraising roles supporting medical research and educational organisations.	
Sofia Mastoris	For service to the Greek community in Victoria, particularly through the Pan Hellenic Women's Federation.	
Robert William Maxwell	For service to the community of Narrogin through a range of aged welfare, local government, civic, and sporting organisations.	
Major Henry MacDonald May	For service to the community and Australian Defence Force personnel through The Salvation Army.	
Jacqueline Anne "Jackie" Menzies	For service to the visual arts through the study, preservation and promotion of Asian art in Australia, particularly in curatorial roles at the Art Gallery of New South Wales.	
Christine Elizabeth Meredith	For service to children with a learning disability and their families, particularly through the Australian Dyspraxia Association.	
Douglas Charles Miller	For service to the community through a range of amateur photographic and church organisations.	
Associate Professor Eugen Molodysky	For service to medical education, particularly in the areas of general practice, through clinical teaching, curriculum and professional development and research into cervical cancer prevention.	
David Moore	For service to agriculture, particularly through the seed and grain industry, and to the community of Gawler.	
Joan Bridget Moore	For service to the community, particularly through the Queensland Branch of the Australian Pensioners' and Superannuants' League.	
Robert George Moran	For service to the community through the establishment of the Myeloma Foundation of Australia and support for people with cancer and their families.	
Annette Morris	For service to international relations through the provision of consular services at the Australian High Commission, Singapore.	
Lorna Frances Morris	For service to the community of Numurkah, particularly through a range of church and sporting organisations, and to the provision of support services for users of the magistrates court system.	
Dr Michael John Mullany	For service to the community of Young, particularly in the areas of aged care and disability support.	
Joyce May Mulligan	For service to the community, particularly through the Trefoil Guild and the Guiding movement.	
Anita Lucia Narduzzo	For service to community health, particularly through the activities of the Royal Melbourne Hospital Dialysis Support Group.	
Joel Jacob Nathan	For service to the community through the establishment of organisations to support people with cancer and through the development and training of health and allied care professionals.	
Marion Jean Neil	For service to the community through organisations providing care for aged people and for children.	
Marie-Claire Nemec	For service to the community through historical, seniors, civic and aged care organisations in the Cairns area, and to accountancy.	
John Francis Newnham	For service to the community, particularly in aged care, Australian Red Cross and Lions.	
James Henry Nichol	For service to the community of Canberra as a volunteer with a range of organisations.	
Kenneth William Nicholls	For service to the community through the Rotary Australia World Community Service and the Rotary Club of Granville.	
Peter John Norman	For service to the law, particularly through contributions in the areas of crime prevention, forensic science and offender welfare.	
Robert Reginald Oatley	For service to Australian Rules football as a coach and as a contributor to the development of younger players.	
Irene Thelma O'Brien	For service to the community through The Girls' Brigade Victoria, particularly in the Rosanna and West Heidelberg areas.	
Therese O'Brien	For service to the community of Toowoomba through a range of social welfare services.	
Sean Leonard O'Mara	For service to the welfare of veterans’ and their families, particularly through the Mackay Veterans Support Group.	
Jennifer Isobel O'Sullivan	For service to the community as a speech pathologist, particularly to people with hearing impairments and as a contributor to the development of cognitive thinking techniques.	
Julie Otremba	For service to the community of Yanchep and Two Rocks through a range of civic, welfare, sporting and educational bodies.	
Fay Catherine Owens	For service to the community of central Queensland through a range of health care, educational, charitable, church and local government organisations.	
Mary Gemma Pagani	For service to the community, particularly the terminally ill, through the provision of pastoral care.	
Jeffrey William Parish	For service to the irrigation industry through the development and implementation of water delivery services and through contributions to efficient resource management, and to the community.	
Stephen William Parish	For service to the publishing industry, particularly through the publication of nature photography.	
Leslie William Parrott	For service to lawn bowls, particularly through the Newcastle District Bowling Association.	
Geoffrey Robert Patch	For service to local government through the Crows Nest Shire Council, and to the community.	
Dr Colin Lindsay Pate	For service to the rural community of Bombala.	
The Very Reverend Edward Ross Pearsons	For service to the Presbyterian Church of Australia as Moderator-General, and to the community through the provision of pastoral care.	
Anthony Maxwell Pederick	For service to local government, to business, and to the community through a range of educational, financial and youth organisations.	
Timothy George Peken	For service to the law, and to the community through a range of executive and voluntary roles with alumni, business and sporting organisations.	
Helen Blanche Pointon	For service to the community, particularly through roles supporting women's and children's organisations in South Australia.	
Mavis Lillian Pope	For service to the community, particularly through fundraising activities supporting the Royal Children's Hospital, Melbourne.	
Kay Evelyn Poustie	For service to the library and information services sector, and to the community through the Zonta International movement and aged welfare.	
William Kenneth Pride	For service to sailing, particularly the development and promotion of the sport, to Australian Rules football, and to the community of Hobsons Bay.	
Dr James Morris Purchas	For service to medicine as a general practitioner and anaesthetist in Canberra and Young, and to the community through the recording and documentation of the history of Graduates of the Faculty of Medicine at Sydney University.	
Dr Douglas Ratcliff	For service to the community, particularly through the delivery of information technology assistance to staff and students of the Albany Creek State School.	
Elizabeth Anne Paupach	For service to the visual and performing arts, particularly in the areas of education, administration and training.	
Dr Oliver John Raymond	For service to the Canberra region through a range of community organisations.	
Colin Campbell Read	For service to the community of Noarlunga through a range of aged welfare, service and local government organisations, and to Technical and Further Education in South Australia.	
John Morgan Redden	For service to aged care, and to the community of Coonabarabran.	
Bruno Riccio	For service to the community through philanthropic roles in support of medical research organisations, and to the Italian community.	
Marion Oribin Rick	For service to the communities of Mission Beach and Innisfail through a range of women's, educational and civic organisations.	
Hugh "John" Ritchie	For service to the community of Taree, particularly through service groups and surf lifesaving.	
Pamela Margaret Rivers	For service to people with disabilities, and to the community through a range of civic, church and political organisations.	
Esther Mary Roadnight	For service to the community of Kalgoorlie and region, particularly through a range of social, business, youth, tourism and cultural organisations, and to local government.	
Colonel Francis Adrian Roberts (Retired)	For service to veterans in the Australian Capital Territory, particularly through the Totally and Permanently Incapacitated Association.	
Frank Robinson	For service to the welfare of aged citizens, particularly through the Grey Power Association, and to the community of Gunnedah.	
Dr Herbert Norman "Herc" Rose	For service to medicine as a general practitioner in the Newcastle area.	
Alfons Martin Rosenstrauss	For service to medical research though the establishment and management of the Rebecca L Cooper Medical Research Foundation.	
Associate Professor Suzanne Dorothy Rutland	For service to Jewish education and history through a range of higher education development roles and as an author and academic, and to the promotion of interfaith relations.	
Sister Helen Margaret Ryan	For service to the community, particularly in the field of choral music.	
Thelma Loraine Ryan	For service to the community of Berrigan through a range of social welfare, church and aged care organisations.	
Julie Susan Sattler	For service to the personnel recruitment and consulting sectors, and to the community.	
Professor Michael Gifford Sawyer	For service to medicine in the field of child and adolescent mental health as a researcher and educator, particularly through contributions to the design of new programs of intervention and through the promotion of community awareness.	
Kenneth Mark Schneider	For service to the community, particularly young people, through St John Ambulance Australia.	
Frank Lawrence Scicluna	For service to the Maltese community, particularly through the teaching and preservation of the Maltese language, and to multicultural education.	
Helen Margaret Scott	For service to local government, particularly through the Australian Local Government Women's Association, and to the community of the Southern Midlands region of Tasmania.	
Rosemary Elizabeth "Rosie" Scott	For service to the community of Murray Bridge, particularly through the establishment of an employment and training program to support individuals with a disability.	
Ellen Marjorie Seagrave	For service to the community of Emmaville through a range of health, education and church organisations.	
Leslie John Searle	For service to natural resource management, to primary industry, and to the community of Ayr.	
Winnifred Anne "Win" Secombe	For service to the community of Wauchope through a range of health, aged care, women's, church, service and charitable organisations.	
Clement George Senior	For service to the community of Marion through local government, ex-service and youth organisations.	
Dr Leo Francis Shanahan	For service to medicine in the field of ophthalmology as a pioneer of new ophthalmic surgical techniques and through the provision of eye care services in the Canberra region and in remote Indigenous communities.	
Albert Brinsley Sheridan	For service to the community of the Port Stephens region through a range of health, aged care, service and local government organisations.	
Robert Alan Shirlaw	For service to rowing as a coach, administrator and competitor, and to education.	
Dr Robert William "Bob" Sillar	For service to medicine, particularly as a practitioner and educator in the field of surgical oncology and melanoma, as a general surgeon and through the provision of humanitarian surgical aid overseas..	
Ronald Joseph Skeen	For service to the community through Lions International.	
The Venerable Peter James Smart	For service to the Anglican Church of Australia through administrative, educational and ministry roles.	
Adrienne Mary Smith	For service to sports administration, particularly in the area of sport for people with a disability.	
John Francis "Jack" Smith	For service to the community of Winnaleah through civic, local government, health and sporting organisations.	
Robert Charles Snedden	For service to conservation and the environment, and to the printing industry.	
William Breen Sole	For service to education, particularly through contributions to school sport.	
Peter Melville Speirs	For service to local government, and to the community of Temora.	
Leonard Spira	For service to music, particularly as a contributor to the early development of opera in Melbourne and through establishing and directing a range of musical groups in Sydney and the Noosa district.	
Jennifer Staddon	For service to the community through the Scouting movement, particularly youth in remote areas of north west Queensland.	
Ronald Edward Stafford	For service to the community of the Bega Shire through a range of community organisations.	
Lorraine "Anne" Steel	For service to the community of Parkes through the establishment of the Elvis Festival and through a range of other community organisations.	
Robert John Steel	For service to the community of Parkes through the establishment of the Elvis Festival and through a range of other community organisations.	
Brenda Mary Stewart	For service to the community of Bentleigh through a range of church and charitable organisations.	
Michael Stewart	For service to the community of Bentleigh through a range of church and charitable organisations.	
Dr William Orrock Stewart	For service to medicine as a general practitioner, and to the community of Lang Lang.	
Colleen Olive Stock	For service to education in rural and remote areas, particularly through Volunteers for Isolated Students' Education.	
Margaret "Kay" Strickland	For service to the community, particularly through palliative care support services.	
Marie Eveline Stubbs	For service to the community through a range of youth, ex-service and other community groups.	
David Ritchie Summers	For service to the construction industry, particularly in the field of quantity surveying and through leadership of professional bodies.	
Merilyn Helen Syme	For service to the community, particularly through the Victorian Canine Association.	
Deborah Eugene Tabart	For service to the conservation, management and protection of koalas and their habitat through the Australian Koala Foundation.	
Francis Ray Taggart	For service to the community of the Manning Valley, particularly through the promotion of business development in the region.	
Allan "George" Taylor	For service to the community of Warrnambool, particularly through a range of sporting organisations.	
Neil Warren Terrill	For service to conservation and the environment, particularly in the Gippsland region, through chemical science education, water conservation and treatment and ecological sustainability.	
Francis Reginald Thompson	For service to the community through a range of civic, health and local government organisations.	
Harry Edward Thompson	For service to the Uniting Church in Australia through administrative roles at local and state level, and to the community of Corinda.	
Ronald Albert Tindall	For service to sport, particularly through the development of football and through the education and development of sports coaches.	
Leslie Raymond Tobler	For service to the community, particularly through the Construction Industry Drug and Alcohol Foundation and through the Building Trades Group Drug and Alcohol Committee.	
Dorothea Anne Tom	For service to the community of Parkes through support for a range of charitable, cultural and historical organisations.	
Michael Robert Torney BM	For service to the community, particularly through the La Trobe University Students' Union, and to tertiary sector professional associations.	
Dr Kevin Treston	For service to Catholic education, particularly in the areas of leadership, school renewal, teacher and curriculum development and through contributions to theological and pastoral care programs.	
Brian Kenrick Tucker	For service to the sport of cycling as a coach, administrator and competitor.	
Valerie Anne Tuckett	For service to nursing, particularly as an administrator and through the promotion of nurse education and professional health services.	
Tasha Vanos	For service to the Greek community, particularly through the Australasian Hellenic Educational Progressive Association and through the promotion of Hellenic culture and traditions in Australia.	
David Norman Vendy	For service to local government, and to the community of Ballarat.	
Katariina Vernham	For service to the community of Port Hedland through a range of local government, Indigenous support and sporting organisations.	
Trevor Anthony Vincent	For service to athletics as a competitor, administrator and selector and through support for the development of young athletes.	
Dr Vindigni	For service to community health, particularly through the establishment and provision of a range of voluntary services and training programs for disadvantaged people in the Asian-Pacific through Hands on Health Australia, and as a chiropractor through clinical practice and support for community education programs.	
Noel Reginald Viney	For service to the community through a range of horticulture, service, surf lifesaving and sporting organisations.	
Berta Frances von Bibra	For service to the community, particularly through administrative roles with a range of political, legal and medical organisations.	
Ivan Albert Vonhoff	For service to the Lutheran Church of Australia, to the dairy industry through a range of executive roles, and to the community.	
Kathleen Anne Waddell	For service to the community as a church organist, choir director and music teacher.	
Dr Julie Anne Waddy	For service to the community through linguistic and ethnobiological research of Indigenous culture on Groote Eylandt.	
Paul Vincent Wakim	For service to the community through contributions to a range of migration and multicultural organisations, and to the law.	
Jeannine Patricia Walsh	For service to the teleservices sector, particularly through the Australian Teleservices Association and in the promotion of industry best practice.	
Brian Desmond Ward	For service to the community, particularly through a range of executive roles with the Australian Red Cross.	
Trevor "Phillip" Ward	For service to the community of Ryde through a range of youth, musical, church and educational organisations.	
Leonard Norman Webb	For service to the film industry, particularly through the Motion Picture Industry Benevolent Society of New South Wales.	
Mavis Lillian Webb	For service to the community of Glenorchy through a range of voluntary roles with the Glenorchy Primary School.	
Dr Cameron Keith Webber	For service to medicine as a general practitioner and as a fundraiser for a range of health organisations, and to education through the Australian National University Medical School.	
Alasdair Paine Webster	For service to the Parliament of Australia, and to the community through Indigenous, educational and service organisations.	
Primrose Irene Werkmeister	For service to the Sri Lankan community, particularly as a fundraiser for the disadvantaged.	
Captain Peter William Wertheimer RFD (Retired)	For service to the community, particularly veterans, as convenor of Reserve Forces Day commemorations and through the Defence Reserves Association.	
Marcel Weyland	For service to the Polish community in Australia and internationally through the preservation and promotion of Polish cultural heritage, particularly literature.	
Roy Hamilton Whitecross	For service to the welfare of veterans and their families, particularly through the Headquarters 8th Division Association, and to the community.	
Jean Mary Whitla	For service to the community of Wodonga, particularly through local history, youth and media organisations.	
Neville James Whitley	For service to sport, particularly through administrative roles involving Australian Rules football, to the licensed club industry, and to the community of Geelong.	
Dr Ubeyasiri Wijeyananda Wickrama	For service to the Sri Lankan community of New South Wales.	
Monica Wilkinson	For service to medicine, particularly as an audiologist and through the establishment of programs for the screening of hearing and diagnosis of hearing loss in newborn babies.	
Deidre Ann Williams	For service to the arts as an administrator for a range of arts organisations in South Australia, to the development of arts policy, and through support for youth arts and children's theatre.	
Maxwell Norman Williams	For service to local government, and to the community through a range of aged care, sporting, emergency service and school organisations.	
Stephen Paul Williams	For service to football, and to the Greek community.	
Rosemary Wilson	For service to the Guiding movement, and to the community of West Epping.	
John Philip Woodruff	For service to the popular music industry, particularly as a manager, promoter and mentor of musical acts.	
Dr Arthur Frederick Woods	For service to medicine in the field of anaesthetics as a clinician, teacher and examiner, and to the community.	
Trevor John Wortley	For service to the community, particularly through support for men diagnosed with prostate cancer and their families.	
Berenice Deirdre Wright	For service to the community of Mackay as a local historian and through volunteer roles with health care, church and civic organisations.	
Barry Hanry Young	For service to the community of Albury through support for a range of youth, service and aged care organisations.	
Graeme Arthur Young	For service to youth through the development and support of primary school football.	

==== Military Division ====
Branch	Recipient	Citation	Notes
Navy	Commander Stephen John Bowater	For meritorious service to the Royal Australian Navy in the field of Operations.	
Navy	Lieutenant Commander Gordon William Burns RAN	For meritorious service to the Royal Australian Navy, particularly as the Fleet Exercise Program Coordinator.	
Navy	Commander Ian Arthur Pickering RAN	For meritorious service to the Royal Australian Navy and the Australian Defence Organisation in a variety of operational and support roles.	
Navy	Chief Petty Officer Penny Valerie Stone	For meritorious service as the Fleet Petty Officer Dental in support of Maritime operational capability, and for outstanding achievement in the development of Australian Defence Force Dental Auxiliary operational training and new career structures.	
Navy	Chief Petty Officer Peter James Strzelecki	For meritorious service to the Royal Australian Navy as a Marine Technician, particularly as the Senior Technical Officer aboard HMAS WOLLONGONG and Armidale Class Patrol Boat Crew ATTACK FIVE.	
Army	Warrant Officer Class One Robert Charles Davidson	For meritorious service to the Australian Army in the field of Supply Chain Management.	
Army	Warrant Officer Class Two Roderick Edwin Mason	For meritorious service as the Australian Defence Force Academy Band Sergeant Major and as a member of the Australian Army Band Corps.	
Army	Warrant Officer Class One Graham Athol Turner	For meritorious service as the Artificer Sergeant Major of the 162nd Reconnaissance Squadron and as the Artificer Sergeant Major of the 171st Aviation Squadron.	
Air Force	Wing Commander James Dennis Hood	For meritorious service to the Royal Australian Air Force in the field of major capital acquisition associated with the P-3C Maritime Aircraft Upgrade and Airborne Early Warning and Control.	
Air Force	Wing Commander Anthony Michael O'Leary	For meritorious service to the Royal Australian Air Force in the field of operational sustainment.	
Air Force	Squadron Leader Jeffrey Charles Stephenson	For meritorious service to the Royal Australian Air Force in the field of base and operational health support within the Air Force Specialist Reserve.	

== Meritorious Service ==
=== Public Service Medal (PSM) ===
Public Service Medal ribbon

State/ Territory	Recipient	Citation	Notes
Aust.	Dr Fadwa Musa Al-Yaman	For outstanding public service in improving the accuracy and reliability of the data on Indigenous Australians contained in information collections for health, housing and community services.	
Aust.	Rebecca Jane Allnutt	For outstanding public service in the delivery of improved hearing health in the Northern Territory, particularly amongst Indigenous communities.	
Aust.	Robert "Ian" Campbell	For outstanding public service in the administration of electoral processes in Australia and in the development and implementation of improved entitlements for Australia's veteran community.	
Aust.	Dermot David Casey	For outstanding public service in improving medical and psychological health services for people in immigration detention.	
Aust.	Andrew Frank Close	For outstanding public service in the development and use of computer based systems to model water quality and water supply management within the Murray Darling Basin.	
Aust.	Judith Elizabeth Flanagan	For outstanding public service in the development and implementation of the Active After School Communities Program.	
Aust.	Dr Martin Lee Parkinson	For outstanding public service as a key contributor to the 2007 Report of the Task Group on Emissions Trading and, more broadly, to Australia's economic and financial relations.	
Aust.	Susan Joy Pidgeon	For outstanding public service in the development and implementation of a range of government funded services that assist families to build stronger relationships or those who are affected by family separation, particularly the establishment of Family Relationship Centres across Australia.	
Aust.	Finn Axel Pratt	For outstanding public service in the development and implementation of significant and innovative reforms to public employment services and workplace relations in Australia.	
Aust.	Peter Alan Quiggin	For outstanding public service in delivering the government's legislative agenda at a time of significant legislative change and in a number of critical areas.	
Aust.	John Anthony Ryan	For outstanding public service as head of the Secretariat for the Prime Minister's Review of Uranium Mining, Processing and Nuclear Energy and in the development of policy in a range of critical areas, including energy reform, climate change and resources development.	
Aust.	Joan Beatrice Savic	For outstanding public service in the promotion and facilitation of best practice in privacy and freedom of information in Centrelink and throughout the Australian Public Service.	
Aust.	David Gordon Southgate	For outstanding public service in the development and management of the Australian Government's aviation environment reform initiatives, in particular the Transparent Noise Information Package software.	
Aust.	George Ernest Veitch	For outstanding public service in the field of financial management and budgeting.	
Aust.	Ruth Evelyn Weston	For outstanding public service as a researcher and contributor to policy development, particularly in the areas of separation and divorce, family law, family relationships, fertility decision making and child support.	
NSW	Noel Humphrey Bowden	For outstanding public service in promoting the rights of people with an intellectual disability.	
NSW	Louise Ann Bye	For outstanding public service in enhancing the quality of education to Indigenous people in New South Wales.	
NSW	Colleen Dorn Dreis	For outstanding public service to the Legal Service Branch of the NSW Department of Housing.	
NSW	Brian Alexander Given	For outstanding public service to the Office of Fair Trading within the NSW Department of Commerce.	
NSW	Margaret Emily Hughes	For outstanding public service to education in New South Wales, particularly to the Dubbo School of Distance Education.	
NSW	Mark Kevin Johnston	For outstanding public service to the National Parks and Wildlife Service of New South Wales, particularly on issues involving Indigenous communities.	
NSW	Colin Arthur Judge	For outstanding public service to Sydney Water, particularly in media relations.	
NSW	Barbara Ann Richardson	For outstanding public service to natural resource management and environment protection in New South Wales.	
NSW	Peter Gregory Rowley	For outstanding public service to the State Transit Authority in New South Wales.	
NSW	David Spiteri	For outstanding public service to rail transport in New South Wales, particularly to safety and consumer service.	
NSW	Judith Anne Walker	For outstanding public service to the development of family law in Australia.	
VIC	John Herbert Eddy	For outstanding public service to education in Victoria, particularly in mentoring of staff and classroom teaching.	
VIC	Aneette Maree Godfrey-Magee	For outstanding public service in the education of students with vision impairments.	
VIC	Robert Bruce Read	For outstanding public service in assisting victims of crime, particularly for providing a direct and supportive environment at the time of crisis and in the long term.	
VIC	William Kenneth Wooton	For outstanding public service to Victoria's livestock industries and animal health.	
QLD	Barry James Blaney	For outstanding public service in the research and the development of enhanced production processes in primary industries.	
QLD	Denis Arthur Byrnes	For outstanding public service to local government.	
QLD	Sophie Mary Dwyer	For outstanding public service in the field of environmental health.	
QLD	Geoffrey Graham Rowbotham	For outstanding public service to the development of adult education initiatives within Training and Further Education.	
QLD	Emeritus Professor Michael Ward	For outstanding public service to health services in Queensland.	
QLD	Captain John Richard Watkinson	For outstanding public service to the maritime industry and maritime safety.	
WA	Gregory Stuart Martin	For outstanding public service in Western Australia, particularly in the areas of planning and road infrastructure.	
WA	Deirdre Anne O'Donnell	For outstanding public service as the State Ombudsman for Western Australia.	
SA	Dr David Roy Filby	For outstanding public service to the Australian health care system.	
SA	Joslene Mazel	For outstanding public service to Indigenous communities in South Australia.	
SA	David Waterford	For outstanding public service, particularly towards social issues affecting the community of South Australia.	
ACT	Nancye Margaret Burkevics	For outstanding public service within the ACT Department of Education and Training.	
ACT	Andrew Forster	For outstanding public service in the provision of floral displays throughout Canberra, particularly the annual Floriade.	
ACT	Graeme Allan Matthew	For outstanding public service to teaching and student welfare, particularly at the Alfred Deakin High School.	
NT	Robert Aubrey Bradshaw	For outstanding public service to the development of public sector administration in the Northern Territory.	
NT	Leonie Stokes	For outstanding public service to Human Resource management within the Northern Territory Police, Fire and Emergency Services.	

=== Australian Police Medal (APM) ===
State/ Territory	Recipient	Notes
Federal	Commander William Dalton Jamieson	
Federal	Federal Agent Vincent John Pannell	
Federal	Assistant Commissioner Michael Anthony Phelan	
NSW	Chief Superintendent Michael John Corboy	
NSW	Detective Superintendent Peter Norman Cotter	
NSW	Superintendent Peter Gallagher	
NSW	Superintendent Phillip John Hickman	
NSW	Detective Chief Superintendent David William Hudson	
NSW	Superintendent Geoffrey Allan McKechnie	
NSW	Superintendent Max Mitchell	
NSW	Superintendent Gregory Edwin Rolph	
NSW	Superintendent Stuart John Wilkins	
VIC	Leading Senior Constable Laurence Henry Carter	
VIC	Sergeant Gregory Arthur Chandler	
VIC	Senior Constable Deborah Anne Charteris	
VIC	Inspector Brian Edwin Hillier	
VIC	Senior Sergeant Frank John Scammell	
VIC	Acting Inspector William Weatherly	
QLD	Senior Sergeant Gregory Ian Bishop	
QLD	Superintendent Katarina Ruzh Carroll	
QLD	Chief Superintendent Peter John Martin	
QLD	Superintendent Peter John Savage	
QLD	Senior Sergeant Nicholas Patrick Shanahan	
WA	Peter Bannister	
WA	Assistant Commissioner Barbara Anne Etter	
WA	Superintendent Ferdinand Gere	
SA	Assistant Commissioner Bryan Alexander Fahy	
SA	Senior Sergeant Mark Neil Weaver	
TAS	First Class Constable Edward Scott Dunn	
TAS	Inspector Stephen John Hortle	
NT	Senior Constable Richard George Cheal	
NT	Senior Constable Daniela Linda Mattiuzzo	

=== Australian Fire Service Medal (AFSM) ===
Australian Fire Service Medal ribbon

State/ Territory	Recipient	Notes
NSW	Neville Graham Anderson	
NSW	John Mark Bedford	
NSW	Clinton Everett Jessop-Smith	
NSW	Clive Maxwell Linnett OAM	
NSW	Brian Lindsay McKinlay	
NSW	Thomas Jeffrey Milburn	
NSW	Peter Murphy	
NSW	Graham William Parks	
NSW	Stephen Leonard Weyman	
VIC	Ronald Tuckett Hooper	
VIC	John David Jugum	
VIC	William Thomas "Bill" Pressey	
VIC	Michael James Sanderson	
VIC	William Andrew Speirs	
VIC	David Turner	
VIC	Franciscus Christianus van Bakel	
QLD	Edward Gladstone Kirk OAM	
QLD	Andrew John Short	
WA	Kevin John Bullen	
WA	Paul Walter Maddern	
WA	John Patrick Truswell	
SA	Kevin Paul Boyle	
SA	Haydon William Castle	
SA	Christopher John Martin	
SA	Raoul Henri Otto de Grancy	
SA	Neville Robert Schultz	
TAS	Gerald Thomas Crawdord	
TAS	Antony Gee	
TAS	Michael Frederick Munnings	
ACT	Russell John Shephard	
NT	Maxine Anne Way	

=== Ambulance Service Medal (ASM) ===
Ambulance Service Medal ribbon

State/ Territory	Recipient	Notes
NSW	Brian Allan Deen	
NSW	Anthony Leo "Tony" Gately	
NSW	Graham John McCarthy	
NSW	Kenneth John Pritchard	
NSW	Malcolm John Voyzey	
NSW	Dennis George Willis	
VIC	Georgina Anne Hall	
VIC	Ian "Bruce" Hyatt	
VIC	Ronda Joy Manhire	
VIC	Ian Clive Nagle	
QLD	Colin James Nash	
WA	Peter Wesley King	
WA	Darren Clifford Mudge	
WA	Graeme John Shearing	
SA	Dr Hugh Jonathan Grantham	
SA	Jonathan Jaensch	

=== Emergency Services Medal (ESM) ===
Emergency Services Medal ribbon

State/ Territory	Recipient	Notes
NSW	John Aldridge	
NSW	Warwick George Cary	
NSW	Brigadier Philip John McNamara CSC (Retired)	
NSW	Lindsay William Matterson	
NSW	Peter John Phillipson	
NSW	Max Walters AM, MBE	
NSW	William George Webster	
VIC	Timothy Warner	
QLD	Barry Lex Simple	
WA	Paul John Dwyer	
WA	Eliot Russell Fisher	
SA	Graeme Desmond Wynwood	
TAS	Craig William Blizzard	
TAS	Roger Charles Brown	
TAS	Antonio Luigi "Tony" Chirichiello	
ACT	Peter Gerald McEnroe	

== Gallantry, Distinguished and Conspicuous Service ==
=== Medal for Gallantry (MG) ===
Medal for Gallantry ribbon

Branch	Recipient	Citation	Notes
Army	Major Daniel Sebastian Cash	For acts of gallantry in action in hazardous circumstances during operations against Taliban and Anti Coalition Militia while deployed on Operation SLIPPER in Afghanistan, from June to October 2006.	
Army	Corporal Jeremy Thomas Holder	For an act of gallantry in action in hazardous circumstances as a Medical Assistant within the Special Operations Task Group – Task Force 637, while deployed on Operation SLIPPER Rotation 3 Afghanistan, from May to September 2006.	

=== Distinguished Service Cross (DSC) ===
Distinguished Service Cross ribbon

Branch	Recipient	Citation	Notes
Army	Brigadier Michael Peter Crane AM	For distinguished service in command and leadership in the Middle East Area of Operations as the Commander Joint Task Force 633 for Operations CATALYST and SLIPPER.	
Army	Lieutenant Colonel Michael Mahy	For distinguished command and leadership in action as Commanding Officer of Al Muthanna Task Group Three and Operational Overwatch Battle Group West.	
Army	Lieutenant Colonel Anthony John Rawlins	For distinguished command and leadership of Overwatch Battle Group West – Two in Al Muthanna and Dhi Qar Provinces, Iraq, during Operation CATALYST.	
Army	Colonel Mark Andrew Smethurst AM	For distinguished command and leadership as Commander of the Special Operations Task Group during Operation SLIPPER Rotation 3.	

=== Distinguished Service Medal (DSM) ===
Distinguished Service Medal ribbon

Branch	Recipient	Citation	Notes
Army	Corporal Benjamin James Daly	For distinguished leadership in action as an infantry section commander during Operation CATALYST in Iraq.	
Army	Corporal Bradley Ronald Watts	For distinguished leadership in action as a Medical Assistant with the Special Operations Task Group – Task Force 637, while deployed on Operation SLIPPER Rotation 3 Afghanistan, from May to September 2006.	
Army	Corporal Wesley Dean Wood	For distinguished leadership in action as an infantry section commander during Operation CATALYST in Iraq.	

=== Commendation for Distinguished Service ===
Commendation for Distinguished Service ribbon

Branch	Recipient	Citation	Notes
Navy	Lieutenant Paul David Pelczar RAN	For distinguished performance of duties as the Deputy Intelligence Officer on the staff of Commander Task Force 158 during Coalition operations in the Northern Persian Gulf in direct support of Operation CATALYST.	
Navy	Captain Gregory John Sammut CSC, RAN	For distinguished performance of duties as Commander Task Group 158.1 during Coalition operations in the Northern Persian Gulf in direct support of Operation CATALYST.	
Navy	Captain Peter Michael Scott CSC, RAN	For distinguished performance of duties as the Chief of Staff Headquarters Joint Task Force 633 during Operations CATALYST and SLIPPER.	
Navy	Leading Seaman Anthony Ethol Wessling	For distinguished performance of duties as an Assistant Battle Watch Captain and communications watchkeeper on the staff of Commander Task Force 158 during Coalition operations in the Northern Persian Gulf in direct support of Operation CATALYST.	
Army	Colonel Ashley Warren Gunder	For distinguished performance of duties as the Australian National Representative in Iraq and Principal Staff Officer within the United Kingdom's Multi National Division South East.	
Army	Captain Nicholas Peter Rose	For distinguished performance of duties as the Intelligence Officer of the Special Operations Task Group – Task Force 637, while deployed on Operation SLIPPER Rotation 3 Afghanistan, from May to September 2006.	
Army	Colonel Richard Hugh Stanhope AM	For distinguished performance of duties as the inaugural Deputy Commander of Joint Task Force 633 on Operation SLIPPER in Afghanistan in 2006.	

=== Conspicuous Service Cross (CSC) ===
Conspicuous Service Cross ribbon

Branch	Recipient	Citation	Notes
Navy	Captain Stuart Campbell Mayer RAN	For outstanding achievement as Chief Staff Officer (Operations) at Maritime Headquarters.	
Navy	Commander Bruce James Shearman RAN	For outstanding achievement as the Manager Logistics Data and Allowances.	
Navy	Lieutenant Ben Martin Weller RAN	For outstanding achievement as a Boarding Party Officer aboard HMAS SUCCESS in support of Operations RELEX II and RESOLUTE.	
Army	Colonel Brett Lawrence Billett	For outstanding achievement as the inaugural Director of Occupational Health and Safety - Army.	
Army	Major Kevin John Cuthbertson	For outstanding achievement in the field of explosive ordnance safety.	
Army	Lieutenant Colonel Dean Gregory Franklin	For outstanding achievement as Commanding Officer of the School of Infantry and Senior Army Representative – Singleton.	
Army	Major David Charles Hafner	For outstanding achievement as the Officer Commanding B Squadron, 5th Aviation Regiment and Combat Team Vigilance.	
Army	Major George Witold Kosciuszko	For outstanding achievement as the Operations Officer of the Defence National Storage and Distribution Centre, particularly in the provision of logistic support to operations.	
Army	Major Wayne Leslie Reed	For outstanding achievement as Acting Officer Commanding, Joint Movements Control Office Townsville and Officer Commanding, Joint Movements Control Office Darwin.	
Army	Major David Michael Sienkiewicz	For outstanding achievement as the Executive Officer of the 6th Engineer Support Regiment and as the Operations Officer on Operation SUMATRA ASSIST.	
Army	Warrant Officer Kevin James Woods OAM	For outstanding achievement as Regimental Sergeant Major – Army.	
Air Force	Wing Commander Jason Werner Agius	For outstanding achievement as the Officer-in-Charge of Aircraft Structural Integrity within the Directorate General Technical Air Worthiness.	
Air Force	Sergeant Gladstone Gerard Brohier	For outstanding achievement as Maintenance Sergeant at Number 36 Squadron.	
Air Force	Wing Commander Ian "Grant" Murphy	For outstanding achievement as Base Commander at Royal Australian Air Force Base East Sale.	
Air Force	Wing Commander Kenneth John Robinson	For outstanding achievement as Director Personnel Reserves - Air Force.	

=== Conspicuous Service Medal (CSM) ===
Conspicuous Service Medal ribbon

Branch	Recipient	Citation	Notes
Navy	Commander Stephen Peter Cole RAN	For devotion to duty as the Royal Australian Navy Environmental Manager.	
Navy	Lieutenant Commander Jayne Vanessa Craig RAN	For devotion to duty as Deputy Director Navy Employment Conditions and Navy Pay Case Manager in support of Navy personnel.	
Navy	Leading Seaman Anthony Cryer	For devotion to duty as Executive Assistant to the Chief of Navy.	
Navy	Warrant Officer Simon John Kelly	For devotion to duty as Officer-in-Charge of the Transient Personnel Management Cell and Establishment Warrant Officer of HMAS PENGUIN.	
Navy	Petty Officer Shane Anthony Nesbitt	For meritorious achievement as Second-in-Command of a Boarding Party aboard HMAS SUCCESS in support of Operations RELEX II and RESOLUTE.	
Navy	Lieutenant Commander Philip Francis Ridgway RAN	For meritorious achievement as Second-in-Command of a Boarding Party aboard HMAS SUCCESS in support of Operations RELEX II and RESOLUTE.	
Navy	Lieutenant Peter Mathew Russell RAN	For devotion to duty as the Navigation Officer aboard HMAS ARUNTA.	
Navy	Commander Neville Andrew Teague RAN	For devotion to duty as the Director Military Administration – Navy within Headquarters, Navy Systems Command.	
Army	Warrant Officer Class Two Jeremy Paul Archer	For devotion to duty as the Director Military Administration – Navy within Headquarters, Navy Systems Command.	
Army	Warrant Officer Class Two Clayton Charles Baker	For devotion to duty as the Warrant Officer Physical Training Instructor at the School of Infantry.	
Army	Major Scott Robert Brockhurst	For devotion to duty as the Staff Officer Grade Two Aviation Capability at Headquarters 16th Brigade (Aviation).	
Army	Warrant Officer Class One Laurence James Case	For meritorious achievement to the Australian Army Band Corps.	
Army	Warrant Officer Class Two Shane Green	For meritorious achievement as the Unit Recruiting Liaison Officer and Squadron Sergeant Major in the 12th/16th Hunter River Lancers.	
Army	Warrant Officer Class Two Andrew James Hamilton	For devotion to duty as the Special Air Service Regiment Selection Warrant Officer at the Special Forces Training Centre.	
Army	Lieutenant Colonel Scott Philip Harris	For meritorious achievement in the acquisition of helicopter systems for the Australian Army.	
Army	Warrant Officer Class One Graeme Rodney Jones	For devotion to duty as Regimental Quartermaster Sergeant at the Incident Response Regiment.	
Army	Warrant Officer Class One Kathleen Leah McIntyre	For meritorious achievement as Squadron Quartermaster Sergeant of the 15th Transport Squadron.	
Army	Warrant Officer Class Two Richard Thomas Tassell	For meritorious achievement as Wharf Master at the 10th Force Support Battalion.	
Army	Warrant Officer Class Two Amir Markus Tito	For meritorious achievement as the Artificer Sergeant Major of the 2nd Battalion, The Royal Australian Regiment.	
Army	Lieutenant Colonel Robert Jason Worswick	For devotion to duty as Staff Officer Grade One Concepts at Headquarters Training Command - Army	
Air Force	Warrant Officer Lynton David Baker	For devotion to duty as Squadron Administrative Warrant Officer at Number 92 Wing.	
Air Force	Squadron Leader Justin Allan Cockroft	For devotion to duty as Commanding Officer at Defence Explosive Ordnance Training School.	
Air Force	Corporal Shandelle Ann Crosby	For devotion to duty as the Dental Supervisor at Number 1 Air Transportable Health Squadron.	
Air Force	Flight Sergeant Shane Alexander Dew	For devotion to duty as Base Armament Manager at Combat Support Unit, Royal Australian Air Force Base Edinburgh.	
Air Force	Warrant Officer Sean Tavis Judge	For devotion to duty as the Staremaster Chief Analyst at Number 1 Radar Surveillance Unit.	
