= Katarina Carroll =

Australian police officer

Katarina Carroll AO APM
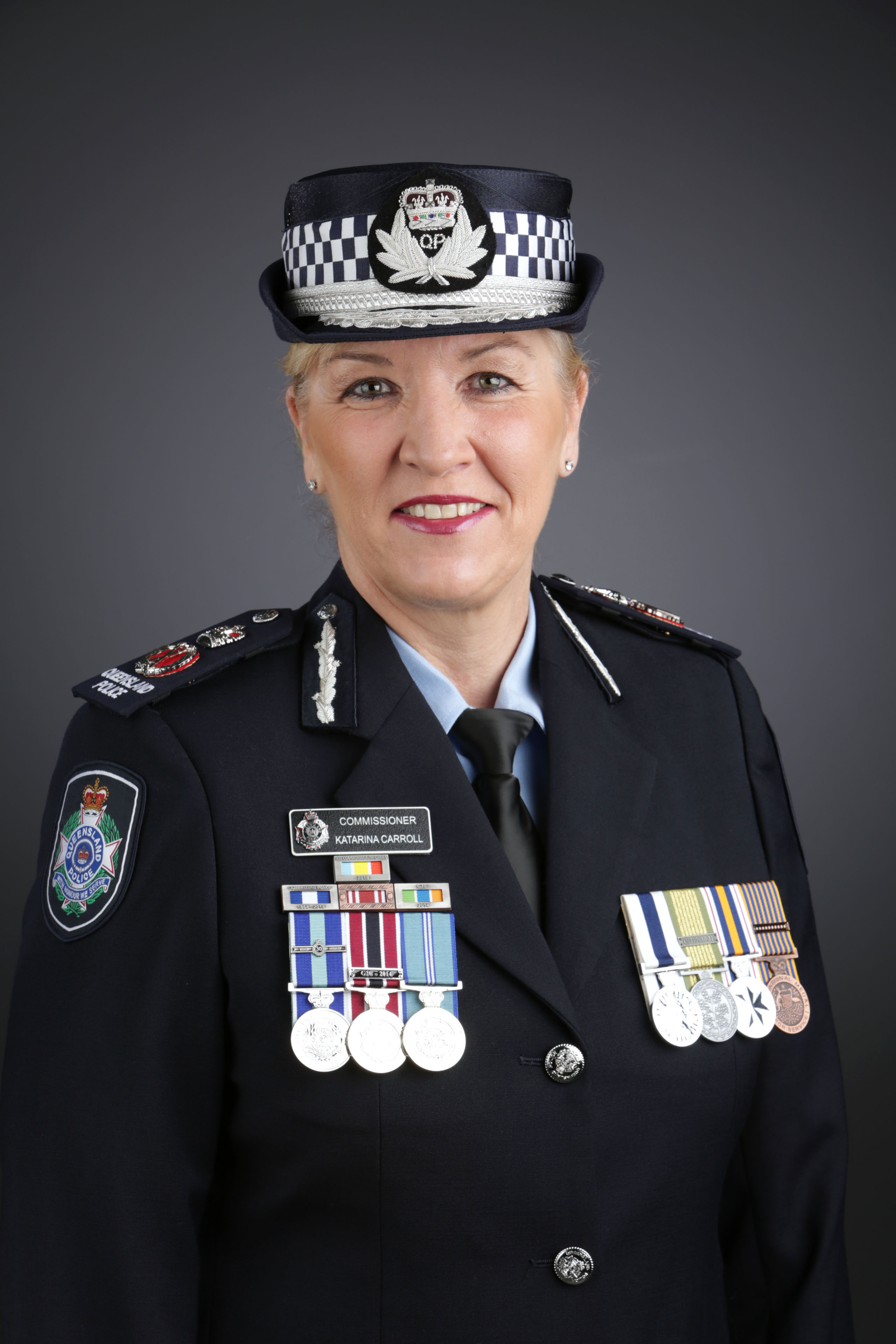

Commissioner of the Queensland Police Service
- In office 8 July 2019 – 1 March 2024
- Preceded by: Ian Stewart
- Succeeded by: Steve Gollschewski

Commissioner of Queensland Fire and Emergency Services
- In office 1 August 2015 – 5 June 2019
- Preceded by: Lee Johnson
- Succeeded by: Greg Leach

Personal details
- Born: Katarina Ruzh Bošnjak; 17 November 1963 (age 63) Innisfail, Queensland, Australia
- Education: Griffith University
- Occupation: Police officer

Katarina Ruzh Carroll (nee Bošnjak) AO APM (born 17 November 1963) is a retired Australian police officer and was the Commissioner of the Queensland Police Service (QPS) from July 2019 to March 2024. She is the first female commissioner of QPS. She was formerly the Commissioner of the Queensland Fire and Emergency Services from August 2015 until July 2019. On 20 February 2024, Carroll announced she would not seek an extension to her contract and would step down as of Friday 1 March 2024.

== Early life and education ==
Carroll was born on 17 November 1963 in Innisfail, Queensland, to Bosnian Croat parents, Ivan and Antonia Bošnjak from Ljubuški and Trebižat, Bosnia and Herzegovina, and raised on a tobacco farm in Innot Hot Springs. She was educated at Mount Garnet State School, and then boarded at Mount St Bernard College, Herberton before completing an associate diploma in community welfare at James Cook University in Townsville. She also holds a Bachelor of Arts in criminology and criminal justice from Griffith University, which awarded her its Outstanding Alumnus Award in 2018.

== Career ==
Carroll joined the Queensland Police Service in 1983, working in general duties, then as a detective in the drug squad, crime operations and ethical standards. She was awarded the Australian Police Medal in the 2008 Australia Day Honours. In 2014, Carroll served as Operations Commander for the G20 summit in Brisbane.

Carroll joined the new Queensland Fire and Emergency Services in December 2014 as acting commissioner, and was officially appointed to the role on 1 August 2015.

On 23 April 2019, Queensland Premier Annastacia Palaszczuk announced that Carroll would succeed Ian Stewart as Commissioner of Queensland Police upon Stewart's retirement in July 2019. Carroll was appointed Commissioner of the Queensland Police Service on 8 July.

In October 2019 Carroll was named one of The Australian Financial Review's 100 Women of Influence in the Public Policy category.

On 12 February 2024, Carroll was invited to address the Queensland Cabinet where she sought for more police powers to tackle rising crime. On 20 February 2024, Carroll announced her resignation from her position on 1 March 2024, rather than seeking an extension in the position. This followed the state's commission of inquiry into police culture and domestic violence responses, where it was "found 'that a failure of leadership' allowed this toxic culture to fester".

On 22 July 2024, Carroll was announced on a three-year appointment as the new chair to the board of the Queensland Reconstruction Authority, the state agency for disaster recovery. (This was discontinued by the new government in September 2025.) Additionally she was appointed by August 2024 to assist the Northern Territory Police Force to oversea industrial relations negotiations. In January 2025 she took up directorship with LifeFlight Australia.

She was appointed an Officer of the Order of Australia as part of the 2026 King's Birthday Honours for 'distinguished service to law enforcement, to disaster management response and recovery, and to the community.'

== Honours and awards ==
Carroll wears the following Australian and Queensland awards and unit citations on the uniform:

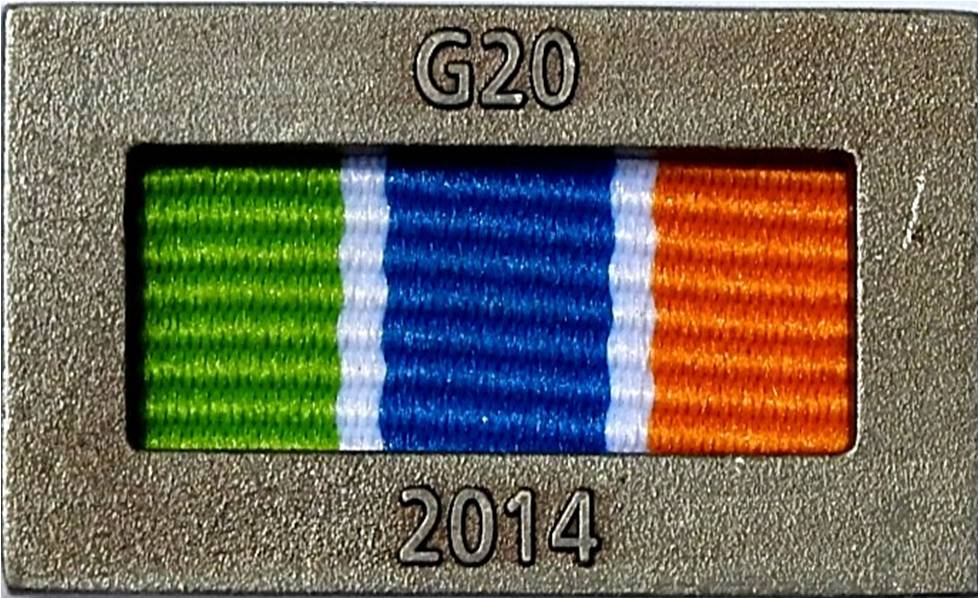

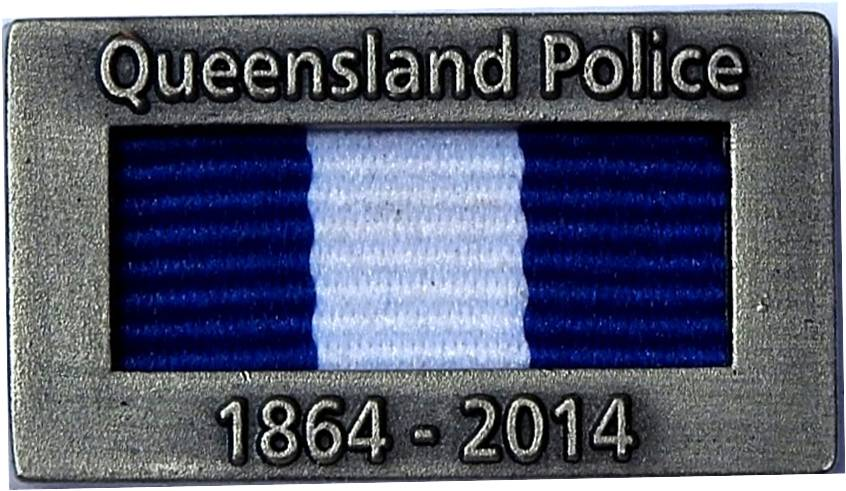
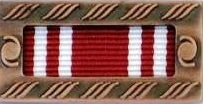
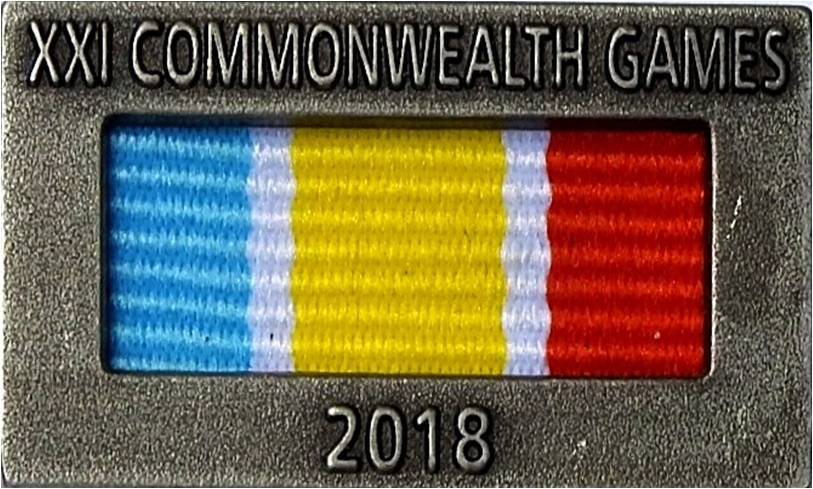

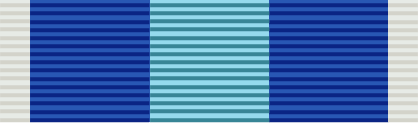
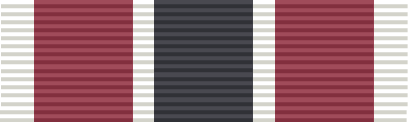
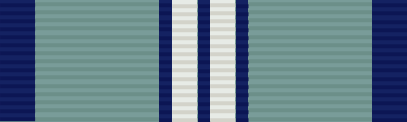

Honours and awards
Officer of the Order of Australia (AO)
Australian Police Medal (APM)
National Emergency Medal with three clasps
National Police Service Medal
National Medal with two clasps
Queensland Police Meritorious Service Medal
Queensland Police Exemplary Conduct Medal (with category clasp)
Queensland Police Service Medal (with relevant years of service clasp)
G20 Citation
Commonwealth Games Citation
2010–2011 Queensland Flood and Cyclone Citation
QPS 150 Years Citation

== See also ==
- Women in law enforcement

Fire appointments
Preceded by Lee Johnson	Commissioner of the Queensland Fire and Emergency Services; 2015–2019	Succeeded by Greg Leach
Police appointments
Preceded by Ian Stewart	Commissioner of the Queensland Police Service; 2019–2024	Succeeded by Steve Gollschewski
