= Ross Homel =

Australian criminologist

Ross Homel AO
- Born: 1950 or 1951 (age 75–76); Sydney, New South Wales, Australia
- Education: University of Sydney (MS by Research, 1971)
- Occupation: criminologist
- Known for: extensive research into causes of crime and preventative measures

Ross James Homel AO (born 1950 or 1951) is an Australian criminologist.

== Career ==
He is best known for his extensive research where he theoretically analyses crime and applies scientific methods to develop and implement prevention and intervention strategies.

Notably, his research is credited with the introduction of random breath testing for motorists in Australia.

In 1992, Homel was appointed as the foundation professor of Criminology and Criminal Justice at Griffith University. He had previously been a senior lecturer at the School of Behavioural Sciences at Macquarie University.

From 1992 to 1995, Homel was the editor of Australian and New Zealand Journal of Criminology and from February 1994 to April 1999, he was a part-time commissioner with the Queensland Criminal Justice Commission which was established after the Fitzgerald Inquiry. After Queensland politician Gordon Nuttall was found guilty of corruption, Homel called for another inquiry to investigate potential corruption.

Homel has authored more than 200 books, articles and government reports.

He frequently provides commentary in the media on crime-related matters, particularly on the issue of youth crime.

== Awards ==
Homel's "Pathways to Prevention" initiative which he developed in partnership with Mission Australia won the 2004 National Crime and Violence Prevention Award.

In the 2008 Australia Day Honours, Homel was made an Officer of the Order of Australia in recognition for his service to education especially in the field of criminology.

In 2008, Homel was named as a Queensland Great.

In 2015, Brisbane newspaper The Courier-Mail listed Homel as one of Queensland's Top 50 "thinkers".
