= Ian Stewart (police commissioner) =

Commissioner Ian Stewart AO APM
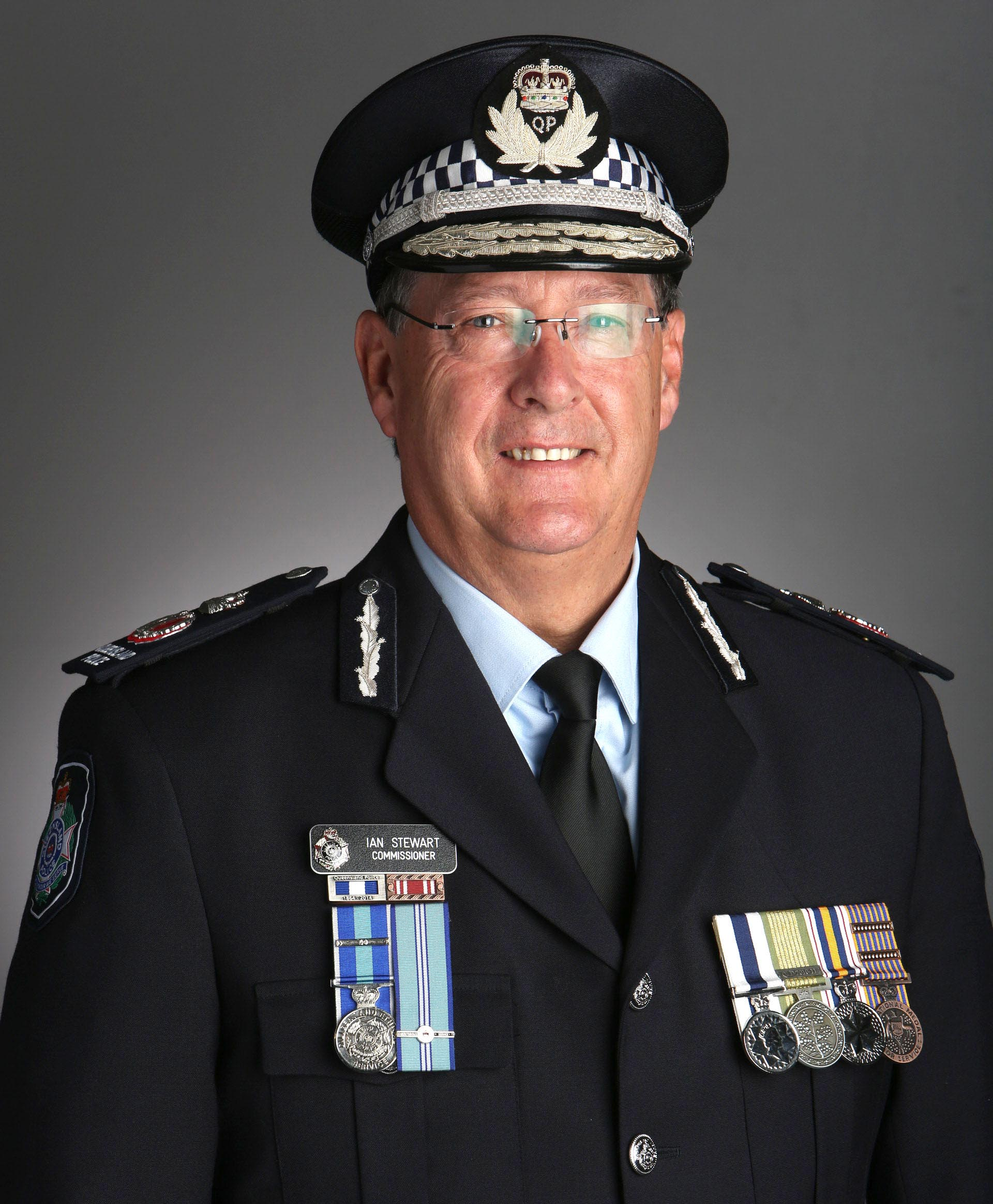

Commissioner of the Queensland Police Service
- In office 1 November 2012 – 7 July 2019
- Preceded by: Bob Atkinson
- Succeeded by: Katarina Carroll

State Recovery Coordinator
- Incumbent
- Assumed office 18 September 2019
- Preceded by: Major General Stuart Smith

Personal details
- Education: University of Southern Queensland
- Profession: Police officer

Ian Duncan Hunter Stewart AO APM is a retired police officer who served as the Commissioner of the Queensland Police Service from 2012 until 2019. In 2019 Stewart was appointed the Queensland State Recovery Coordinator.

== Career ==
Stewart was inducted as a constable to the Queensland Police Force with registered number 8661 on 14 December 1973, after growing up in Toowoomba. Six of his first seven years was spent policing in Townsville. He completed a Master of Public Policy and Administration and a Bachelor of Business qualifications.

From Deputy Commissioner (Regional Operations) he was announced as Commissioner of the Queensland Police Service on 3 September 2012, commencing 1 November 2012.

On 1 January 2013 Stewart announced the commencement of the Queensland Police Service Renewal Program, which included organisational restructure. The review proposed a new vision for the Service with key objectives being to stop crime, make the community safer and build relationships across the community, aimed at delivering improved frontline policing and community services.

His contract was extended for three more years, from 1 November 2017. Stewart however prior to contract expiry announced his retirement on 25 February 2019 to take effect in July 2019.

On 18 October 2019 Stewart was named the new State Recovery Coordinator by Premier Annastacia Palaszczuk.

== Honours and awards ==

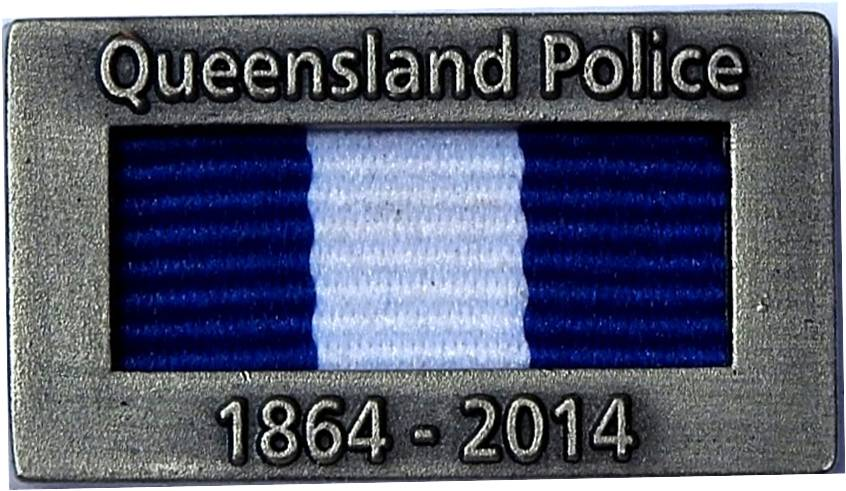
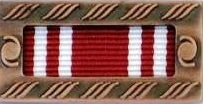

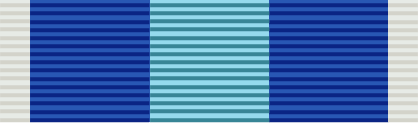
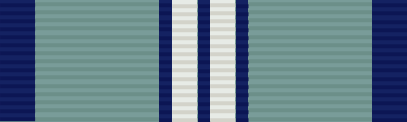

Honours and awards	Date awarded	Citation
Officer of the Order of Australia (AO)	26 January 2020	distinguished service to law enforcement as Commissioner of Police in Queensland, and to the community.
Australian Police Medal (APM)	26 January 2005	
National Emergency Medal		
National Police Service Medal		
National Medal		
Queen Elizabeth II Diamond Jubilee Medal	1 July 2020	Papua New Guinean ribbon of the medal.
Commissioner's Award for Meritorious Service		
Queensland Police Service Medal (with relevant years of service clasp)		
2010-2011 Queensland Flood and Cyclone Citation		
QPS 150 Years Citation		

Police appointments
Preceded by Bob Atkinson	Commissioner of the Queensland Police Service; 2012–2019	Succeeded by Katarina Carroll
