= Steve Gollschewski =

Australian police officer (1959–2026)

Steve Gollschewski AO, APM
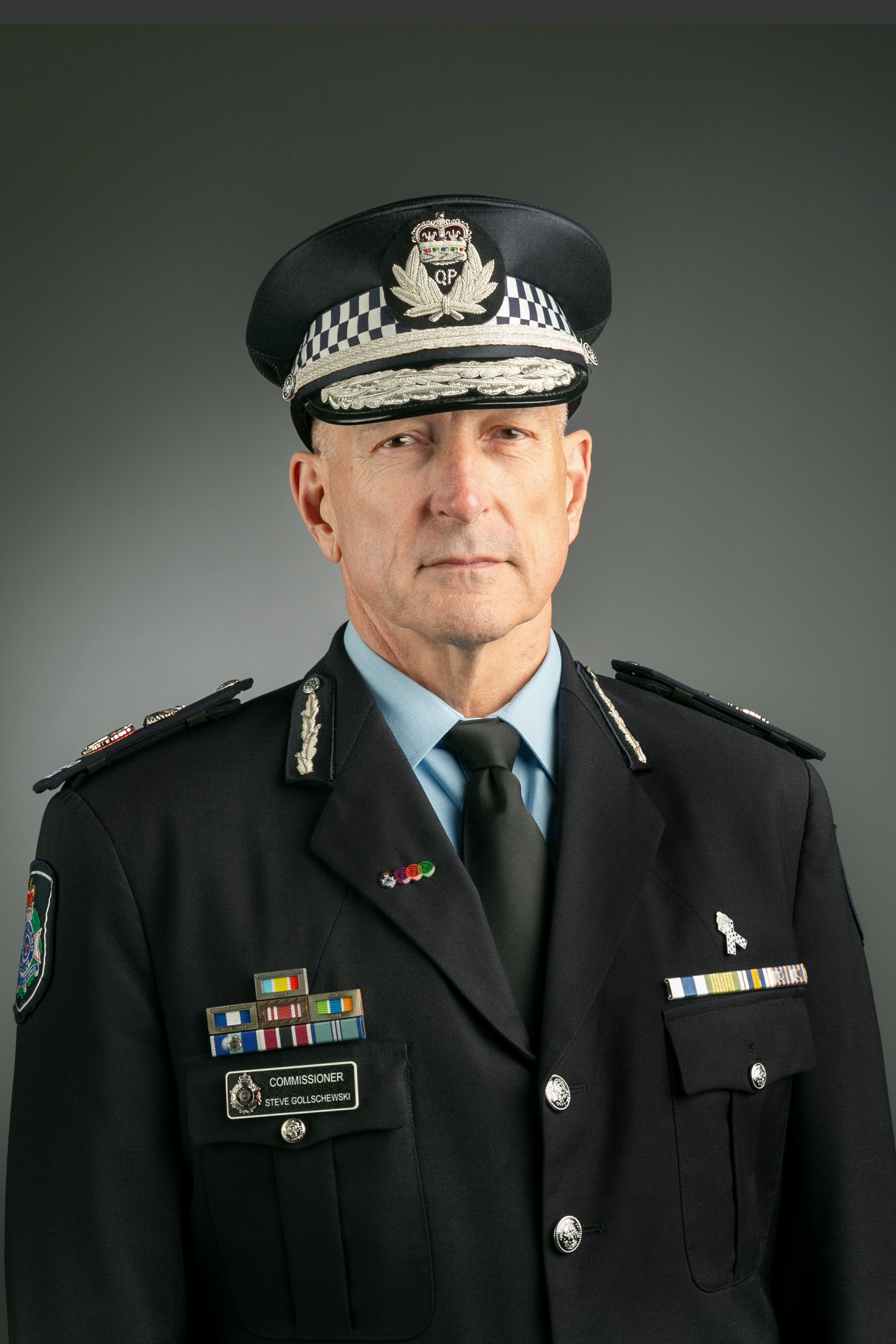

Commissioner of the Queensland Police Service
- In office 22 April 2024 – 20 February 2026
- Preceded by: Katarina Carroll
- Succeeded by: Brett Pointing

Personal details
- Born: Stephan William Gollschewski; 8 June 1959 Brisbane, Queensland, Australia
- Died: 4 September 2026 (aged 67) Brisbane, Queensland, Australia
- Occupation: Police officer

Stephan William Gollschewski (8 June 1959 – 4 September 2026) was an Australian long-serving police officer who served as Queensland Police Commissioner.

== Life and career ==
Gollschewski joined the Queensland Police Force in 1980.

He was appointed an Officer of the Order of Australia in the 2026 King's Birthday Honours in recognition of his long service and counter-terrorism activities.

Gollschewski retired in February 2026. He died from lung cancer in Brisbane, on 4 September 2026, at the age of 67.

Police appointments
Preceded by Katarina Carroll	Commissioner of the Queensland Police Service; 2024–2026	Succeeded by Brett Pointing
