= Australian Dictionary of Biography =

- First edition of volume 1
- Language: English
- Subject: Biographies of notable Australians
- Genre: Encyclopedia
- Published: Carlton, Victoria
- Publisher: Melbourne University Press
- Publication date: 1966–2021
- Publication place: Australia
- Media type: Print (1966–2021); Online (2006–present)
- ISBN: 978-0-522-84459-7
- OCLC: 70677943
- Website: adb.anu.edu.au

The Australian Dictionary of Biography (ADB or AuDB) is a national co-operative enterprise founded and maintained by the Australian National University (ANU) to produce authoritative biographical articles on eminent people in Australia's history. Initially published by Melbourne University Press in a series of twelve hard-copy volumes between 1966 and 2005, the dictionary has been published online since 2006 by the National Centre of Biography (NCB) at ANU, which has also published Obituaries Australia (OA) since 2010.

== History ==
The ADB project began operating in 1957, although preparation work had been started in about 1954 at the Australian National University. An index was created that would be the basis of the ADB. Pat Wardle was involved in the work and, in time, she herself was included in the ADB. Staff are located at the National Centre of Biography in the History Department of the Research School of Social Sciences at the Australian National University. Since its inception, 4,000 authors have contributed to the ADB and its published volumes contain 9,800 scholarly articles on 12,000 individuals. Only 210 of them are Indigenous, an imbalance which can be equated with what the anthropologist Bill Stanner has called the white “cult of forgetfulness" about Indigenous achievements.

== General editors ==
Since the project began there have been six general editors as of 2021, namely:

- Douglas Pike (1962–1974)
- Bede Nairn (1974–1984)
- Geoff Serle (1975–1987)
- John Ritchie (1988–2002)
- Diane Langmore (2001–2008)
- Melanie Nolan (2008–present)

== ADB Medal ==
First awarded in 2002, the ADB Medal recognises outstanding contribution to the work of the ADB. As of April 2026, 27 people have received the medal.

== Publications ==
=== Hardcopy volumes ===
To date, the ADB has produced 19 hardcopy volumes of biographical articles on important and representative figures in Australian history, published by Melbourne University Press. In addition to publishing these works, the ADB makes its primary research material available to the academic community and the public.

Volume(s)	Years published	Subjects covered
1 and 2	1966–67	Covered those Australians who lived in the period 1788–1850
3 to 6	1969–76	Covered those Australians who lived in the period 1851–1890
7 to 12	1979–90	Covered those Australians who lived in the period 1891–1939
13 to 16	1993–2002	Covered those Australians who lived in the period 1940–1980
17 and 18	2007–2012	Covered those Australians who died between 1981 and 1990
19	2021	Covered those Australians who died between 1991 and 1995
Supplement	2005	Dealt with those Australians not covered by the original volumes
Index	1991	Index for Volumes 1 to 12

=== Biographical Register ===
Two supplementary volumes were published as a by-product of the first 12 volumes of the ADB. These are A Biographical Register, 1788–1939: Notes from the Name Index of the Australian Dictionary of Biography (1987) in two volumes. These contain biographical notes on another 8,100 individuals not included in the ADB. Each entry contains brief notes on the individual concerned, gives sources, lists cross-references between entries and the ADB and there is an occupation index at the end of volume II.

=== Online publication ===
On 6 July 2006, the Australian Dictionary of Biography Online was launched by Michael Jeffery, Governor-General of Australia, and received a Manning Clark National Cultural Award in December 2006. The website is a joint production of the ADB and the Australian Science and Technology Heritage Centre, University of Melbourne (Austehc).

=== Citation ===
- various authors (1966). Australian Dictionary of Biography. Melbourne University Publishing. ISBN 0-522-84236-4. ISSN 1833-7538. LCCN 66013723. OCLC 70677943. OL 5984223M. Wikidata Q672680.

== Obituaries Australia ==
Obituaries Australia (OA), a digital repository of digital obituaries about significant Australians, went live in August 2010, after operating as an in-house database for some time, using Canberra Times journalist and deputy editor John Farquharson's obituaries for its pilot. The National Centre of Biography encouraged the public to send in scanned copies of obituaries and other biographical material.

The fully searchable database also links the obituaries to important digitised records such as war service records, ASIO files and oral history interviews, in libraries, archives and museums. and will link to a search on the name in Trove, the National Library of Australia's database of newspapers, library catalogue holdings, government gazettes and other material.

The database comprises obituaries about "anyone who has made a contribution to Australian life"; some have not even visited Australia but had political or business connections and interests. There are links between ADB and AO on each entry where articles exist on both databases.

== Criticism ==
In 2018, Clinton Fernandes wrote that ADB is conspicuously silent on the slaveholder or slave profiting pasts of a number of influential figures in the development of Australia, including George Fife Angas, Isaac Currie, Archibald Paull Burt, Charles Edward Bright, Alexander Kenneth Mackenzie, Robert Allwood, Lachlan Macquarie, Donald Charles Cameron, John Buhot, John Belisario, Alfred Langhorne, John Samuel August, and Godfrey Downes Carter. The NCB subsequently launched its Legacies of Slavery project, which aims to expand coverage of people who had links to British slavery.
