= Bob Atkinson (police officer) =

Australian police commissioner

Commissioner Bob Atkinson AO, APM
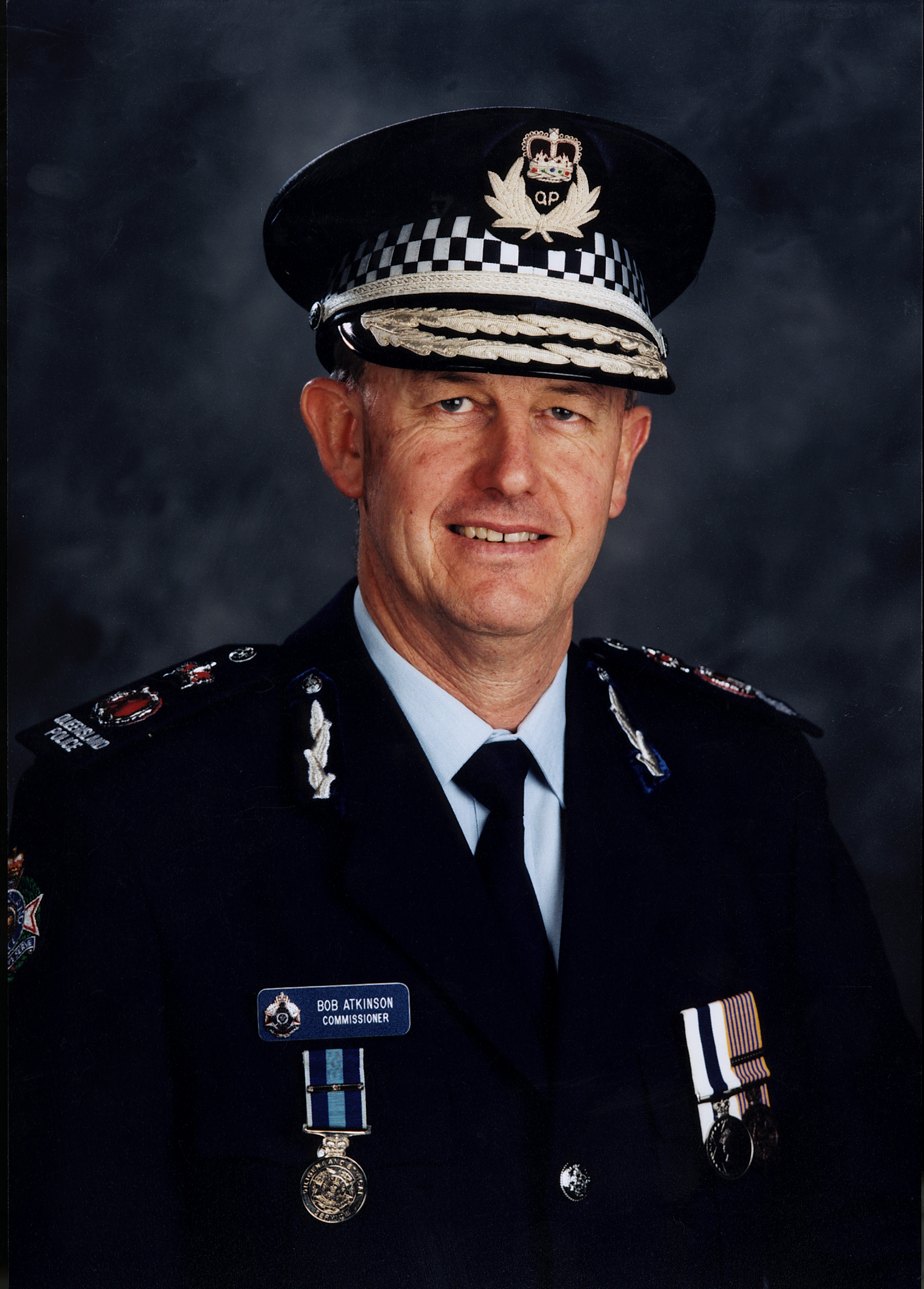

Commissioner of the Queensland Police Service
- In office November 2000 – October 2012
- Preceded by: Jim O'Sullivan
- Succeeded by: Ian Stewart

Royal Commissioner for the Royal Commission into Institutional Responses to Child Sexual Abuse
- In office 13 January 2013 – 15 December 2017 Serving with Peter McClellan, Jennifer Coate, Robert Fitzgerald, Helen Milroy, Andrew Murray
- Nominated by: Julia Gillard
- Appointed by: Quentin Bryce

Personal details
- Education: Charles Sturt University
- Profession: Police officer

Robert Atkinson, AO, APM is an Australian police officer who served as the Commissioner of the Queensland Police Service from 2000 until his retirement in 2012. In 2013, Atkinson was appointed as one of the six Royal Commissioners to the Australian Government Royal Commission into Institutional Responses to Child Sexual Abuse.

== Career ==
Atkinson was sworn in as constable on 30 October 1968 and there began a 44-year career with the Queensland Police Service, where he performed a wide range of operational and managerial roles. In his career with the Queensland Police Service, he served throughout Queensland from Goondiwindi to Cairns. He was a detective for approximately 20 years and acted as the police prosecutor in various Magistrates Courts during this period. Atkinson oversaw reforms after the Fitzgerald inquiry from 1990 and following the Public Sector Management Commission Review and Report Recommendations of the Queensland Police Service in 1993.

In 1989 Atkinson attended the three-month FBI National Academy Course at Quantico, Virginia, in the United States. He again attended the FBI Academy during 2002 for the National Executive Institute Program. Atkinson graduated from Charles Sturt University with a Graduate Certificate in Police Management; he has also completed the Police Executive Leadership Programme at the Australian Institute of Police Management in addition to studies undertaken at the FBI National Academy. He has been conferred with an honorary doctorate by Griffith University.

== Honours and awards ==

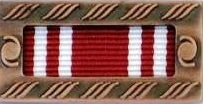

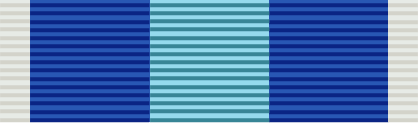

Honours and awards	Date awarded	Citation
Officer of the Order of Australia (AO)	26 January 2013	For distinguished service to policing and to the community of Queensland, through leadership in law enforcement, community and cultural engagement, improved service delivery and contributions to professional development.
Australian Police Medal (APM)	12 June 1995	
National Emergency Medal		
National Police Service Medal		with clasp Qld 2010–11
Centenary Medal	1 January 2001	For distinguished service to the public sector.
National Medal & 2 Bars	29 March 1985	National Medal
National Medal & 2 Bars	2 December 1994	National Medal – 1st Bar
National Medal & 2 Bars	2004	National Medal – 2nd Bar; totalling 35–44 years service
Queensland Police Service Medal (with relevant years of service clasp)		
2010-2011 Queensland Flood and Cyclone Citation		Queensland

Police appointments
Preceded by Jim O'Sullivan	Commissioner of the Queensland Police Service; 2000–2012	Succeeded by Ian Stewart
