= Diane Langmore =

Australian historian

Diane Langmore AM
- Born: 1941; Melbourne, Victoria, Australia
- Occupation: Historian; editor
- Education: University of Melbourne; University of Papua New Guinea
- Alma mater: Australian National University
- Notable awards: Australian Dictionary of Biography Medal

Diane Linley Langmore AM (born 1941) is an Australian historian best known for her work as general editor of the Australian Dictionary of Biography.

== Education and career ==
Langmore was born in Melbourne in 1941. She matriculated from Firbank Church of England Girls' School in 1958. She graduated from the University of Melbourne with a BA (1963) and DipEd (1964). She then completed a MA at the University of Papua New Guinea (1973), followed by a PhD at the Australian National University (1982).

She joined the staff of the Australian Dictionary of Biography (ADB) in 1982 as a research editor and was promoted to deputy general editor in 1997. When general editor John Ritchie had a stroke, Langmore took over as acting general editor but was not confirmed in the role until May 2004. Under her stewardship Volume 16 was completed and published in 2002, Volume 17 in 2007 and Volume 18 was a quarter complete prior to her retirement in May 2008. Langmore contributed 50 biographies to the ADB.

In the 2008 Australia Day Honours Langmore was made a Member of the Order of Australia for "service in recording the history of social sciences and humanities as General Editor of the Australian Dictionary of Biography". In 2009 she was awarded the Australian Dictionary of Biography Medal.

== Selected works ==
=== As author ===
- Langmore, Diane (1974), Tamate, a king: James Chalmers in New Guinea, 1877–1901, Melbourne University Press, ISBN 978-0-522-84079-7
- Langmore, Diane (1989), Missionary lives: Papua, 1874–1914, University of Hawaii Press, ISBN 978-0-585-27650-2
- Langmore, Diane; Dasenbrock, Reed Way (1992), Prime ministers' wives: The public and private lives of ten Australian women, McPhee Gribble, ISBN 978-0-86914-269-1
- Langmore, Diane (1997), Glittering surfaces: A life of Maie Casey, Allen & Unwin, ISBN 978-1-86448-302-4

=== As editor ===
- Ritchie, John; Langmore, Diane, eds. (1966), Australian dictionary of biography: 1940–1980, Pik–Z, vol. 16, Melbourne University Press (published 2002), ISBN 978-0-522-84997-4
- Langmore, Diane, ed. (1966), Australian dictionary of biography: 1940–1980, Pik–Z, vol. 17 (published 2007), ISBN 978-0-522-84997-4
