= Pat Wardle =

Australian local historian, writer and diarist

Patience Australie Wardle
- Born: Patience Australie Tillyard; 20 June 1910; Hornsby, New South Wales, Australia
- Died: 22 April 1992 (aged 81); Canberra, Australian Capital Territory
- Education: University of Sydney
- Known for: local historian

Patience Australie Wardle OAM known as Pat Wardle born Patience Australie Tillyard (20 June 1910 – 22 April 1992) was an Australian local historian, writer and diarist.

== Life ==
Wardle was the first of four sisters when she was born in 1910 in New South Wales in the Sydney suburb of Hornsby. Her mother Pattie (born Craske) was like her father, Robin John Tillyard, was born in the UK. When she was twelve she started a lifelong interest in keeping a diary. In 1929 she was in the small minority of Australian women who went to University. She studied at the University of Sydney. She lived at the Women's College where her interest in hockey made her a University Blue and her study of English, Latin and History gained her a degree. She had intended to study for a masters degree in Paris but finances directed her to teaching at the Cornish Liskeard County School.

She and her sister Hope drove ambulances in London early in the second world war and they both returned to Australia with children emigrated from the war. They were on board SS Rotorua. Another ship in their convoy was sunk by a U-boat. In 1942 she was in Australia where she became an officer in the Women's Auxiliary Australian Air Force (WAAAF) attending Administration training at the Queen's College in Melbourne. She rose to be a Flight Lieutenant and the commandant of 2,000 WAAAF women in Melbourne. She served until 1946. She returned to Canberra and lived with her mother.

She was working for the Bureau of Agricultural Economics when she went to work for the Australian National University where she help compile a register that was the basis for the Australian Dictionary of Biography that she would in time be recorded in.

The Canberra & District Historical Society was founded in 1953 and she was a founding member. She helped preserve Blundells Cottage. She devoted 38 years of her life to the society and she was rewarded with an OAM for her contributions.

Wardle died in Canberra on 22 April 1992 after a collision with a lorry when she ran a red traffic light. Her funeral service was packed and a prayer was said for the lorry driver.
