= Theo Maras =

Greek–Australian property developer (born 1948)

Theo Maras AM JP
- Θεοφάνης Μάρας
- Maras in 2026
- Born: Theo Steven Maras; 16 May 1948 (age 78); Arethousa, Ikaria, Greece
- Occupation: Property developer
- Known for: Redevelopment of East End, Adelaide
- Title: Founder and chair of Maras Group (from 2006); Chair of the Rundle Mall Management Authority (2010–2014); Chair of the Adelaide Central Market Authority (from 2020)
- Board member of: Renewal SA (2012–2013)
- Spouse: Helen (m. 1969)
- Children: 3; including Anthony

Theo Steven Maras (Note: Greek: Θεοφάνης Μάρας, romanized: Theofánis Máras [θeoˈfanis ˈmaras]) (born 16 May 1948) is a Greek–Australian property developer and philanthropist known for his role in the redevelopment of Adelaide's East End. He co-founded Mancorp in 1980 and established Maras Group in 2006.

Maras started to work as a bricklaying labourer part-time from the age of 14 years. Having gained experience through mobile home design and Chappell and Associates, he formed T Maras and Associates in North Adelaide in 1972. Maras and his wife, Helen, carried out renovations of residential properties prior to founding Mancorp together with Bill Manos. In the early 1990s, Mancorp secured the rights to redevelop the southern side of Rundle Street for shops, restaurants and other commercial premises. The Liberman Group separately secured the rights to redevelop the residential portion of the former Adelaide Fruit and Produce Exchange site. Maras left Mancorp in 2006 and became chairman of his new company, Maras Group.

Maras was the chairman of the Rundle Mall Management Authority between 2010 and 2014, which included the redevelopment of Rundle Mall during his chairmanship. Maras joined the board of Renewal SA in 2012 and served there until 2013. Maras became the chairman of the Adelaide Central Market Authority in 2020. He has been involved in the redevelopment of the adjacent Central Market Arcade along with the City of Adelaide.

Maras was the chairman of Common Ground Adelaide and helped finance their supported accommodation facility located in Franklin Street. He also assisted in raising funds for a chair position in child protection and founded the Foundation for Hellenic Studies. He was appointed a Member of the Order of Australia in the 2008 Australia Day Honours for his contribution to the state's building and construction industry and to the Greek community.

== Early life and education ==
Theo Steven Maras was born on 16 May 1948 in Arethousa, on the Greek island of Ikaria. With his family, he migrated to Australia in 1952 when he was just four years old. Maras's grandparents had migrated there in 1928. His family settled down in Walkerville, where he enrolled in Walkerville Primary School and acquired fluency in the English language with the assistance of the local community. Maras helped out in his family's market garden, and by the age of seven, he was helping his parents deliver their produce via horse and cart to the Adelaide Fruit and Produce Exchange, located in the East End.

After that, Maras went to school at Nailsworth and Gillies Plains High School. During his teenage years, he was a state champion for the 100 metres (330 ft) and 200 metres races and an Australian rules football player for Gaza and Broadview. After experiencing many repeated injuries and glandular fever, he quit playing at the age of 19. He got a diploma in architectural design and building technology.

== Career ==
=== Property development ===
Maras started working as a bricklayer's labourer part-time when he was 14 years old. He also worked for Millers Lime & Timber, designing mobile homes at Wowich Industries in Elizabeth, and became an employee of Chappell and Associates in the late 1960s. Maras established T Maras and Associates on Ward Street in North Adelaide in 1972. The initial property projects that he undertook together with his wife include renovations and sales of houses in Croydon and Netherby, as well as units in West Beach.

The East Terrace façade of the former Adelaide Fruit and Produce Exchange, 2026

In 1980, Maras and lawyer Bill Manos created a company named Mancorp that dealt with property investments and development. Through the 1980s, the company purchased and restored various heritage-listed buildings and kept them as rentable buildings. At the beginning of the 1990s, Mancorp acquired the right to develop the southern part of Rundle Street which included building retail and commercial buildings as well as eating places. Subsequently, Liberman Group acquired the residential portion of the Adelaide Fruit and Produce Exchange building.

Maras resigned from Mancorp in July 2006 and founded Maras Group, which he chaired. His son Steve was made the first CEO and managing director of the Maras Group in 2007. The same year, the Maras family purchased the freehold of the East End site it was occupying on a 99-year lease from the South Australian government.

According to the Portside Messenger, in November 2013, Maras expressed his intention to purchase heritage buildings in Port Adelaide for commercial redevelopment.

In 2018, Maras and property developer James Arsenikakis made an application for 16-storey apartment block development on Hutt Street. The State Commission Assessment Panel gave their approval in January 2020. The appeal lodged by a neighbor against the approval was rejected in 2022, while in 2023, the Court of Appeal rejected the appeal. By 2022, Maras had pulled out of daily operations but retained his position as chair of the company.

=== Public appointments ===
Maras became chair of the Rundle Mall Management Authority in June 2010. He was the chairperson during the redevelopment of Rundle Mall, and he held the position until December 2014 when he was succeeded by his deputy in an acting capacity.

Maras joined the Urban Renewal Authority, also known as Renewal SA, in 2012. In 2013, he was against the unsolicited proposal made by Adelaide Capital Partners to purchase the state-owned land at Gillman due to the lack of current valuation and high potential of the site to accept fill material. Maras left the position as a board member on 2 December 2013. Construction commenced the day the cabinet approved the option deed. He provided evidence to an inquiry of the South Australian Legislative Council in July 2014. In his 2015 report, the Independent Commissioner Against Corruption, Bruce Lander, found that there should have been more consideration given to Maras's advice on valuing the site.

By 2014, Maras became a member of the South Australia Expert Panel on Planning Reform. In that year, he founded Maras Foundation to assist community organisations in such spheres as education, health, sport, and the arts. As early as 2015, Maras managed to lead the fundraising board of the Australian Centre for Child Protection and obtain funding for a chaired professorship in child protection studies.

Maras is one of the founders of the Foundation for Hellenic Studies. In 2016, he won a court case against John Lesses over defamatory material circulated among the Greek Orthodox Community of South Australia in 2011, and he was awarded $75,000 in damages. The following year, the Full Court of the Supreme Court of South Australia granted an appeal by Lesses partially, and the damages were set at $25,000. His application for special leave to appeal was refused by the High Court on 17 April 2018.

Market Square (left) and Adelaide Central Market (right), viewed from Grote Street on 2 June 2026

On 1 August 2020, Maras succeeded Nick Begakis as chairman of the Adelaide Central Market Authority. He held this position, and during his tenure as chairman, he cooperated with the City of Adelaide in expanding the Adelaide Central Market to the former site of the Central Market Arcade in the $600 million Market Square project Construction commenced in 2022. In October 2026, the City of Adelaide declared that the expansion project would proceed in phases and was expected to be fully open by Easter 2027. Maras was still chair of the authority at the time.

=== Philanthropy ===
By 2010, Maras was chairman of Common Ground Adelaide and had been involved in funding its supported accommodation service on Franklin Street. (Note: In May 2010, Santos pledged A$3 million over five years to assist Common Ground in providing affordable housing facilities and support services.) In 2013, he was one of the benefactors contributing Dorrit Black's Still life with jug and ladle to the Art Gallery of South Australia through its Foundation Collectors Club. In 2014, he set up the Maras Foundation to assist community groups in education, health, sport and the arts. As of 2015, Maras had been leading the Australian Centre for Child Protection's fundraising committee in raising funds for a professorial chair in child protection. In a 2016 donor profile, Flinders University acknowledged him as a contributor to its LOGOS Australian Centre for Hellenic Language and Culture.

In 2018, Maras assisted in arranging for the transfer of surplus medical equipment from the former Royal Adelaide Hospital to Kakuma General Hospital in Kenya in cooperation with Barefoot to Boots. In 2024, he proposed on ABC Radio Adelaide that families who could afford the $300 rebate in electricity costs provided by the federal government make a similar donation. The campaign was adopted by Vinnies SA as part of an effort to help families coping with electricity costs and other living expenses. In 2026, Maras along with his former business partner Bill Manos financed Fringe Express, an Adelaide Fringe bus service for taking school children to Fringe shows.

== Views ==
In an interview in 2003 with historian Sharon Mosler, Maras described the rapid growth of office space in Adelaide during the 1980s as artificial, noting that there had been no real demand created by the process.

Maras in an October 2013 op-ed in The Advertiser argued that Adelaide City Council should remove wards and implement automatic enrolment of all residential and business ratepayers in council elections, as well as make voting compulsory. That same month, he and fellow property developer Gerry Karidis urged the government to take steps to encourage more immigration into South Australia. Maras claimed that the Adelaide city centre required 50,000 additional residents to function effectively socially, culturally, and economically.

In January 2022, Maras, who had made donations to the Liberal Party, announced his endorsement of Labor Party leader Peter Malinauskas. Speaking to The Advertiser, he expressed disappointment in Premier Steven Marshall with regard to the opening of South Australian state borders. Maras felt the government could have planned for the possibility of the Omicron strain in advance of reopening. Writing on his LinkedIn profile, he commended Malinauskas's policy ideas regarding young South Australians and hoped to support Labor as he supported the Liberals.

In 2025, Maras urged the federal and state civil servants to work from their respective offices as he felt their presence was going to be helpful for businesses in the city center.

Maras, in a letter published in InDaily in March 2026 in connection with an appointment to the Greek Orthodox church, said that the church itself had to make decisions regarding church matters and that community members were free to express their views publicly. Maras requested Archbishop Makarios to intervene in the dispute.

== Personal life ==
Maras married Helen in 1969. They have three children, including filmmaker Anthony Maras. In 2026, he told Neos Kosmos that he was proud his children and grandchildren spoke Greek and wanted to help maintain Greek culture by passing it on to others.

His family lived in the same heritage-listed house for more than 35 years located in North Adelaide, and he rebuilt and extended the house to suit its architecture. Maras sold the house in November 2016, stating that the house was too big for him. Maras owned property in the city centre, and was planning on building apartments in the area, including the penthouse for the couple.

== Honours and awards ==
Maras was awarded Member of the Order of Australia (AM) in the General Division in the 2008 Australia Day Honours for services to the building and construction industry in South Australia, and the Greek Community.

In October 2013, the South Australian branch of the Property Council of Australia designated Maras and another developer named Gerry Karidis as the first South Australian Property Icons for his work in property development and the community. Also that month, the state branch of the Australian Property Institute named Maras a Property Leader and made him an honorary fellow.

In 2014, the Asia Pacific Brands Foundation awarded Maras the BrandLaureate Great Entrepreneur Brand ICON Leadership Award. On 27 March 2015, he was awarded a university fellowship from the University of South Australia for his service to the university and the South Australian community.

The Advertiser placed Maras at number 48 on its South Australian Power 50 list in late 2023 and included him on its South Australian Power 1000 list in February 2026.
