= Eugen Molodysky =

Australian academic

Prof Eugen Molodysky OAM, MMBS
- Occupation: Clinician
- Known for: Foreshadowing clinical utility of HPV testing
- Awards: Order of Australia (2008)

Academic background
- Education: University of Sydney

Prof Eugen Molodysky ^{OAM, MMBS} is an academic and medical practitioner in preventive medicine and translational research. His research has been published in peer reviewed journals over the last 30 years. His clinical work has contributed to the early identification of HIV/AIDS in the 1980s epidemic in Australia.

He is known for his contribution to research and policy and has been a respected advocate and contributor to preventive medicine across a variety of fields including sexual health, disease prevention and longevity.

== Honours ==
Molodysky was awarded the Medal of the Order of Australia (OAM) in 2008 for service to medical education, through clinical teaching, curriculum and professional development and research into cervical cancer prevention.

In 2015, he was awarded the ACNEM Braham Rabinov Award.

== Notable medical achievements ==
In 1983, during the first days of AIDS, Molodysky was the first primary care physician to identify patients infected with HIV when no specific testing was available, by using the Cell Mediated Immunity (CMI) test. The same year, he established Australia's first HIV clinic, the Eastside Medical Centre, in Paddington. He then established one of Australia's first methadone clinics, at the United Gardens Private Hospital, in Summer Hill.

In 1993, following research into cervical cancer, Molodysky introduced HPV testing as an adjunct to screening for abnormal cervical cells identified on microscopy, to the primary care setting as an early predictor of cervical cancer risk. In 2000, his original HPV research thesis (PhD) foreshadowed the clinical utility of HPV testing. It was not until September 2017, that HPV DNA (automated PCR) testing became the Australian national standard for the early detection of cervical cancer risk in women, and Australia is now on track to eliminate this cancer as a public health problem by 2028.

In 2016, Professor Molodysky published the first edition of the nutritional medicine-based Primary Care Fellowship Curriculum. This seminal document established a platform from which to launch formally, the education and training of primary care physicians in the delivery of preventive medicine in day-to-day clinical practice.

In 2017-20, Professor Molodysky supervised MD Research students to undertake analyses of the prediabetes – type 2 diabetes landscape in Australia.

Heart disease risk assessment

Following briefing at the St Francis Hospital, New York with Dr. Alan D. Guerchi, in 2003 Molodysky introduced Coronary Artery Calcium Score (CACS) testing into the Australian primary care setting as a predictor of coronary artery disease risk. By 2020, the Heart Foundation of Australia added CACS testing to estimate the risk of having a heart attack or stroke.

COVID-19 In 2020, Molodysky developed and introduced the COVID-Safe Workplace Policy for the Fink Group across all its restaurants.

== Key roles and appointments ==
In 1987, he was appointed by Professor Charles Bridges-Webb as the medical ethics lecturer with the Discipline of General Practice at the University of Sydney, and from 1987 to 1996, he assisted in the development of Problem-Based-Learning(PBL). In 1997, when The University of Sydney replaced its six-year undergraduate medical program (UMP) with a new four-year graduate medical program (GMP), this PBL model became a teaching cornerstone across the new curriculum and in all four years of the Program.

In 1989, in collaboration with the RACGP, Professor Molodysky developed and produced Medicine Today, the first Video Education Series for Australian primary care doctors which was hosted by Prof. Kerryn Phelps and Dr. Derek Richardson, and which was launched by the President of the RACGP and the Federal Minister of Health Dr Neil Blewett.

In 1979, Molodysky was instrumental in establishing the N.S.W. College of Osteopathic and Natural Therapies and the Osteopathic Board of NSW (now known as the Osteopathic Council of NSW) which resulted in the formal recognition and registration of osteopathy as a discipline which is now regulated by the Australian Health Practitioner Regulation Authority (AHPRA).

Since 1982, Molodysky has served in a number of key roles, including as the chair of the Medical Education Committee of the NSW Faculty and as a member of both the Medical Education Committee and Prevocational Subcommittee of the National Education Standing Committee under the Royal Australian College of General Practitioners (RACGP), the chair of the Eastern Sydney Division of General Practice (ESDGP) (the forerunner of the Central and Eastern Sydney Primary Health Network), the foundation chair of GP Synergy (previously SIGPET - Sydney Institute of General Practice Education and Training) and as both president and vice president of the Australasian College of Nutritional & Environmental Medicine (ACNEM).

In 1989, as chair of the NSW Continuing Medical Education Committee (CMEC), and as a member of the Medical Education Committee of Council (MECC) of the RAGCP, Molodysky introduced ongoing medical education (QI & CPD) and continuous professional development for primary care doctors which would eventually become mandatory for continual medical registration throughout Australia with AHPRA.

In 2006, he was appointed as a member of the NSW Medical Board by the Governor of NSW and remained a member until 2009, at which time the Australian Health Practitioner Registration Agency (AHPRA) was introduced to supersede the NSW Medical Board.
