= Steve Parish (photographer) =

British born Australian photographer and publisher

Steve Parish OAM
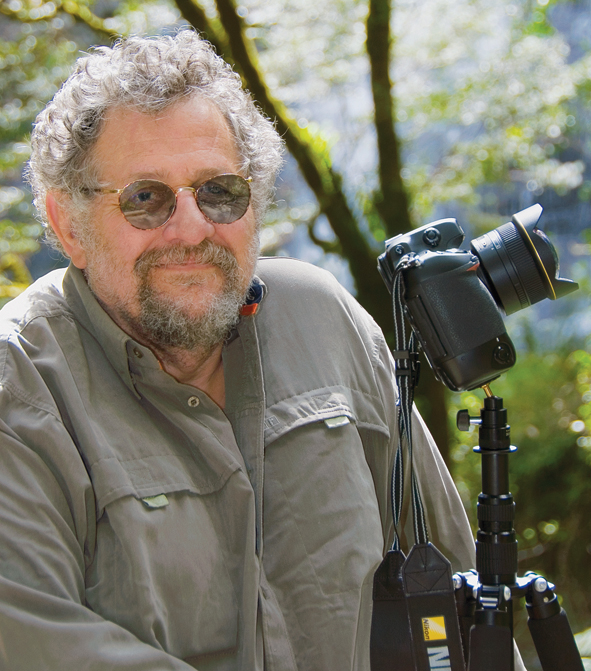
- Parish in 2008
- Born: 15 July 1945 (age 81); Great Britain
- Occupations: Photographer and publisher

Steve Parish is an Australian photographer and publisher. Born in Great Britain in 1945, he is the founder of Steve Parish Publishing, which specialised in creating and publishing photographic information books on nature for adults and children, as well as travel books and souvenirs.

== Early life ==
His attraction to nature observation and study began at an early age as he papered his bedroom with posters of animals and drew and coloured his own wildlife creations. As a child he was a keen spear fisherman and at seventeen a practised hunter who had bought his first rifle at age 16. He had 17 firearms by the age of 18 and worked as an apprentice gunsmith.

Parish was first introduced to photography when he was given the opportunity to join an expedition to Kangaroo Island led by pioneering Australian underwater photographer Igo Oak. Oak was a mentor to Parish and a co-founder of the South Australian Underwater Photography Society.

Parish left school to work halfway through his first year in high school, choosing to educate himself and focus on gaining an understanding of how nature works. He worked with scientists from all disciplines, focussing on the ecology of natural systems, the behaviour of marine fish and Australia's fifty remaining Macropods (Kangaroos and wallabies). He continued to photograph marine life for the Australian Museum. His diving skills increased when he joined the Navy at the age of 18. In 1965 the Navy stationed him in Jervis Bay on the New South Wales coast. The work he was doing for the Australian Museum and the encouragement he got from museum leaders gave him a sense of purpose. While in the Navy stationed in Sydney, Steve joined the New South Wales Underwater Research Group. Here, he met Neville Coleman and Walt Deas. His time photographing in the Jervis Bay area provided much of the material for his first book Oceans of Life.

== Photography and publishing ==
In 1985, Steve Parish launched Steve Parish Publishing. Steve Parish Publishing became an award-winning multimillion-dollar business, at one point employing 125 staff with annual sales of $15 million. The publishing company serviced over 3500 accounts.

Based on the philosophy of inspiring nature connection, Steve and his then partner Jan Parish developed Steve Parish Publishing and in-house writing, editing, photography, photographic library and pre-press Company.

The team then went on to create an extensive Australiana and Natural History publication program across many categories for all ages. Many of the publications, updated and still available, sold in tens of thousands receiving international acclaim.

Due to the Brisbane 2011 floods, Steve was forced to liquidate his publishing brand which was purchased by Pascal Press with whom he continues to develop his Signature Range. In 2021 the Range was returned to Steve Parish Nature Connect to the decline in the retail Industry due to the Covid Pandemic.

=== Primary awards ===
2019, the Australian Institute of Professional Photography awarded Honorary Fellow in recognition for outstanding contribution to the photography industry.

2014, Australian Marine Conservation Society Honorary Life Membership for a lifetime commitment to conservation in Australia.

2012, Australian Institute of Professional Photography Queensland Industry Lifetime Achievement Award Professional Photography.

2008, Steve Parish was awarded the Order of Australia Medal for services to the publishing industry through the publication of Australian nature.
