= Air 424 =

Survival training course for Royal Navy pilots

Air 424 is the four-week survival training course that the Royal Navy gives to its pilots, whether helicopter or fixed-wing.

== History ==
Before the mid-1990s, the survival training course took place at HMS Daedalus in Hampshire. The Royal Navy Survival Equipment School was at Seafield Park, Hampshire. The new £3.25m Royal Navy Sea Survival Training Centre opened at HMS Excellent on Friday 2 March 2012 by Commodore Adrian Nance, who was Commodore from 2004 to 2006 of the Royal Navy Maritime Warfare School at HMS Excellent. HMS Excellent is also the home of the Defence Diving School. In February 1995, the Royal Navy Survival Equipment School (RNSES) became part of the Royal Navy Air Engineering School, which became the Royal Navy Air Engineering and Survival School (RNAESS).

Underwater rescue training was at HMS Vernon in Hampshire until 1985; the new £15m Underwater Escape Training Unit opened in March 2018.

== Structure ==
Royal Navy pilots begin at the Britannia Royal Naval College (BRNC) to do 35 weeks of officer training, then move to 727 Naval Air Squadron to undergo fixed-wing aircraft training on the Grob Tutor; not everyone makes it through this part of naval training. 15% of officers were picked for fast jets, and 85% would fly helicopters. Before any flying, officers would have Flight Grading at RAF Roborough. The pilots then undertake Air 424.

Once Air 424 is completed, the Royal Navy's novice pilots move onto Elementary Flying Training at 703 Naval Air Squadron at RAF Barkston Heath in Lincolnshire, where the pilots effectively gain their pilot's licence after around 60 hours of flying. Helicopter pilots then undertake Basic Rotary Training with the tri-service No. 1 Flying Training School at RAF Shawbury, which takes 24 weeks and around 60 hours of flying; these helicopter pilots then end up at the Search and Rescue Training Unit of 202 Squadron if streamed to fly either Merlin HM2 or Wildcat HMA2. Fixed-wing novice pilots go to 72 Squadron at RAF Valley to fly the Texan. Pilots also cover the additional one-week Initial Sea Safety Course.

Naval pilots have to complete dunker training every two years.

=== Components of the Air 424 course ===
These individual components take one week each.

- Aviation medicine at the RAF Centre of Aviation Medicine in Bedfordshire
- Permissive and threatened environment survival training at the School of Maritime SERE
- Dunker training at the Underwater Escape Training Unit (UETU) tri-service and emergency services' training facility
- Sea survival course

== See also ==
- BOSIET, survival training for helicopter passengers
- Hostile Environment and Emergency First Aid Training (HEFAT), undertaken by journalists
- Lifeboat College, training centre of the RNLI in Poole
- Survival, Evasion, Resistance and Escape of the US military
