= Defence Diving School =

Diver training centre in Portsmouth Harbour, England

- Part of Maritime Warfare School
- Horsea Island, Portsmouth Harbour
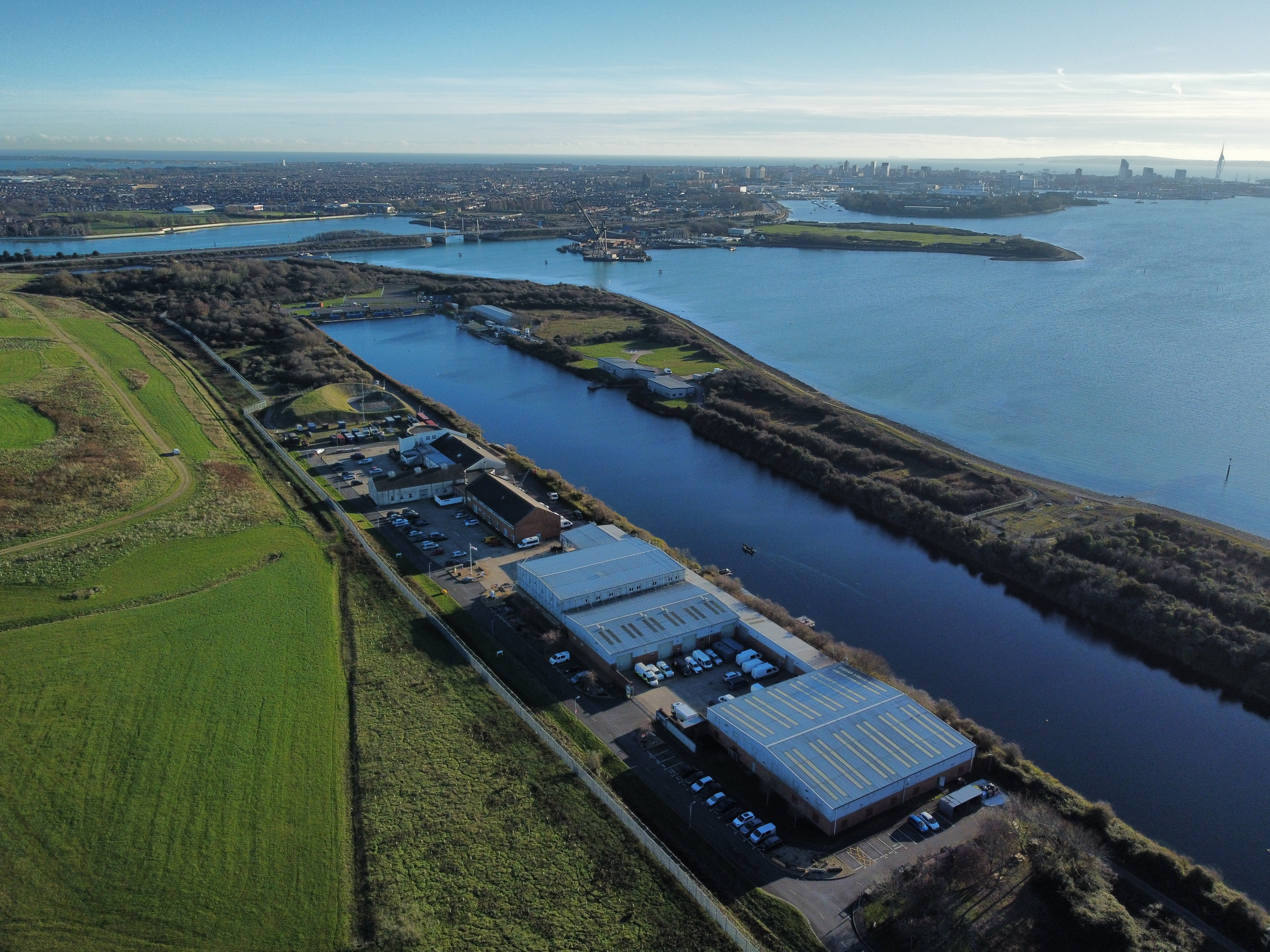

Site information
- Type: Naval shore establishment
- Owner: Ministry of Defence
- Operator: Royal Navy
- Condition: Operational

Location
- Coordinates: 50.836°N 1.099°W

Site history
- In use: 1996–present

The Defence Diving School is a joint service diver training centre on Horsea Island in Portsmouth Harbour, run by the Royal Navy.

== History ==
Construction began in September 1994. It would train around 2000 divers a year.

It opened in September 1995, being previously at HMS Vernon as the Naval Diving School which joined with the Royal Engineers Diving Establishment.

It was officially opened in early 1996, with the Sir Charles Pasley pool, by the Second Sea Lord.

At first, training for the Royal Engineers and the Royal Navy was separate. Three years in the RN was required to apply to be a diver, but this policy was dropped in the late 1990s.

=== Female divers ===
The school graduated its first female mine clearance diver on 19 November 2010, 28 year old Lieutenant Catherine Ker. The Royal Navy had changed its admissions policy for women, after the INM had found that women were at no more risk from decompression sickness (the bends) than men.

== Function ==
Royal Navy Mine Clearance Divers and British Army Divers carry out their basic training at the school's headquarters on Horsea Island, Portsmouth.

Royal Navy divers are part of the Diving & Threat Exploitation Group (DTXG). British Army divers are part of the Royal Engineers or 17 Port & Maritime Regiment of the RLC. Army divers build, repair, and upgrade Army infrastructure underwater. Navy clearance divers identify and neutralise conventional and improvised explosive threats underwater and on ships and oil rigs.

=== Potential Divers Assessment (PDA) ===
All candidates must attend the Potential Divers Assessment (PDA). It is a two-and-a-half-day course that is a pass or fail. First, potential divers must pass the Divers Physical Training Test - a 1.5 mile (2.4km) run in 10.30 min, 8 chin-ups, 16 dips, and 40 sit-ups. Candidates will also be physically assessed on:

- A 1,000-metre lake swim in a dry-suit and fins
- 3m and 6m board jumps with in-water circuits
- A try dive with self-contained breathing apparatus diving to a maximum depth of 5 metres, in an enclosed dive tank on Horsea Island Lake

=== Facilities ===
The facilities include a 1,000m (1km) salt water lake, a 5m diving tank, recompression chambers, and surface and underwater engineering facilities. The school also possesses two Vahana diving boats based at Whale Island for use in the Harbour and the Solent.

Advanced diver training is conducted at Weymouth, Falmouth, Plymouth and the west coast of Scotland.

== See also ==
- Navy Divers, 2009 documentary series
- Royal Navy ships diver
- Underwater Escape Training Unit and Air 424
- United States Navy Experimental Diving Unit
