= Underwater Escape Training Unit =

Military training centre for survival at sea in Somerset, England

- UETU
- Location within Somerset
- Alternative names: The Dunker, Royal Navy Centre of Maritime SERE and Underwater Escape Training Facility

General information
- Type: Training centre
- Location: Somerset, BA22 8HT
- Coordinates: 51.012°N 2.645°W
- Elevation: 15 m (49 ft)
- Completed: 1985
- Inaugurated: 1985
- Client: Fleet Air Arm
- Owner: Royal Navy

The Underwater Escape Training Unit (UETU) is a military training centre for survival at sea in Somerset; the site is mainly for helicopter aircrew.

== History ==
The purpose-built site in Somerset opened in 1985. The Royal Navy previously had underwater breathing training for fixed-wing aircrew at the Royal Navy Air Medical School and had underwater escape for helicopter aircrew in a dunker at HMS Vernon; HMS Vernon trained around 800 rotary wing aircrew a year, and had five naval divers. Civilian offshore workers in the UK are also trained at a dunker in Aberdeen. The 1985 site trained up to 1200 rotary wing aircrew a year.

Aircrew carry STASS (Short Term Air Supply System). Other countries have the Helicopter Aircrew Breathing Device (HABD). STASS was introduced into the Fleet Air Arm in 1992.

The new £15m Underwater Escape Training Unit opened on 27 February 2018. The UETU can train up to 6000 aircrew a year.

== Training ==
The site offers tri-service training for the Royal Navy, Royal Air Force and the Army Air Corps. Foreign countries also train at the dunker too. Fleet Air Arm pilots on Air 424 spend a week at the dunker, and must attend refresher courses every three years.

For STASS training, there is a recompression chamber (diving chamber). There is a HUET system for the Lynx which seats eight, and one for the larger helicopters which seats twelve. There is buoyant ascent training.

== Structure ==
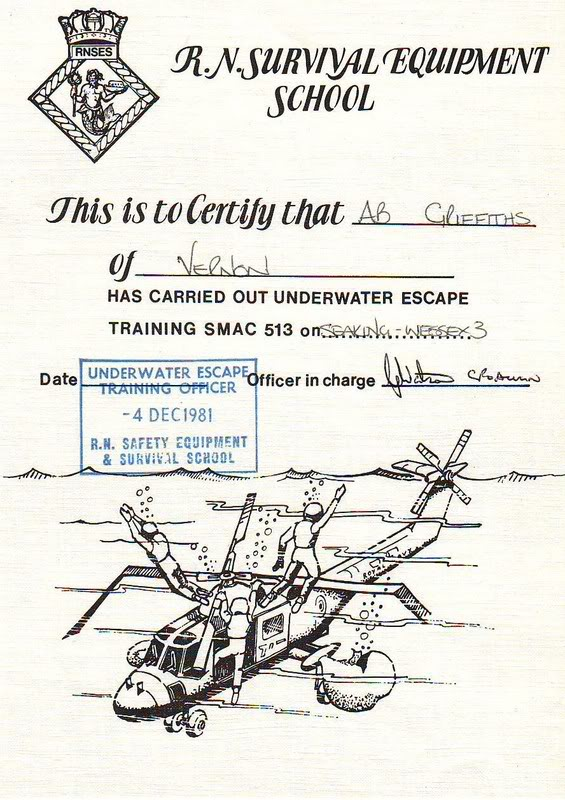
Certification from a course of the RN Survival Equipment School in December 1981

It is situated off the B3151 (former A303), in south Somerset. The dunker operates from Monday to Friday all year. Every three months there is one week of diving training at the site.

There is a 5-metre-deep Dunker pool, a 4-metre-deep Survival Equipment pool, and a 3-metre-deep Short Term Air Supply System pool.

== See also ==
- Index of aviation articles
- Defence Survive, Evade, Resist, Extract Training Organisation in Cornwall, also home of the School of Air/Sea Rescue and the Survival and Rescue Mobile Instruction Unit
- Lifeboat College at Poole in Dorset, has a similar Sea Survival Centre
- The US Marines have a similar dunker at Marine Corps Base Camp Lejeune
- Category:Underwater diving emergency procedures
