= BOSIET =

Offshore safety training course

BOSIET, an acronym for 'Basic Offshore Safety Induction and Emergency Training', is a course aimed at assisting newly employed people of the offshore, oil and gas and renewable energy industries to meet their industry's requirements for offshore safety training, emergency response training and assessment. The norm is regulated by OPITO (the Offshore Petroleum Industry Training Organisation), who publish learning outcomes, guided learning hours and rules of assessment by approved centres worldwide.

A portion of the course is helicopter escape and safety (including HUET), sea survival and minimum first aid, firefighting and self-evacuation, and familiarisation with TEMPSC (lifeboat) procedures. OPITO mandates four units as obligatory and standard guided instruction of approximately 21 hours, dividing classroom theory and controlled environment practical drills; purpose-built "dunker" simulators are employed in swimming pools by most centers for underwater escape practice.

To be able to attend the Basic Offshore Safety Induction and Emergency Training (BOSIET) course, candidates must meet the specified medical requirements. A valid current offshore medical certificate (e.g., OEUK/OGUK) declaring fitness for offshore duties is usually required; where in-water use of a Compressed Air Emergency Breathing System (CA-EBS) is concerned, an additional Fit-to-Train (FTT) screen is used to assess barotrauma risk and suitability for shallow-water CA-EBS training.

Additionally, following the UK Civil Aviation Authority's 2014 offshore helicopter safety review (CAP 1145), the sector moved from rebreather-type EBS towards CA-EBS for offshore helicopter passengers; OPITO introduced dedicated CA-EBS training and integrated it into BOSIET/FOET variants, with digital-delivery options for theory elements in some products. In the United States, Gulf of Mexico operations commonly require HUET with water-survival and CA-EBS per federal aviation programme guidance; non-OPITO HUET courses are used domestically, while OPITO certificates are typically expected for international work.

Following completion of the course, the delegate will have a knowledge of generic hazards and related risks involved in working on offshore installations and the generic safety regimes and safety management systems that exist to control and mitigate risk arising from hazards, with refresher training normally taken through FOET every four years to keep certification up to date.

Regional and sectoral equivalents are available. In the Netherlands, NOGEPA mandates the 0.5A Basic Offshore Safety Introduction and Emergency Response Training and the 0.5B refresher; for offshore wind, the Global Wind Organisation's Basic Safety Training (BST) is implemented for wind technicians. Training facilities typically employ full-scale helicopter fuselage simulators in immersion pools, in some cases in partnership with municipal firefighting/rescue facilities to facilitate realistic rescue simulations.
