= RAF Wig Bay =

Former Royal Air Force station in Dumfries and Galloway, Scotland

RAF Wig Bay
- Dumfries and Galloway in Scotland

Site information
- Owner: Air Ministry
- Operator: Royal Air Force
- Controlled by: RAF Coastal Command

Location
- Shown within Dumfries and Galloway RAF Wig Bay (the United Kingdom)
- Coordinates: 54°58′06″N 5°04′10″W

Site history
- Built: 1914
- In use: 1914-1957
- Battles/wars: First World War; European theatre of World War II; Cold War

Royal Air Force Wig Bay, or more simply RAF Wig Bay, is a former Royal Air Force station near Stranraer, Dumfries and Galloway, Scotland.

The following squadrons were here at some point:

- No. 209 Squadron RAF
- No. 210 Squadron RAF
- No. 228 Squadron RAF
- No. 240 Squadron RAF
- No. 413 Squadron RCAF
- No. 490 Squadron RNZAF
- Flying Boat Training Squadron RAF
- Seaplane Training Squadron RAF

Units

- Detachment of No. 4 (Coastal) Operational Training Unit RAF (February 1942 - ?)
- No. 11 Flying Boat Fitting Unit (July - October 1943)
- No. 57 Maintenance Unit RAF (October 1943 - October 1951)
- Flying Boat Servicing Unit (March - September 1942) became No. 1 Flying Boat Servicing Unit (September 1942 - February 1944)
