= Bell 412 =

Utility transport helicopter family by Bell

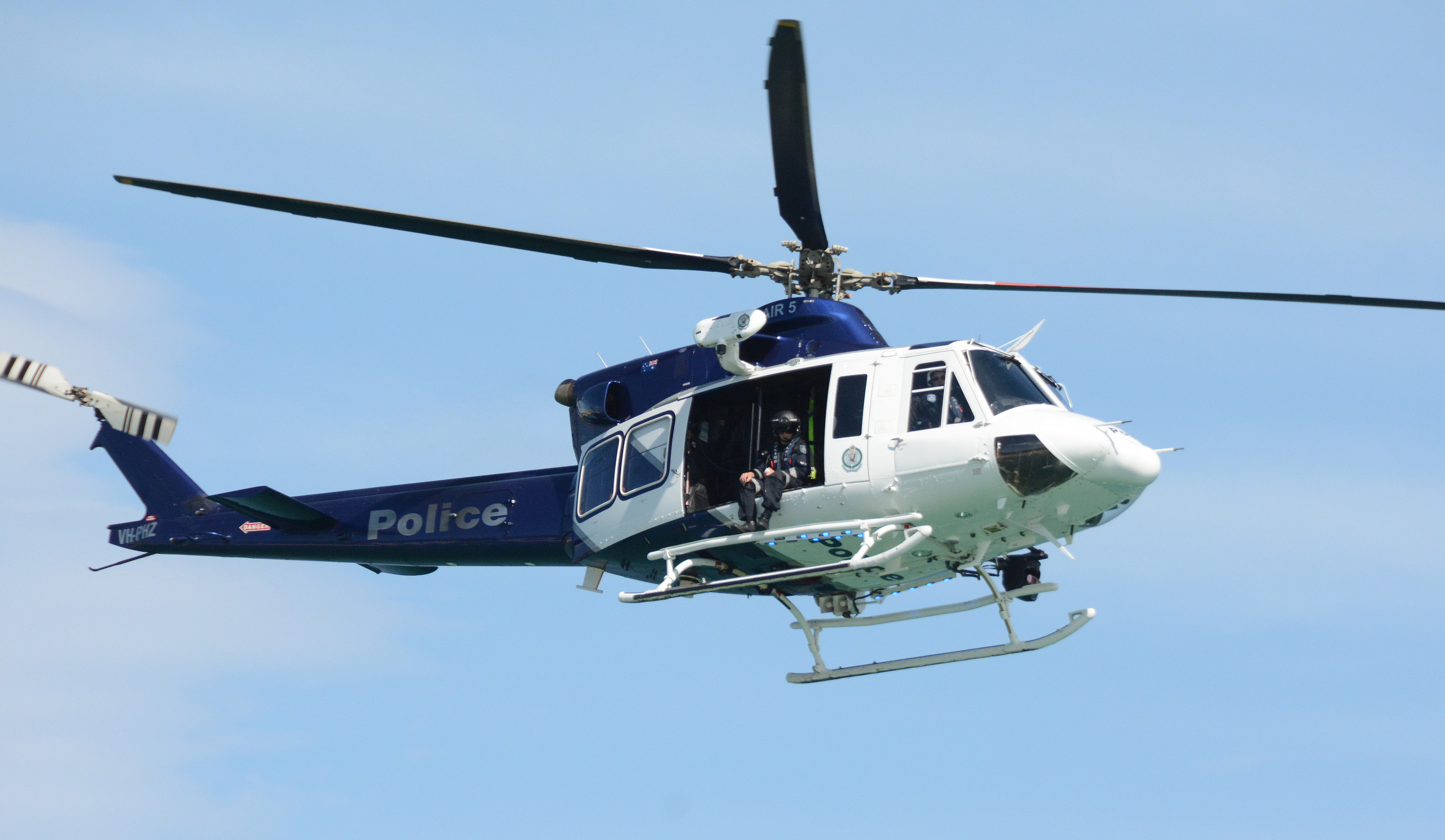
- Bell 412EP of the NSW Police Sydney

General information
- Type: Multipurpose utility helicopter
- National origin: United States/Canada
- Manufacturer: Bell Helicopter
- Primary users: Japan Ground Self Defence Force See Operators for others
- Number built: 1,300+

History
- Manufactured: 1979–present
- Introduction date: 1981; 45 years ago
- First flight: August 1979; 47 years ago
- Developed from: Bell 212
- Variant: Bell CH-146 Griffon

The Bell 412 is a utility helicopter of the Huey family manufactured by Bell Helicopter. It is a development of the Bell 212, with the major difference being the composite four-blade main rotor. It is a twin-turbine helicopter that has been popular on the civilian and military markets, and major users include Canada, Italy, and Japan. Several hundred have been produced since its introduction in 1979, and several iterations of upgrades and variations have been produced, such as with upgraded cockpit electronics.

It has been manufactured under license by Agusta in Italy as the Agusta-Bell AB412, in Indonesia by Indonesian Aerospace, and in Japan by Fuji Heavy Industries. The CH-146 Griffon, a Bell 412 variant for the Canadian Armed Forces, is manufactured in Bell-Textron's main commercial factory in Mirabel, Quebec.

== Design and development ==
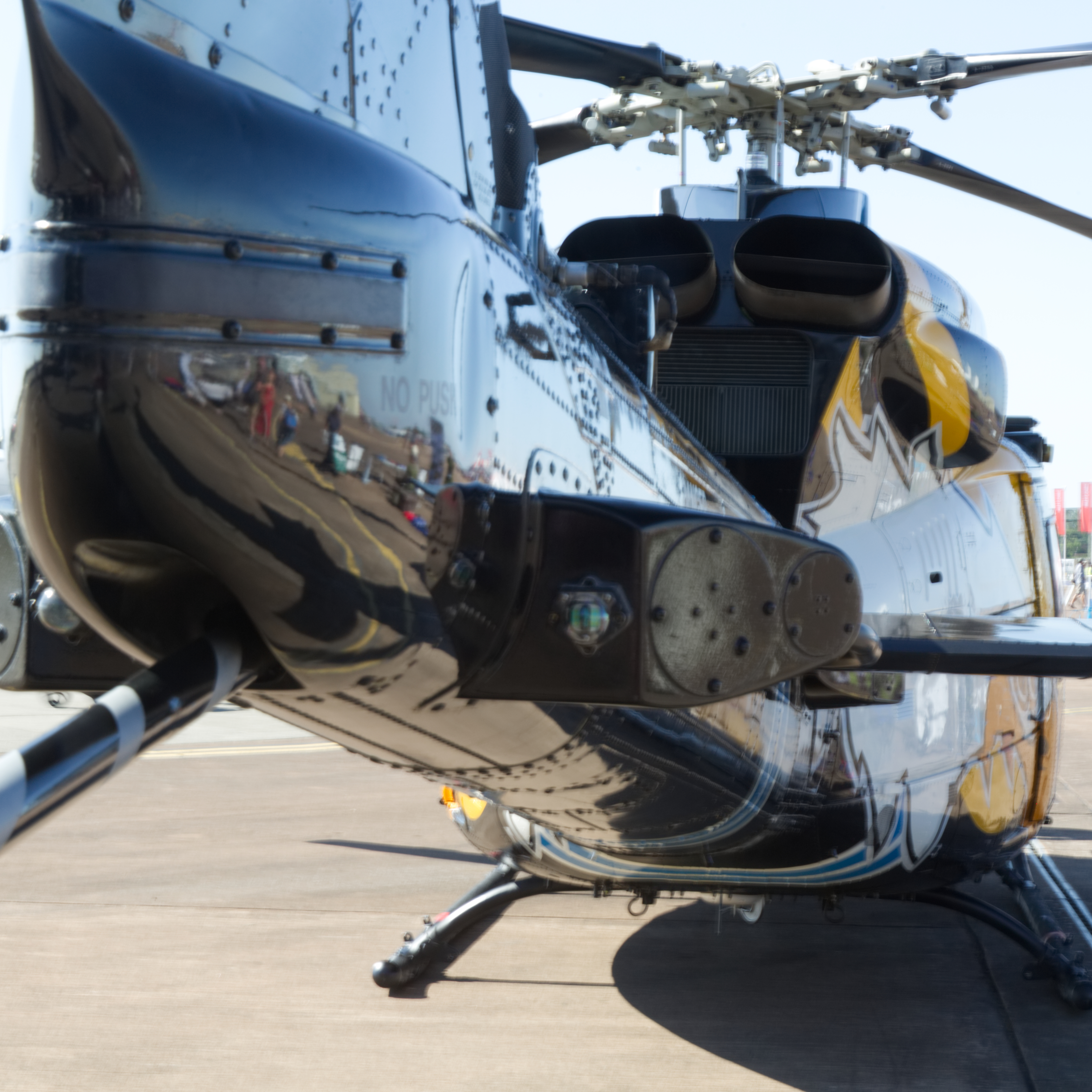
Bell 412CF looking forward from the tail

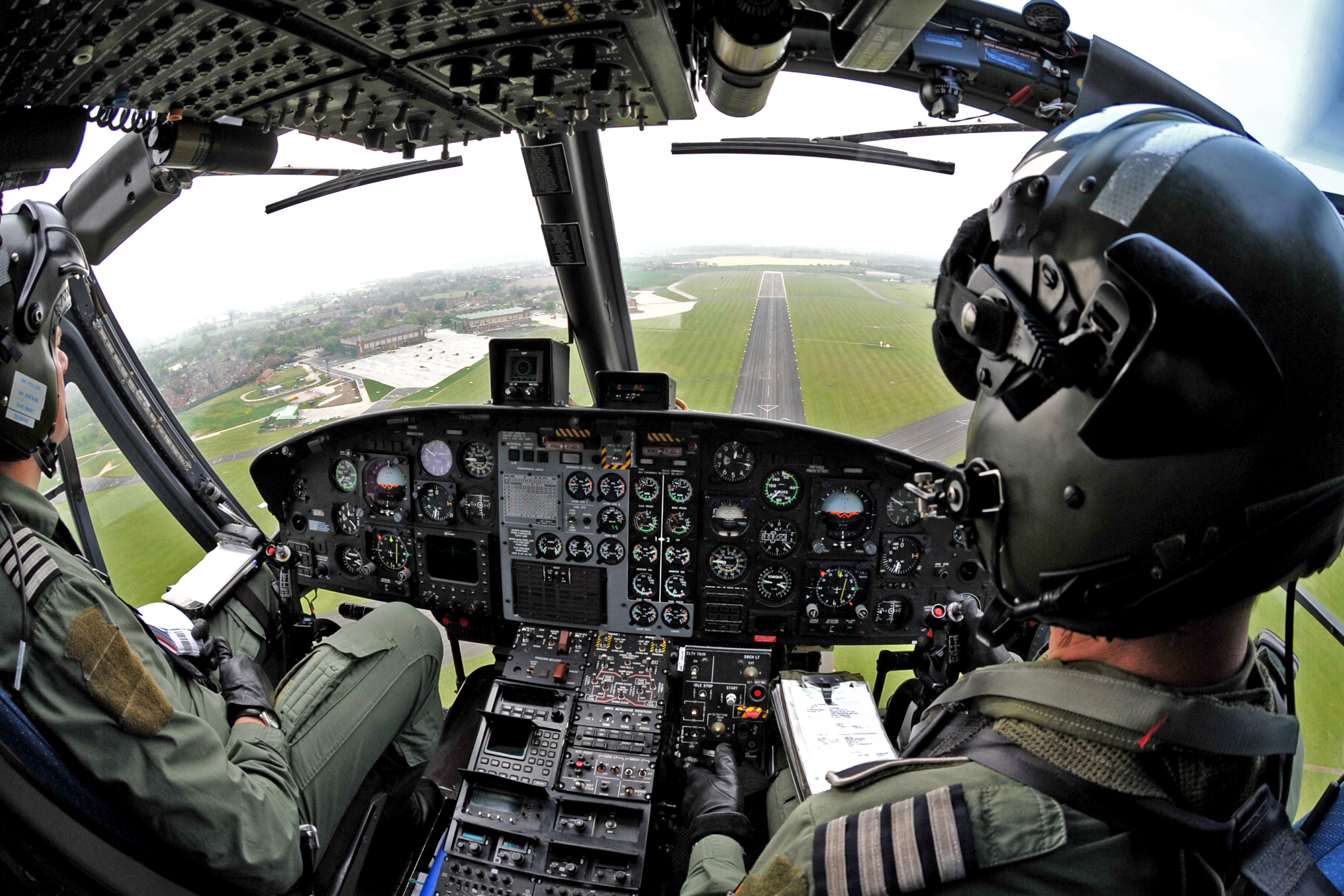
Bell 412 on approach

Development began in the late 1970s, with two Bell 212s being converted into 412 prototypes. An advanced four-blade main rotor with a smaller diameter replaced the 212's two-blade rotor. A Bell 412 prototype first flew in August 1979. The initial model was certified in January 1981, with deliveries commencing in the same month. The 412 model was followed by the 412SP (Special Performance) version, which featured a larger fuel capacity, a higher takeoff weight, and optional seating arrangements. In 1991, the 412HP (High Performance) variant with improved transmission replaced the SP version in production.

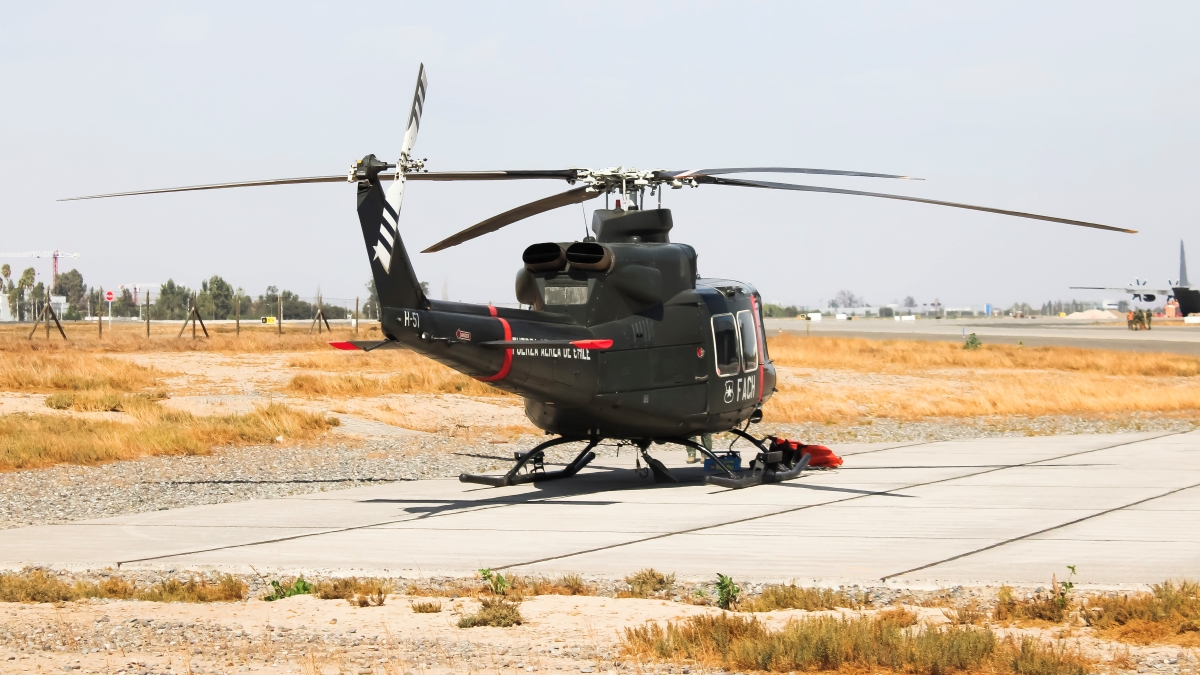
A Chilean Air Force Bell 412

In the early 2000s, Bell offered the Bell 412EP as its Bell 412 LUH entrant in the U.S. Army Light Utility Helicopter program, where it competed against several other light helicopters for an order.

The current production version, 412EP (Enhanced Performance), is equipped with a dual digital automatic flight control system. In 2013, Bell introduced the 412EPI, which includes an electronic (digital) engine control upgrade for the PT6T-9 engine, and a glass cockpit display system similar to the one installed on the Bell 429. Also featured is a Garmin touchscreen navigation system, plus the BLR Strake and Fast Fin upgrades for improved hover performance.

The helicopter is powered by the Pratt and Whitney Canada twin-pack power plant with two turboshaft engines and has achieved the lowest in-flight shut-down rate of aircraft turboshaft engines. If one engine is shut down, a single engine can produce emergency power for 30 minutes.

The aircraft has been produced in Montreal, Canada, in Italy under license by Agusta, in Indonesia by Indonesian Aerospace, and also in Japan by Subaru (Fuji Heavy Industries). The Bell 412 was also initially manufactured in Texas, USA.

The emergency medical configuration can carry 6 patients/wounded and two attendants, or two stretchers and up to four attendants.

By 2022, over 1,300 Bell 412 helicopters had been delivered.

== Variants ==
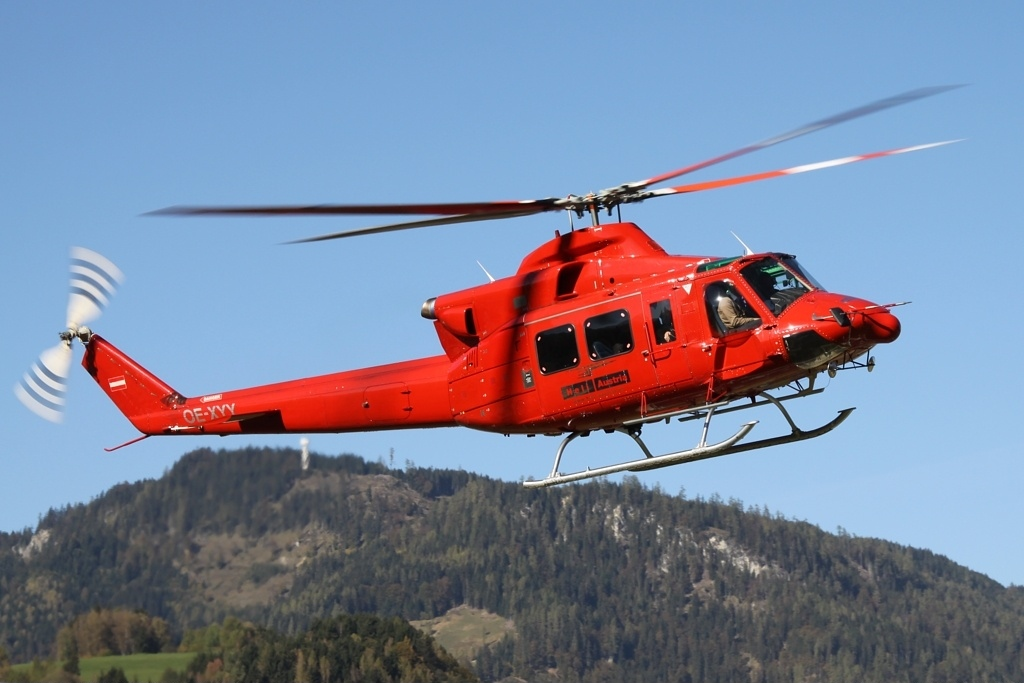
Bell 412HP of Heli Austria

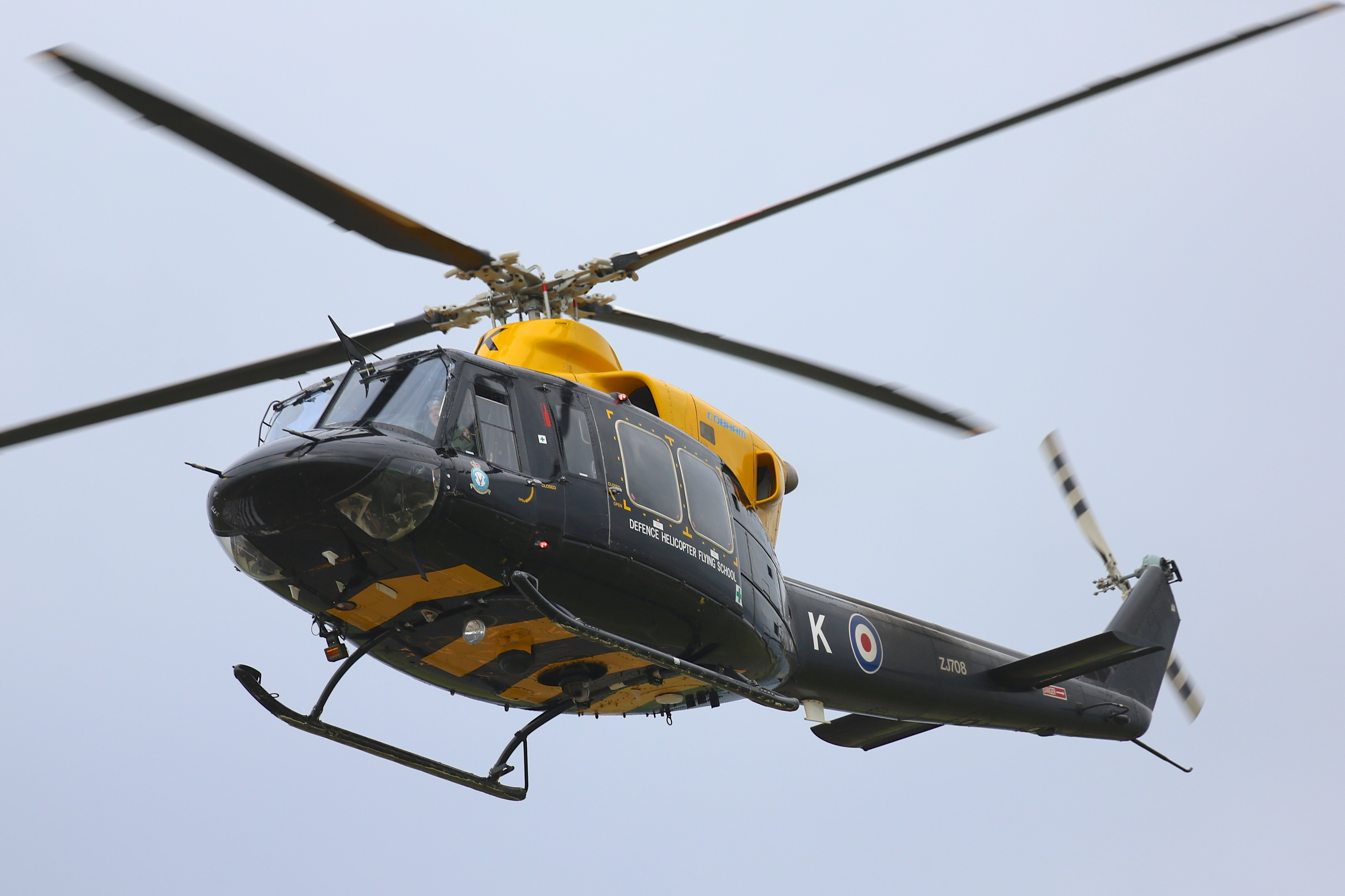
RAF Griffin HT1

Bell 412
Standard Model with P&WC PT6T-3B
Bell 412SP
Special Performance version with P&WC PT6T-3BF engines
Bell 412HP
High performance version with P&WC PT6T-3BG or -3D engines
Bell 412CF (CH-146 Griffon)
100 custom-built utility transport helicopters for the Canadian Forces, based on 412EP and designated by Bell as 412CF
Bell 412EP
Enhanced performance version with P&WC PT6T-3DF engines
Bell 412EPI
Glass cockpit version with P&WC PT6T-9 electronic controlled engines
Bell 412EPR
Modernization program for Bell 412EP, which includes glass cockpit and new avionics.
Bell Griffin HT1
Advanced training helicopter based on the Bell 412EP, operated by the Royal Air Force (RAF) between 1997 and 2018 as an advanced flying trainer. Operated by the Defence Helicopter Flying School at RAF Shawbury and the Search and Rescue Training Unit at RAF Valley.
Bell Griffin HAR2
Search and Rescue helicopter based on the Bell 412EP, operated by No. 84 Squadron RAF between 2003 and 2023 at RAF Akrotiri in Cyprus.
Agusta-Bell AB 412
Civil utility transport version, built under license in Italy by Agusta.
Agusta-Bell AB 412EP
Italian-built version of the Bell 412EP.
Agusta-Bell AB 412 Grifone
Military utility transport version, built under licence in Italy by Agusta.

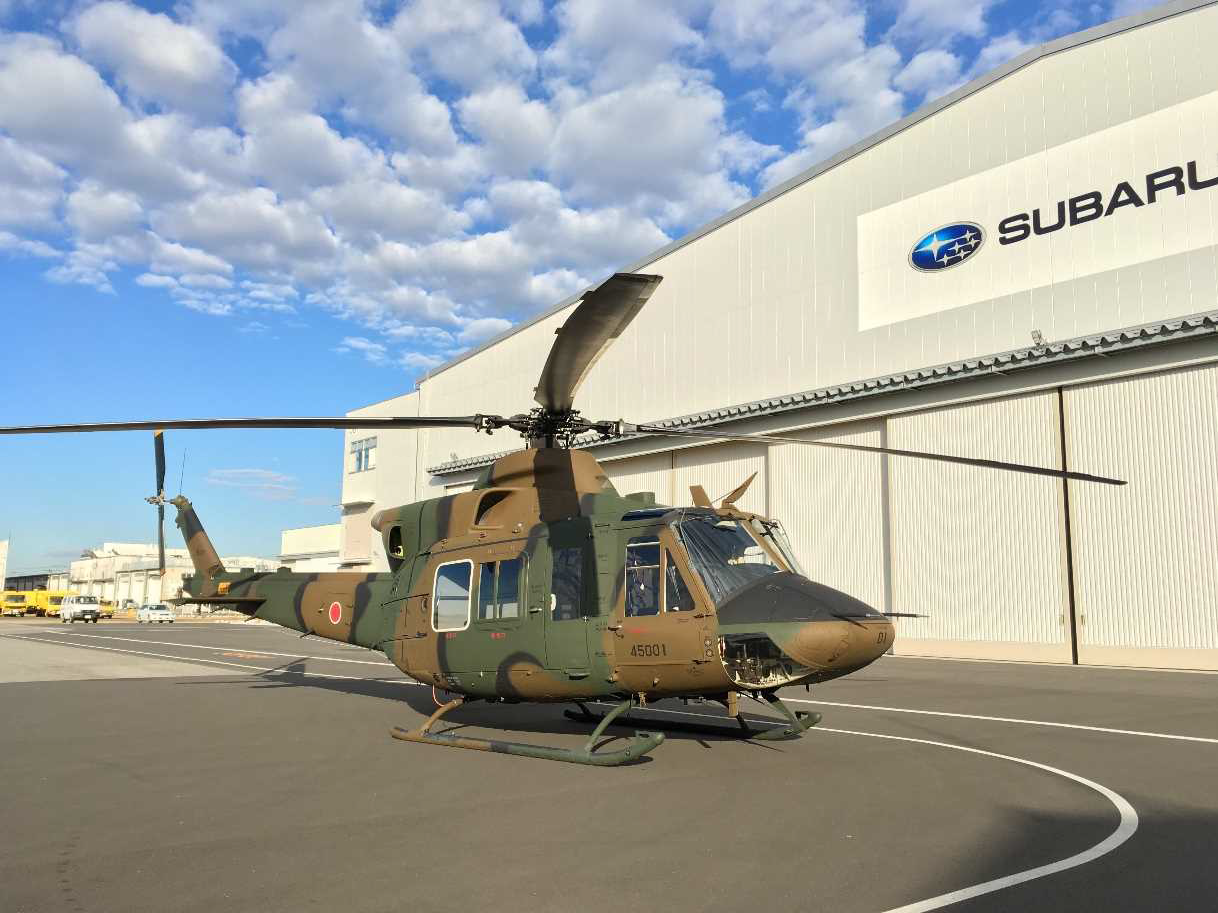
UH-X prototype

Agusta-Bell AB 412 CRESO
Italian-built version, fitted with a ground surveillance radar.
Bell 412 LUH
Entry for the U.S. Army Light Utility Helicopter (LUH) program. Lost to the EC145 entry (see UH-72 Lakota)
IPTN / Indonesian Aerospace NBell 412
Indonesian Aerospace's (formerly IPTN) licensed product of Bell 412.
Indonesian Aerospace Gandiwa
Proposed tandem-seat attack helicopter design based on NBell 412 developed by Indonesian Aerospace and Indonesian Army Research and Development Service in 2012–2014. Development was discontinued due to poor potential sales.
Subaru-Bell UH-2 (Formerly known as UH-X)
Modified version of the Bell 412 EPI; 150 on order to meet the JGSDF's requirement for a UH-1J replacement.
Subaru-Bell 412EPX
Commercial version of UH-X.
H.1B
(Thai: ฮ.๖ข) Royal Thai Armed Forces designation for the Bell 412.
H.1C
(Thai: ฮ.๖ค) Royal Thai Armed Forces designation for the Bell 412(HP)SP.
H.1E
(Thai: ฮ.๖ง) Royal Thai Armed Forces designation for the Bell 412EP.
H.LL.2
(Thai: ฮ.ลล.๒) Royal Thai Navy designation for the Bell 412.

== Operators ==
The Bell 412 is used by private and commercial operators. It is particularly popular in the oil industries, military, law enforcement, and for medevac use. Around 2022-23, the unit cost for a 412EPX model was between US$14.5 million and US$16 million.

=== Military operators ===
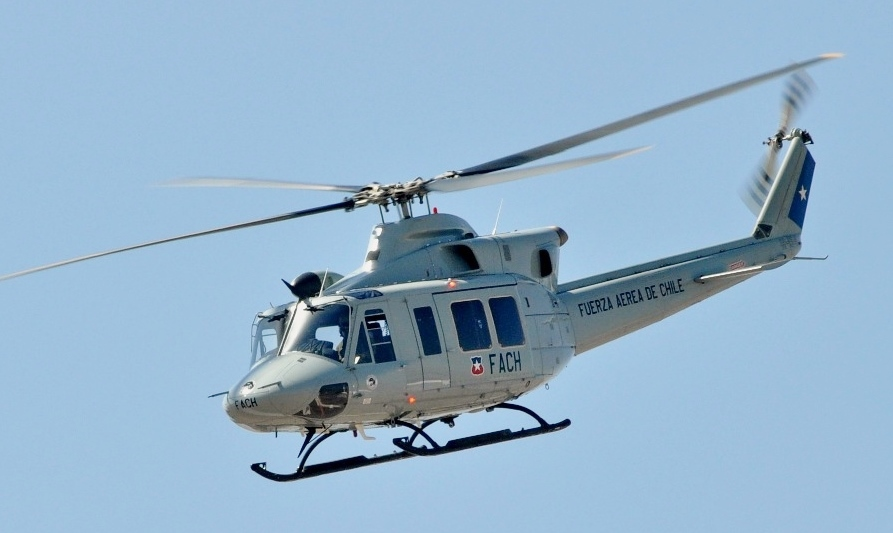
Chilean Air Force Bell 412

Algeria
Algerian Air Force
Argentina
Argentine Air Force
Australia
Australian Army : 2 under lease at Army Aviation Training Center.
Azerbaijan
Azerbaijani Air Force
Bahrain
Bahraini Air Force
Botswana
Botswana Defence Force
Cameroon
Cameroon Air Force

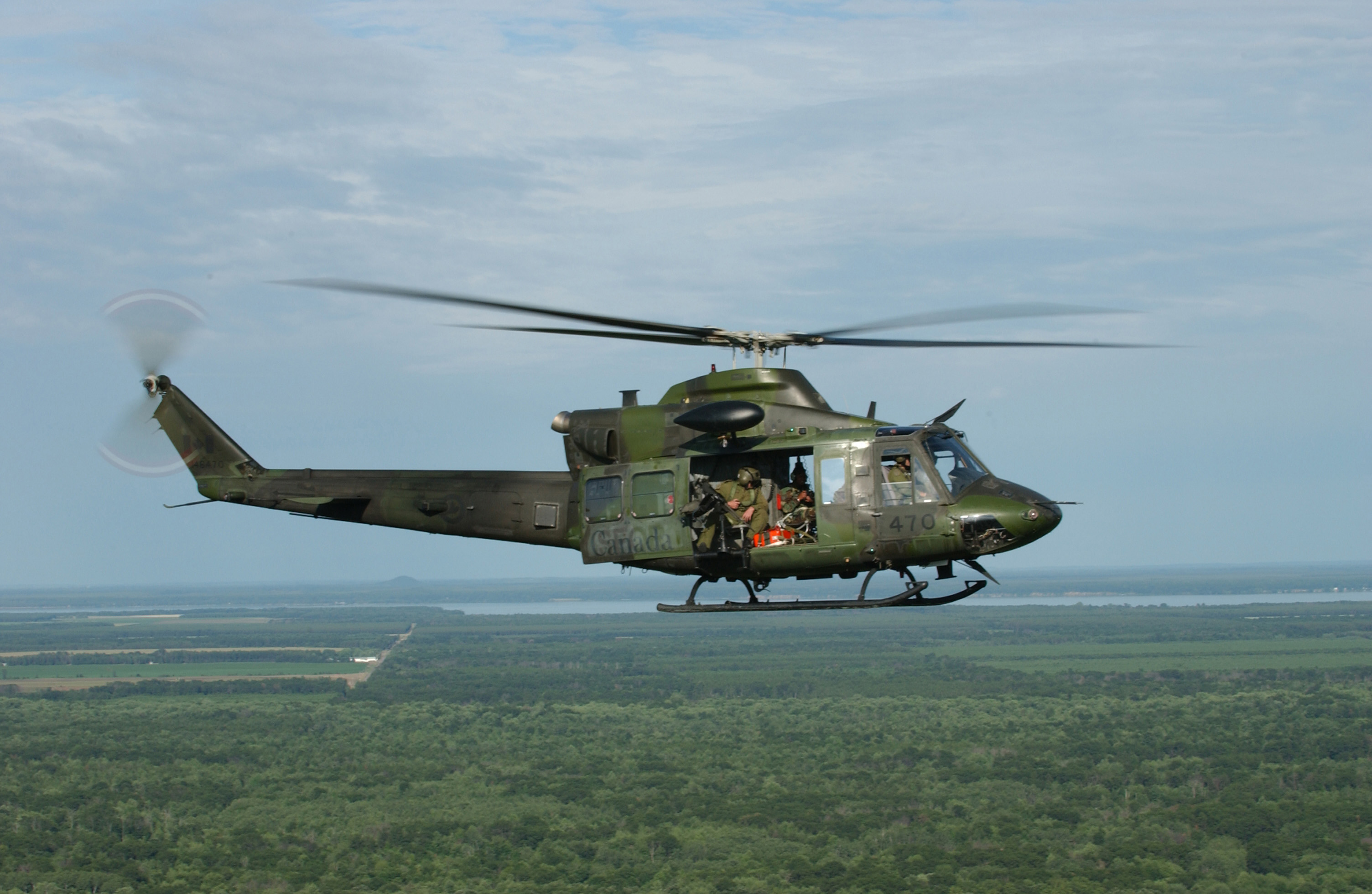
Canadian CH-146 Griffon

Canada
Royal Canadian Air Force
3 Canadian Forces Flying Training School (3e École de pilotage des Forces canadiennes)
Chile
Chilean Air Force
Colombia
Colombian Navy
Cyprus
Cypriot National Guard
El Salvador
Salvadoran Air Force
Eritrea
Eritrean Air Force

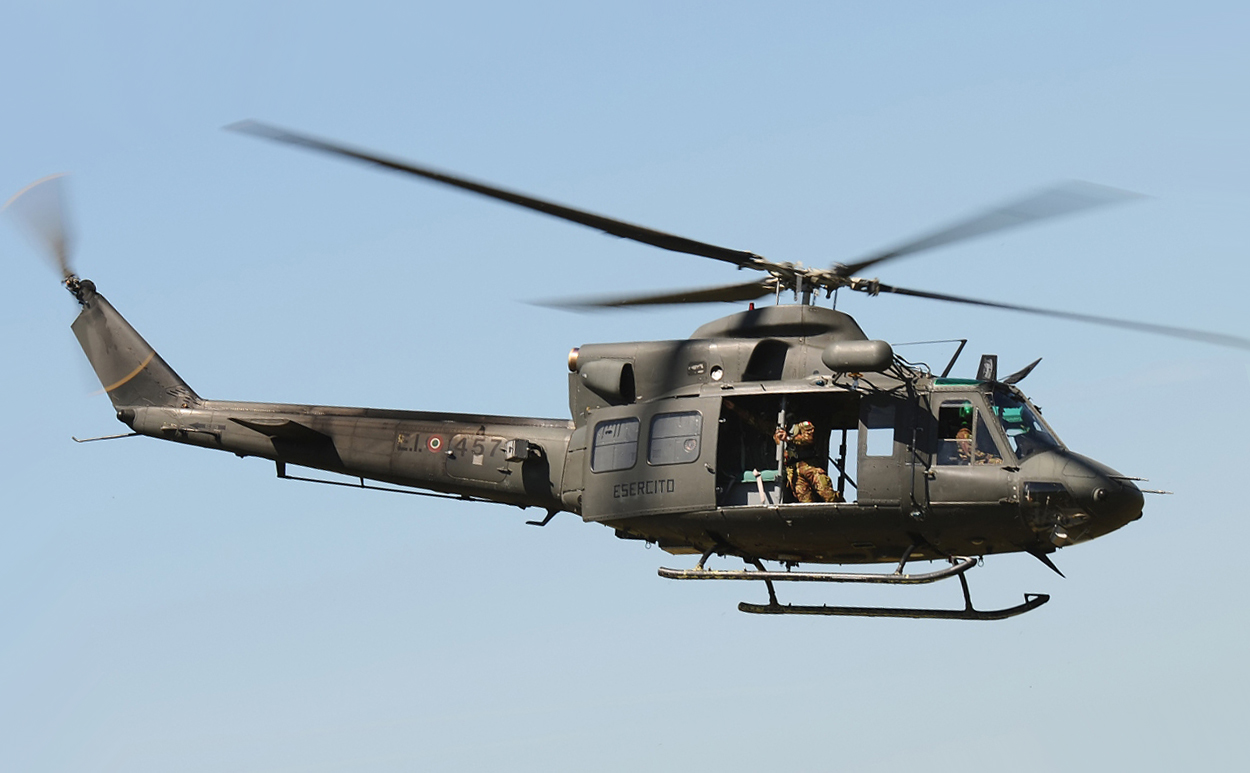
Agusta-Bell AB-412 of the Italian Army

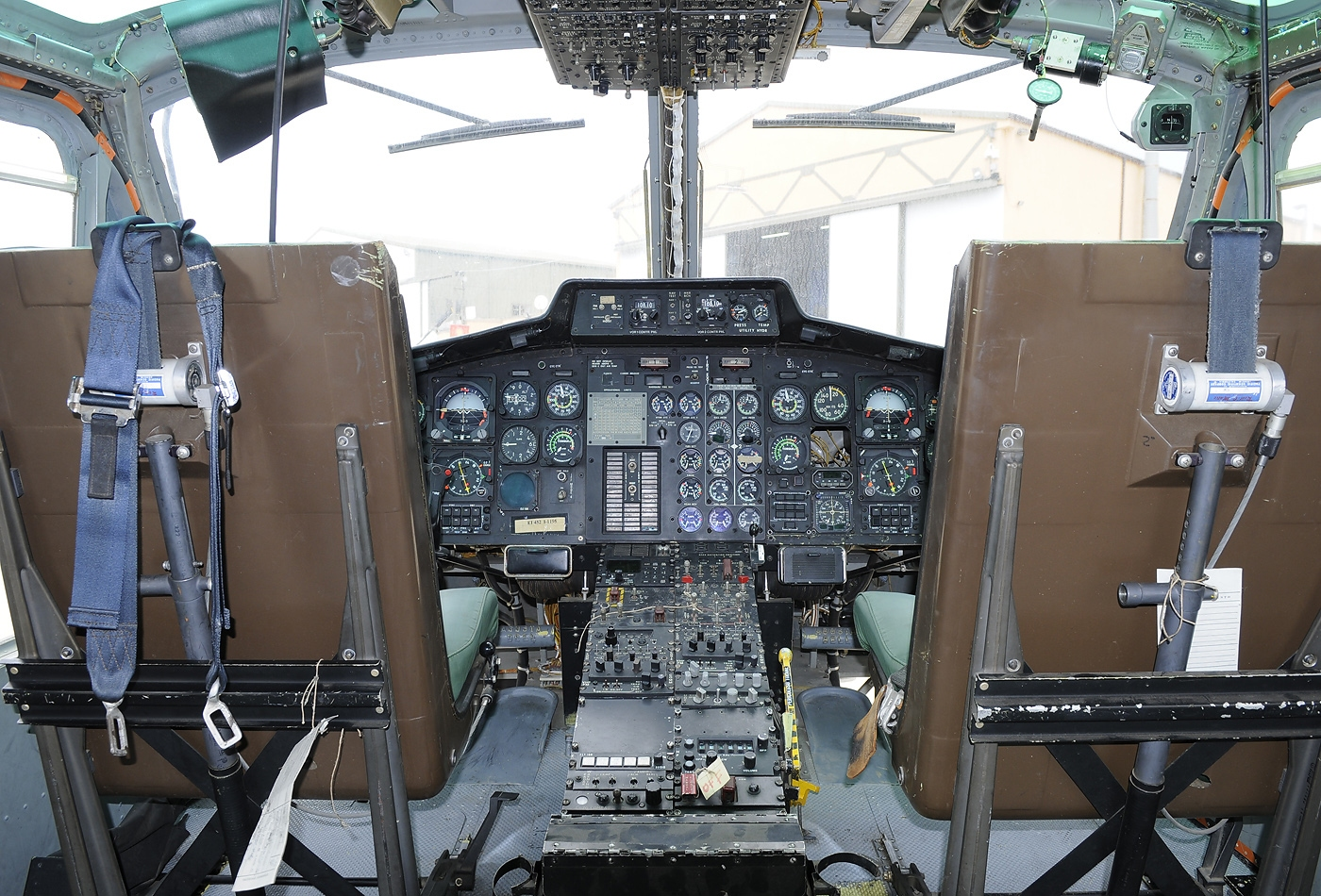
AB-412 cockpit

Ghana
Ghana Air Force
Guatemala
Guatemalan Air Force
Guyana
Guyana Defence Force
Honduras
Honduran Air Force
Indonesia
Indonesian Army
Indonesian Navy
Italy
Italian Army
Iraq
412M on order.
Jamaica
Jamaica Defence Force

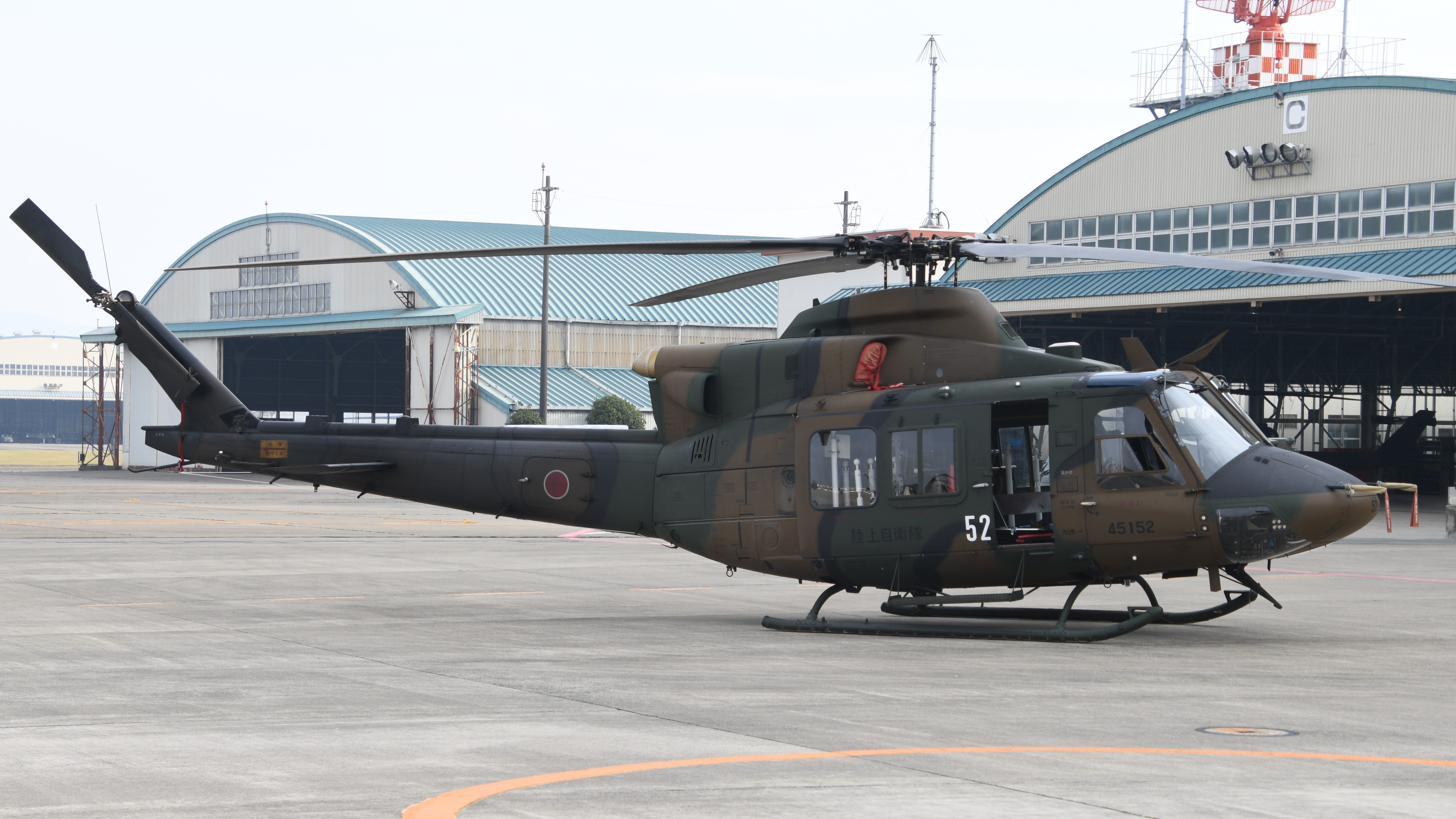
JGSDF UH-2 in November 2023 at Camp Akeno, Japan

Japan
Japan Ground Self Defence Force
Lesotho
Lesotho Defence Force

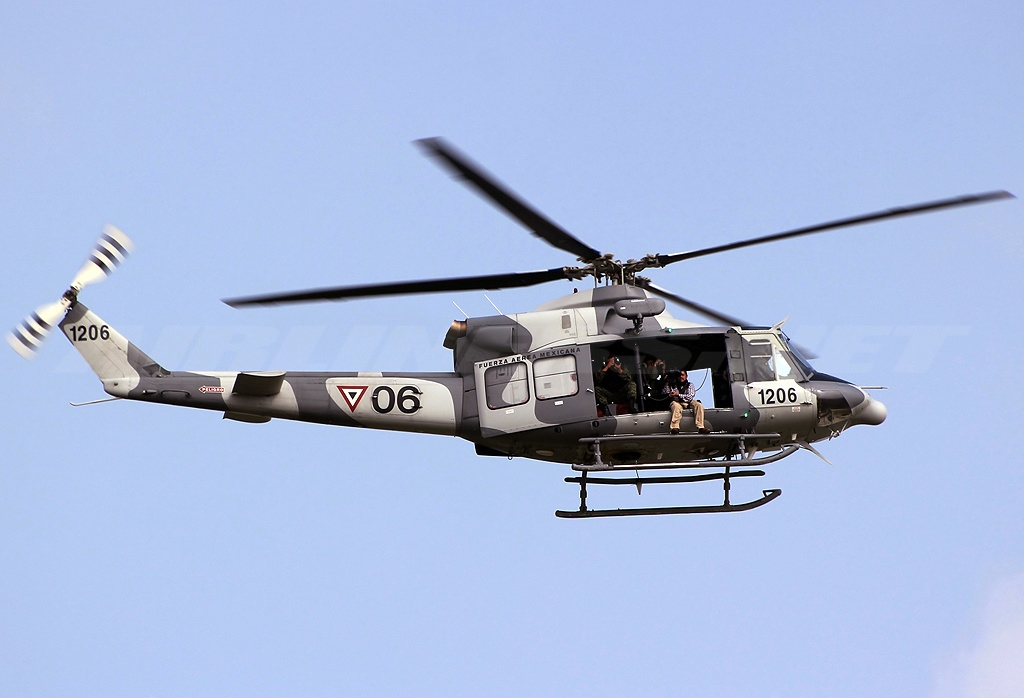
Mexican Air Force Bell 412EP, 2012

Mexico
Mexican Air Force
Montenegro
Montenegrin Air Force
Morocco
Moroccan Navy
Nigeria
Nigerian Air Force
Norway
Royal Norwegian Air Force
Pakistan
Pakistan Air Force
Pakistan Army

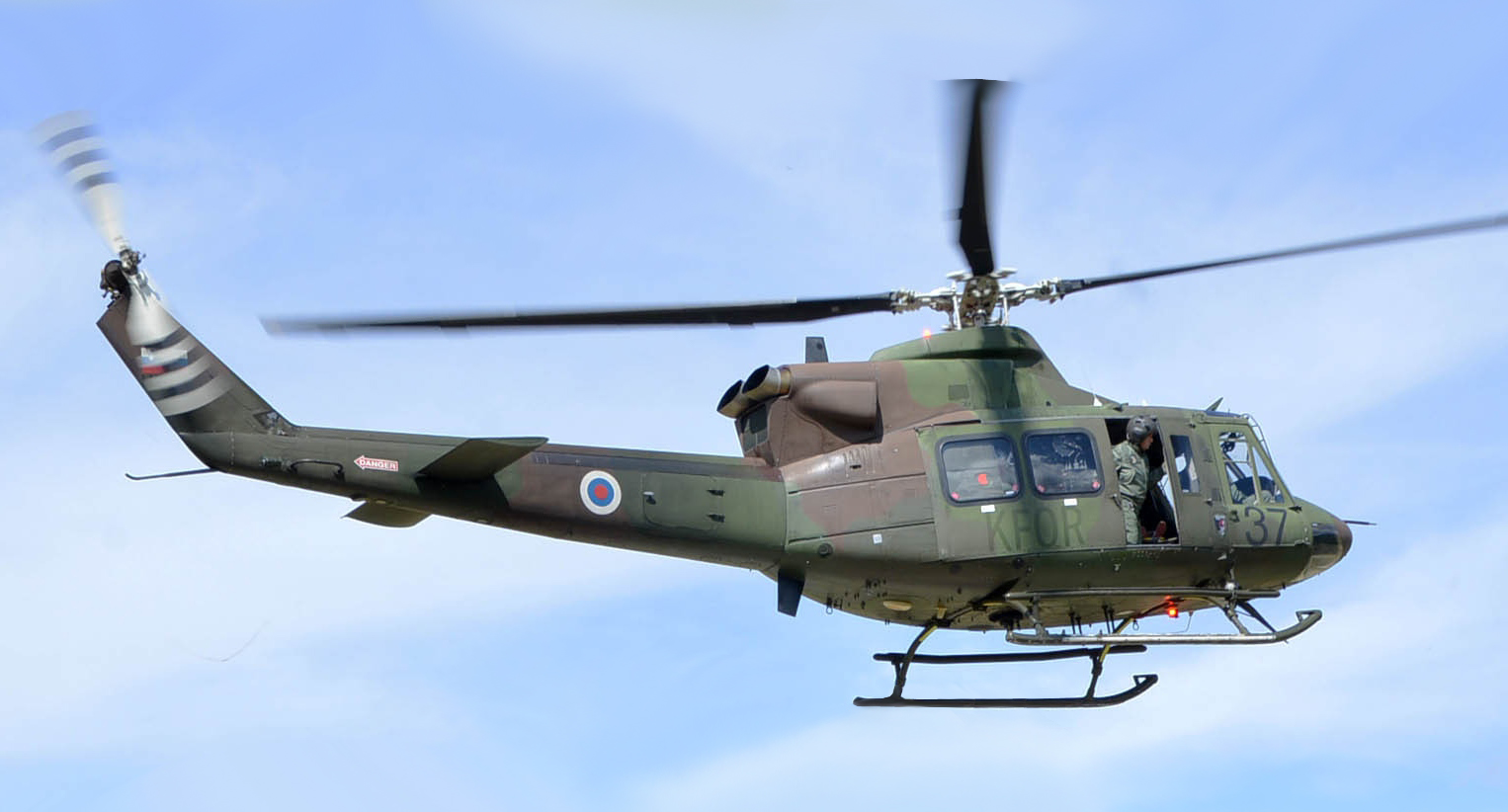
A Slovenian Air Force Bell 412

Panama
National Aeronaval Service of Panama
Peru
Peruvian Air Force
Peruvian Navy
Philippines
Philippine Air Force
Philippine Army
Saudi Arabia
Royal Saudi Air Force
Slovenia
Slovenian Air Force
Somalia
Somali Air Force

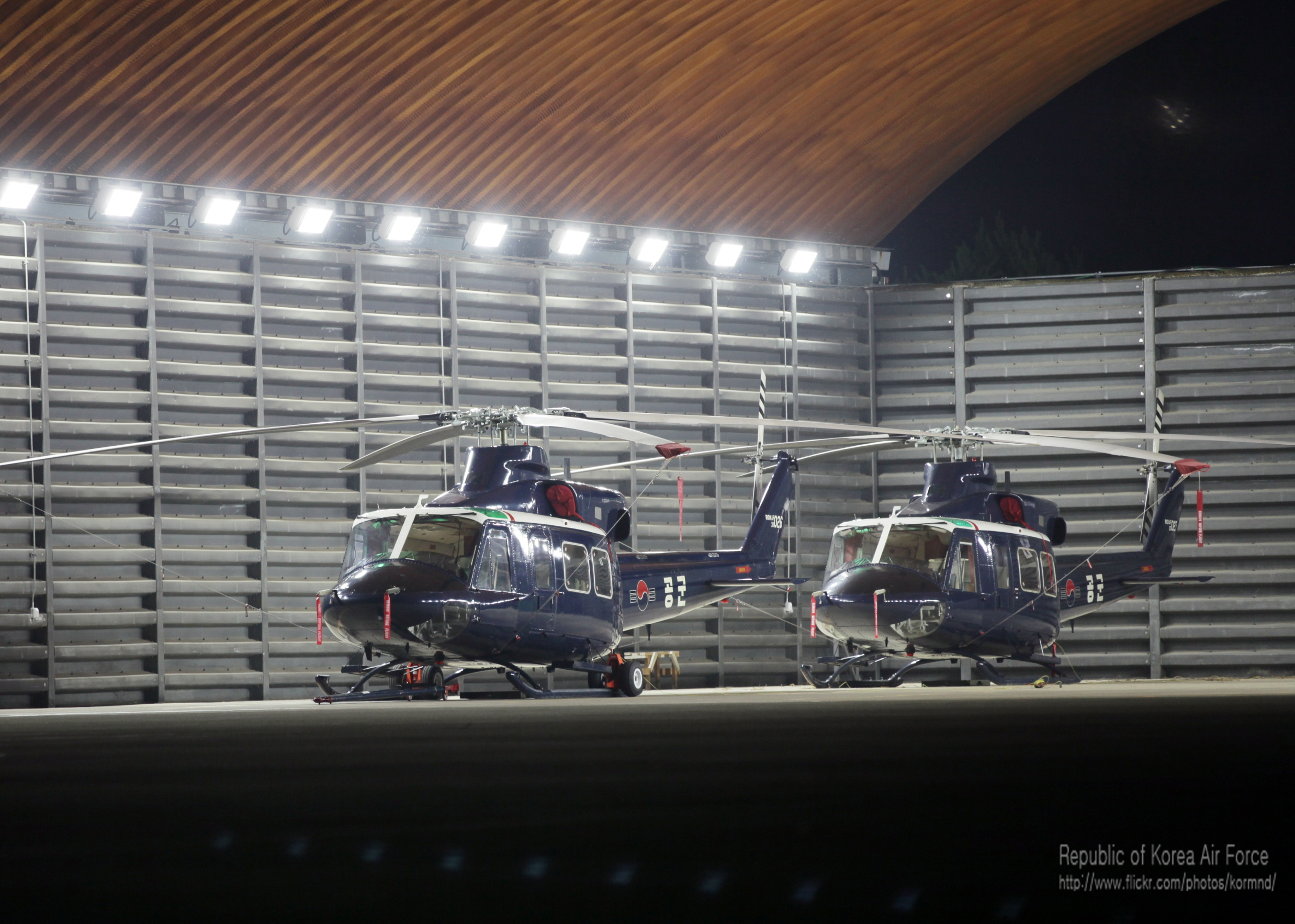
Two Bell 412 of the Republic of Korea Air Force

South Korea
South Korean Air Force
Sri Lanka
Sri Lanka Air Force
Tanzania
Tanzania Air Force Command

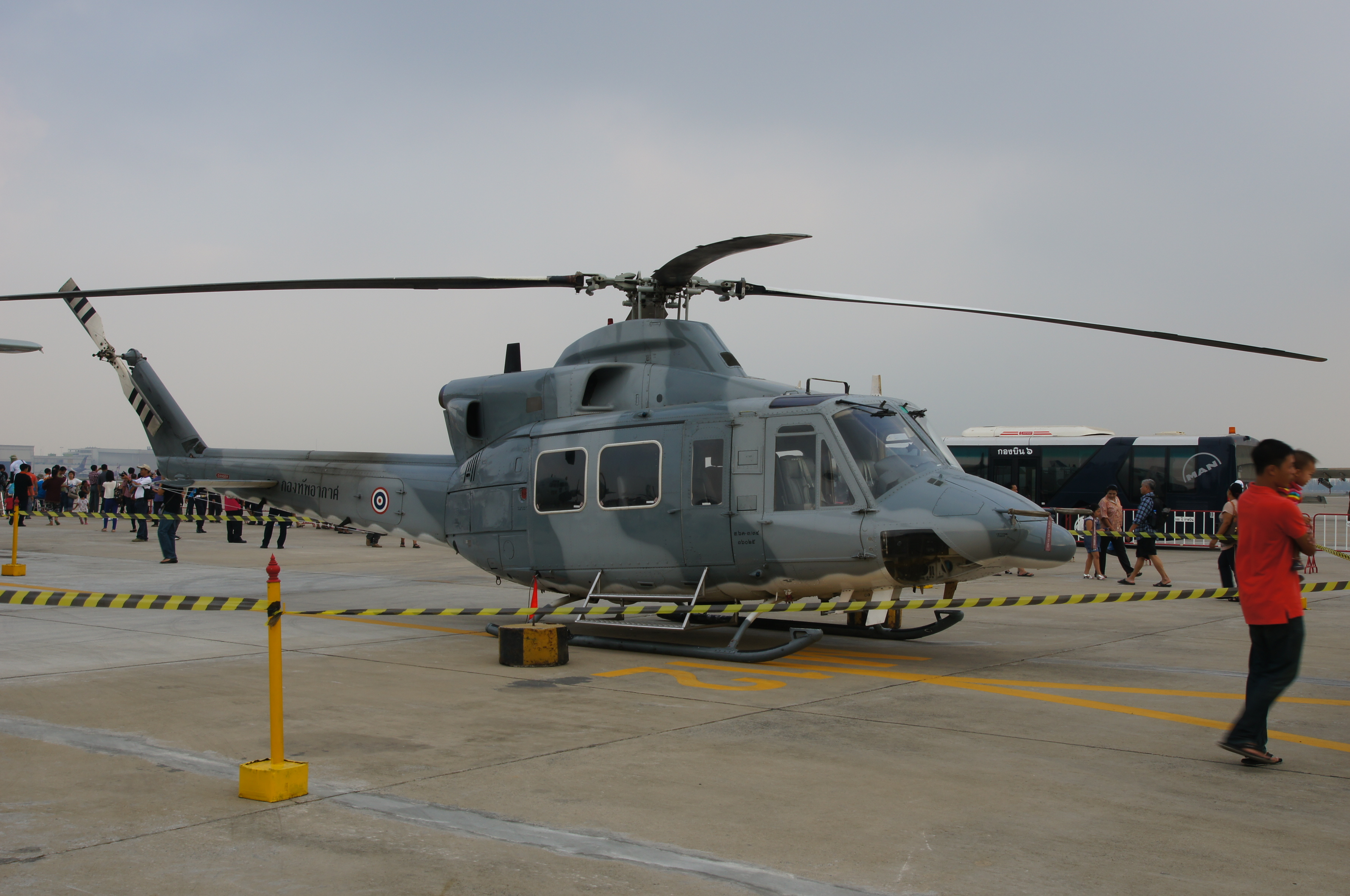
A 412 of the Royal Thai Air Force

Thailand
Royal Thai Air Force
Tunisia
Tunisian Air Force
Turkey
Turkish Coast Guard
United Arab Emirates
United Arab Emirates Air Force
Uruguay
Uruguayan Navy
Venezuela
Venezuelan Army
Venezuelan Navy
Zambia
Zambian Air Force
Zimbabwe
Air Force of Zimbabwe

=== Government operators ===
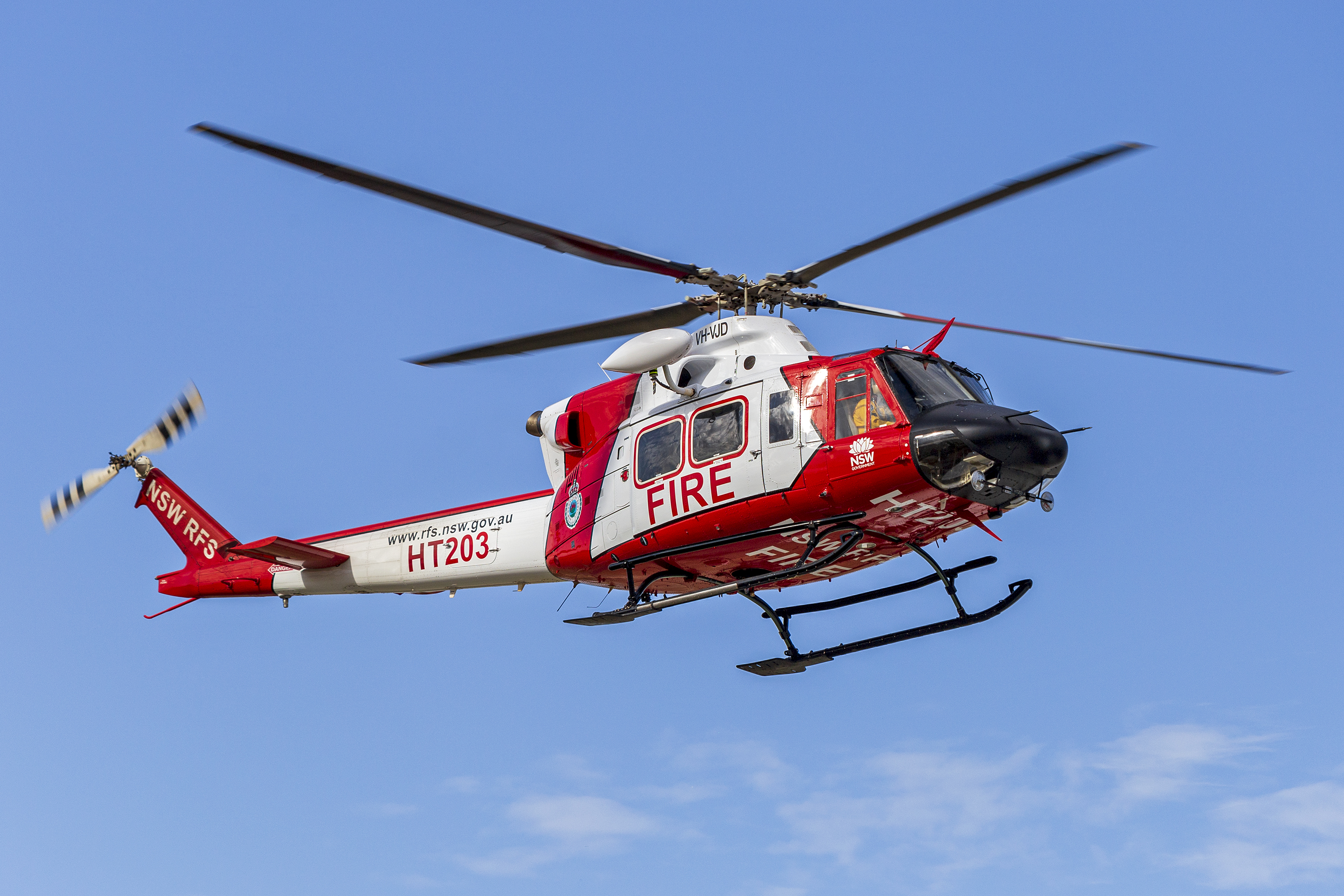
New South Wales Bell 412EP at Wagga Wagga with the Rural Fire Service

Australia
Department of Fire and Emergency Services
Emergency Management Queensland
New South Wales Police Force
New South Wales Rural Fire Service
SAAS MedSTAR Retrieval Service
Brazil
Federal Police
Canada
Canadian Coast Guard
National Research Council
Surete du Quebec
Colombia
National Police of Colombia
Croatia
Croatian Ministry of Interior

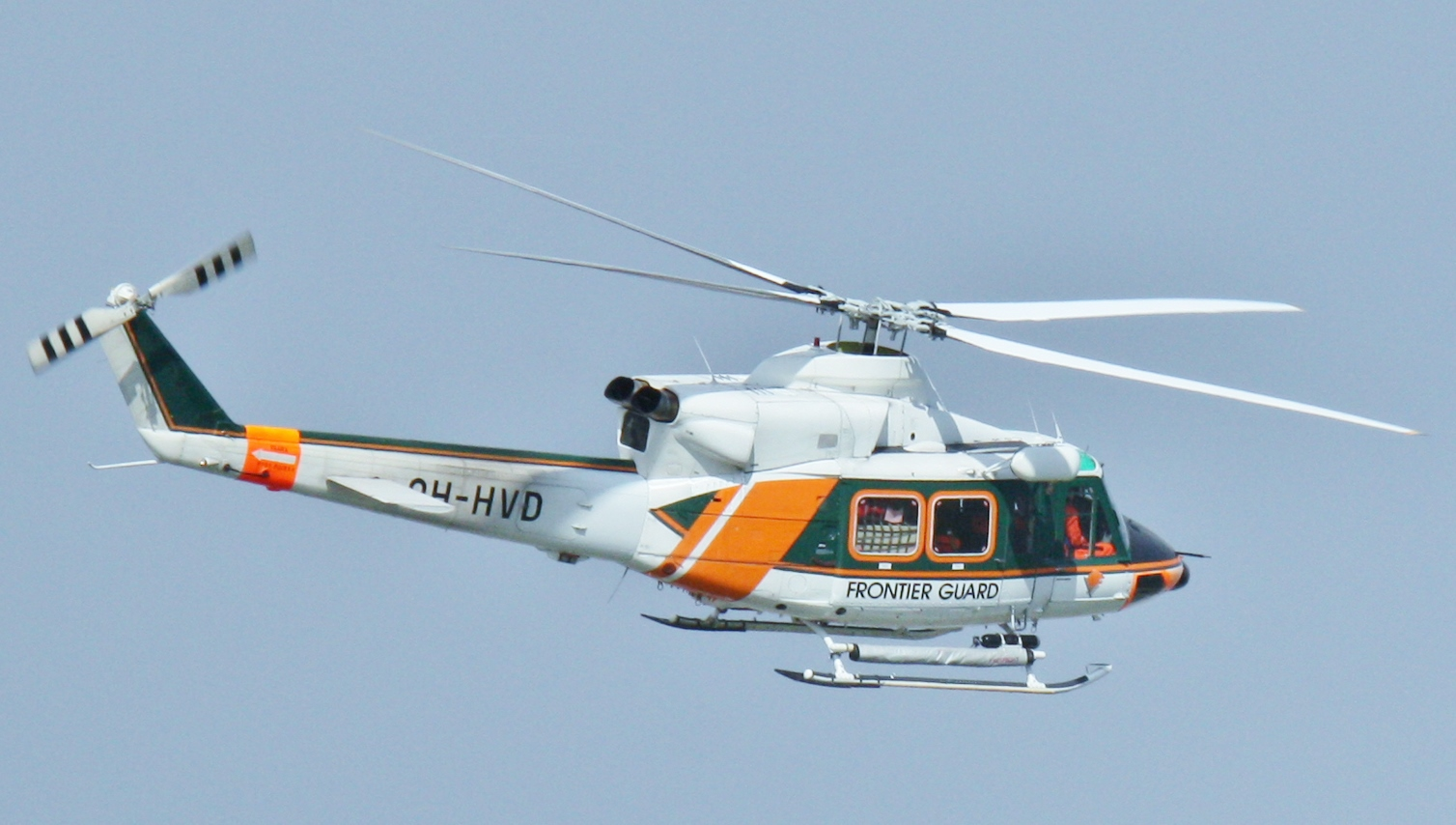
A Finnish Border Guard Agusta Bell AB-412

Czech Republic
Police of the Czech Republic
Finland
Finnish Border Guard
India
Government of Uttar Pradesh: Operates two Bell 412EP.
Indonesia
Indonesian National Police
Iran
Iranian Red Crescent Society

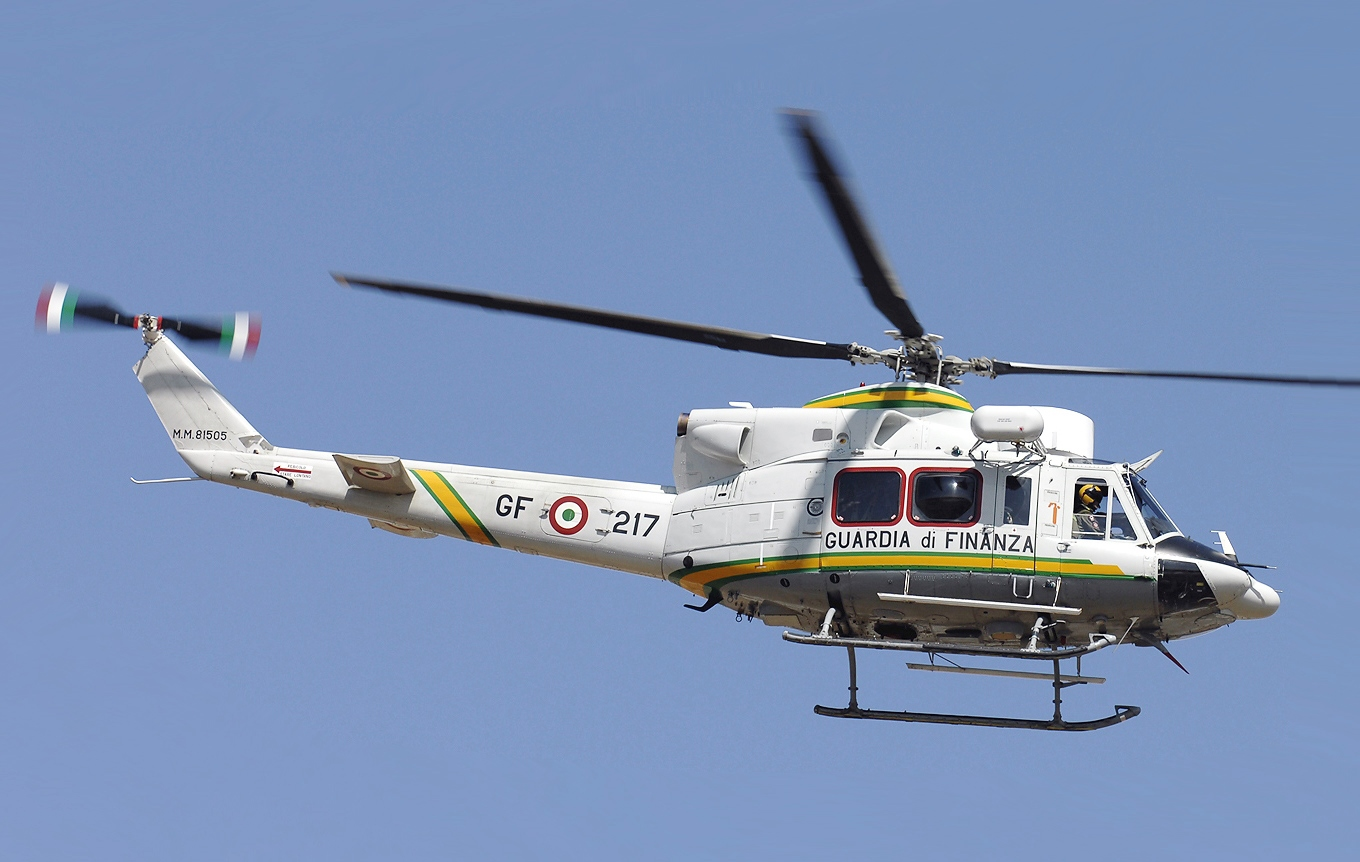
An Italian Guardia di Finanza Agusta Bell AB-412

Italy
Guardia di Finanza
State Forestry Corps
Japan
Japan Coast Guard
Tokyo Metropolitan Police

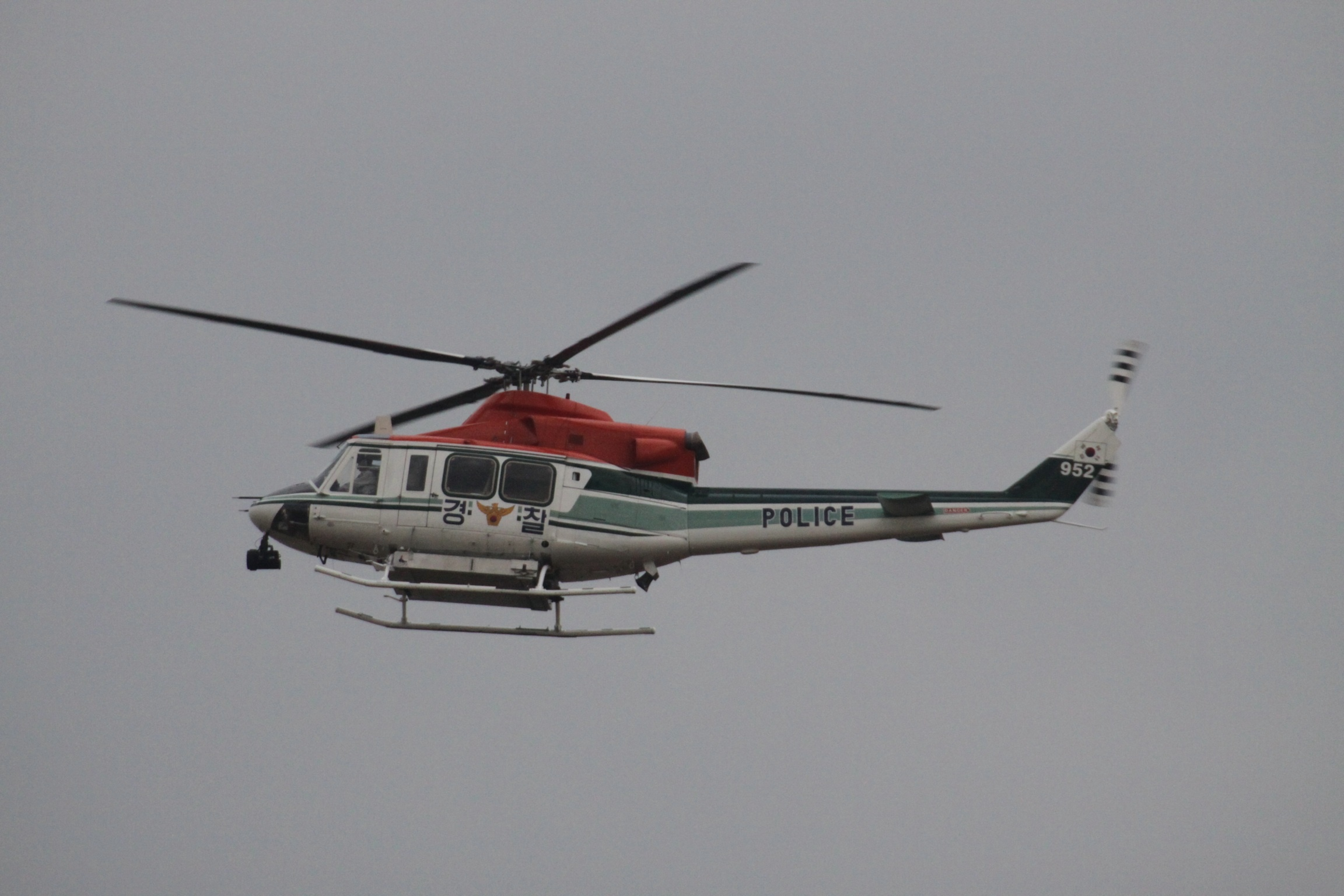
South Korean National Police Bell 412

South Korea
Coast Guard
United States
Chicago Fire Department
Delaware State Police
Los Angeles Police Department
Los Angeles County Fire Department
Miami-Dade County Fire Department
New York Police Department
Orange County Fire Authority
San Diego Fire Department
United States Park Police
Ventura County Fire Department
Virginia State Police
Kern County Fire Department

=== Former ===
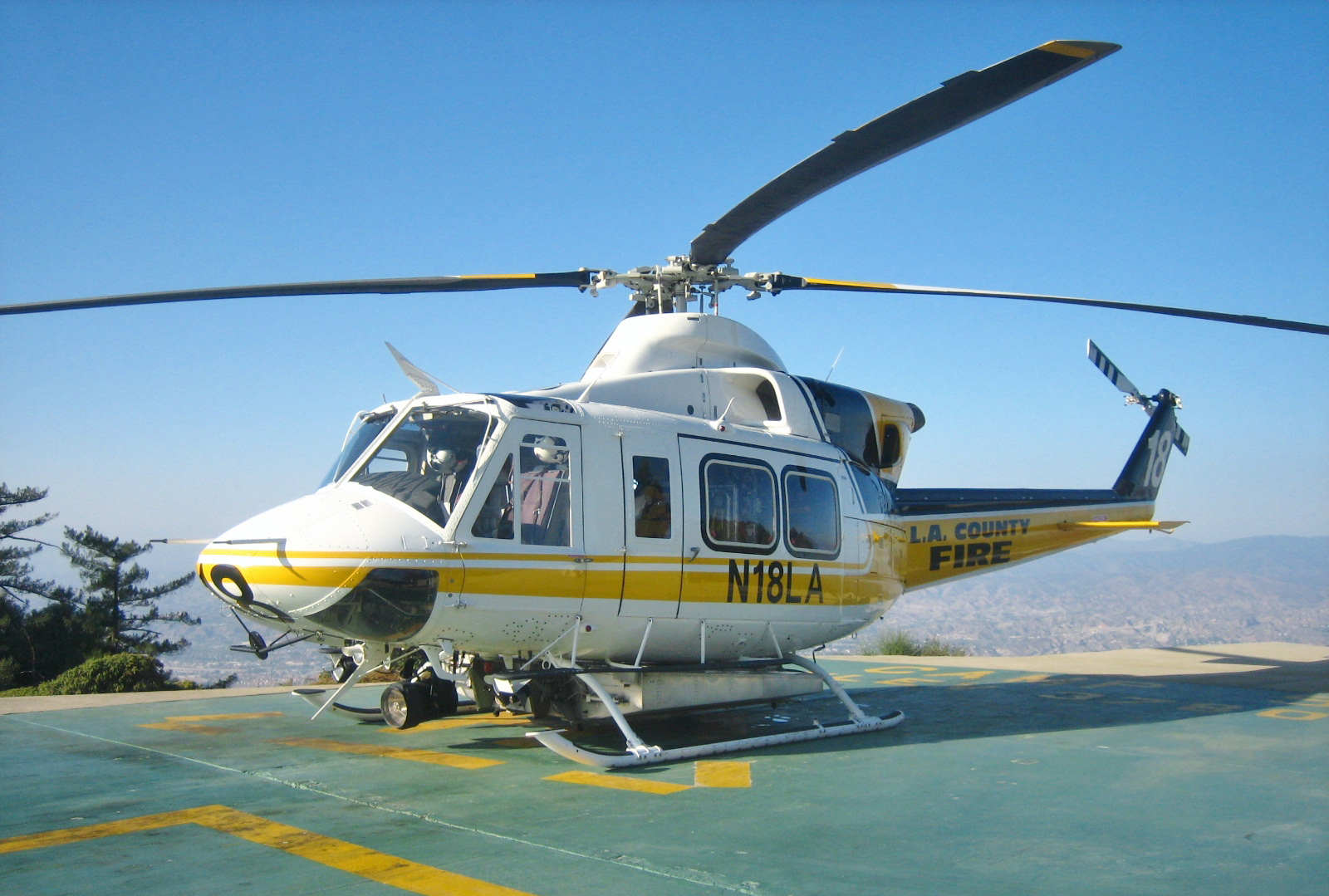
An LA County Fire Dept. 412 sits atop a helipad in the mountains in the Angeles National Forest.

Netherlands
Royal Netherlands Air Force. AB412 helicopters retired from SAR duties in 2015.
Poland
Polish Air Force, 1 412HP used 1993–2011
Slovenia
Slovenian National Police
United States
Los Angeles Fire Department
Uganda
Uganda Air Force
United Kingdom
Royal Air Force

== Incidents and accidents ==
- On April 4, 1991, a Bell 412SP collided in mid-air with a Piper Aerostar over Lower Merion Township, Pennsylvania, during an improvised attempt to inspect the Aerostar's landing gear. The accident killed all five people on both aircraft, including Aerostar passenger and United States senator John Heinz, along with two children on the ground. The collision was attributed to poor judgment by the pilots of both aircraft.
- On December 10, 2006, Bell 412SP medical helicopter Mercy Air 2 crashed in mountainous terrain near Hesperia, California. All three crew members on board died. The accident was attributed to controlled flight into terrain in low visibility.
- On December 7, 2023, a Bell 412EP operated by the Guyanese military went down carrying 2 crew and 5 senior officers at the border between Venezuela and Guyana during bad weather.
- On July 29th 2026, A Bell 412 helicopter Carrying 7 people on board operating on a firefighting flight crashed into a hillside in western Brazil. All on board were killed. The aircraft was destroyed by fire.

== Specifications (Bell 412EP) ==

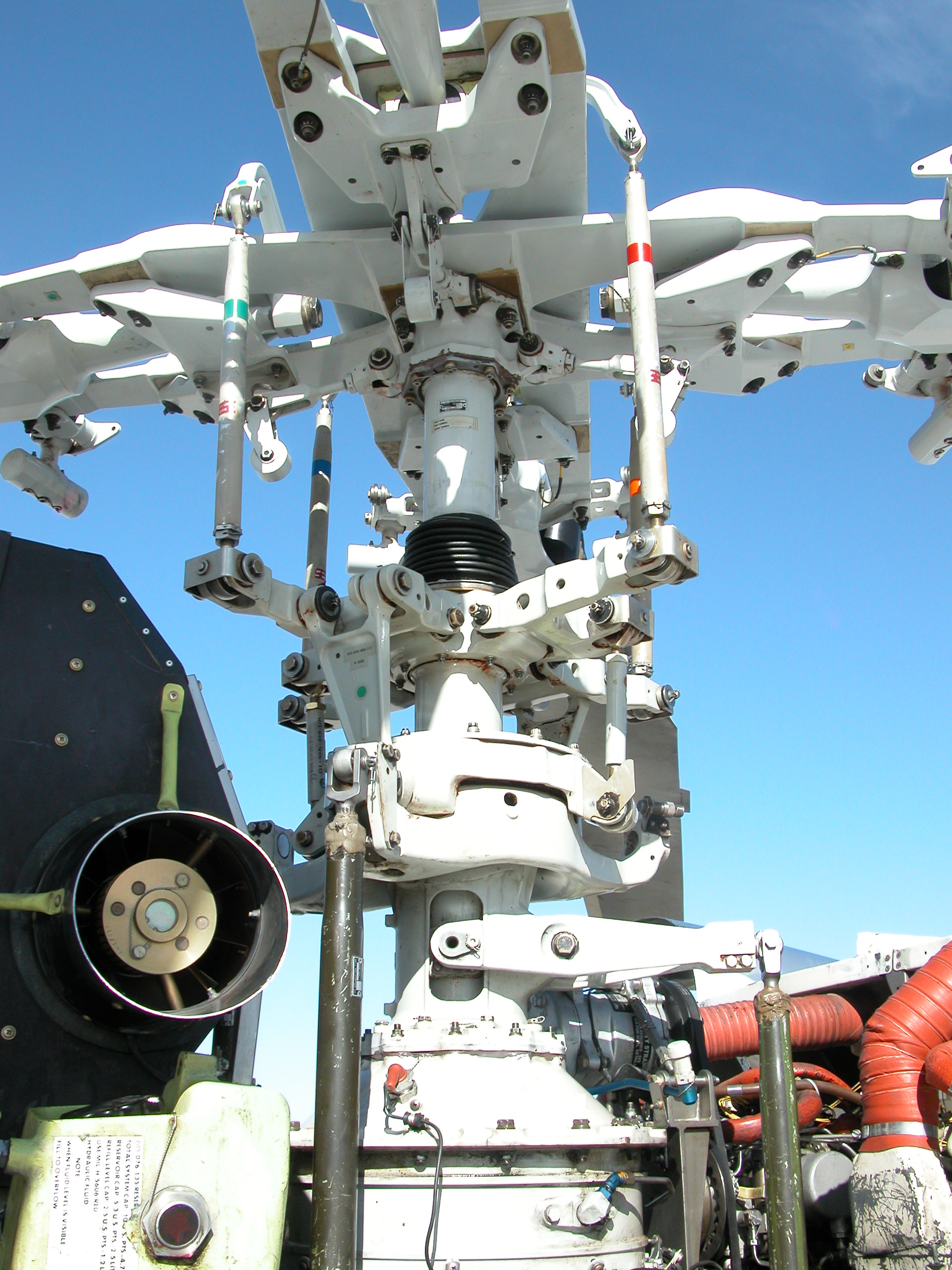
Rotor head and transmission of a Bell 412

Data from International Directory of Civil Aircraft, Bell 412EP Product Specifications

General characteristics

- Crew: one-two pilots
- Capacity: up to 13 passengers, maximum external load of almost 6,614 lb (3,000 kg)
- Length: 56 ft 1 in (17.09 m) including rotors
- Fuselage length: 43 ft (13 m)
- Height: 15 ft 0 in (4.57 m)
- Empty weight: 6,789 lb (3,079 kg)
- Max takeoff weight: 11,900 lb (5,398 kg)
- Blade sections: root: Boeing VR-7; tip: Wortmann FX 71-H-080
- Powerplant: 1 × Pratt & Whitney Canada PT6T-3D Twin-Pac or PT6T-3DF Twin-Pac coupled turboshaft engine - each, 1,250 shp (930 kW)

900 shp (671 kW) single power section emergency power

- Main rotor diameter: 46 ft 0 in (14.02 m)
- Main rotor area: 1,662 sq ft (154.4 m^{2})

Performance

- Maximum speed: 140 kn (160 mph, 260 km/h)
- Cruise speed: 122 kn (140 mph, 226 km/h)
- Range: 529 nmi (609 mi, 980 km)
- Service ceiling: 20,000 ft (6,100 m)
- Rate of climb: 1,350 ft/min (6.9 m/s)
- Power/mass: 0.2663 hp/lb (0.4378 kW/kg)

== See also ==
Related development

- Bell 212
- Bell 214
- Bell CH-146 Griffon
- Bell UH-1 Iroquois
- Bell UH-1N Twin Huey
- Bell UH-1Y Venom

Related lists

- List of civil aircraft
- List of most produced rotorcraft
