= Global Wind Organisation =

- Abbreviation: GWO
- Formation: 2009
- Type: Non-profit industry association
- Purpose: Safety training standards
- Headquarters: Copenhagen, Denmark
- Region served: Global
- Members: Wind turbine manufacturers and operators
- Key people: Jakob Lau Holst (CEO); John Barrie (Chair)
- Website: www.globalwindsafety.org

The Global Wind Organisation (GWO) is a non-profit industry association established by wind turbine manufacturers and operators to set common health and safety training standards for the wind power sector. Headquartered in Copenhagen, Denmark, the organisation oversees a framework that allows training credentials to be mutually recognised by employers across the global wind energy supply chain.

== History ==
Prior to the GWO's formation, safety training in the wind industry was fragmented. Individual manufacturers (OEMs) and site operators set their own proprietary safety requirements, meaning technicians often had to retrain in identical skills when changing employers or moving to different projects.

In 2009, a group of major wind industry companies—including Vestas, Siemens Wind Power (now Siemens Gamesa), Ørsted (then DONG Energy), Vattenfall, and Enercon—formed the GWO to harmonise these requirements. At an inaugural meeting in Esbjerg, Denmark, the founding members agreed to mutually recognise safety training that met a unified standard. In 2013, the organisation established its official secretariat in Copenhagen, initially sharing a base with the Danish Wind Industry Association.

The organisation released its first standard, Basic Safety Training (BST), in 2012, followed by a Basic Technical Training (BTT) standard in 2017. In October 2016, the GWO launched the Wind Industry Database (WINDA), a digital platform used to verify the certification status of technicians.

== Organisation and governance ==
The GWO is governed by a General Assembly of member companies, which elects a Board of directors to oversee strategy. Operational management is handled by a Copenhagen-based Secretariat led by a Chief Executive Officer.

The development of standards is delegated to committees composed of representatives from member companies:

- Training Committee: Manages the learning objectives and technical content of the training standards.
- Audit & Compliance Committee: Oversees the certification and auditing process for independent training providers.
- Regional Committees: Groups such as the North America Committee align GWO standards with local health and safety regulations (e.g., OSHA in the US).

== Training standards ==
GWO standards are modular and designed for specific technical and safety requirements in the wind industry. The GWO does not conduct training directly; it audits and accredits independent commercial and public training providers to deliver the courses.

=== Basic Safety Training (BST) ===
The BST is the primary safety certification for wind turbine technicians. It consists of five modules that must be refreshed every two years: First Aid, Manual Handling, Fire Awareness, Working at Heights, and Sea Survival (which is specific to offshore wind).

=== Basic Technical Training (BTT) ===
Introduced in 2017, the BTT covers the foundational mechanics, electrical systems, and hydraulics of wind turbines, alongside bolt tightening and installation. Unlike the safety modules, BTT certification does not expire.

=== Specialised standards ===
The GWO publishes standards for specific roles and higher-risk environments. These include Advanced Rescue Training (ART) for extracting personnel from confined spaces like turbine hubs and blades; Enhanced First Aid (EFA) for remote locations; Control of Hazardous Energies (CoHE) for Lockout-tagout procedures; and Blade Repair for work on composite materials. The GWO has also collaborated with trade associations like RenewableUK to create transition programmes for workers moving from the oil and gas sector into offshore wind.

== WINDA database ==
The Wind Industry Database (WINDA) is a digital registry where accredited training providers upload course completion records. Employers use the database to verify the qualifications of technicians before they access wind farm sites. Each technician is assigned a unique ID, which functions as a transferable training record between different employers.

== Training delivery and infrastructure ==
Training infrastructure varies depending on the provider and local geography. Commercial providers often use indoor facilities with mock nacelles, and standard swimming pools for sea survival modules. Other providers utilise natural environments, such as flooded quarries or open water, for sea survival exercises. Public institutions, such as community colleges in the US, also offer GWO courses, occasionally at subsidised rates. In Australia, some institutions have constructed full-scale dedicated wind turbine towers to replicate the height of operational turbines. Mobile training units are also utilised in North America to deliver training on-site at remote wind farms.

== Global impact ==
The adoption of GWO standards is largely driven by mandates from major employers who require the certification for their staff and subcontractors. The number of individuals holding valid GWO certificates has grown as the global wind workforce expands; by the end of 2018, over 74,000 people were certified, and the figure surpassed 190,000 by 2024. The GWO regularly collaborates with the Global Wind Energy Council (GWEC) to forecast the workforce and training demands required to meet global renewable energy targets.

== See also ==
- Wind turbine technician
- Offshore wind power
- Occupational safety and health
- Renewable energy
