= Search and Rescue Training Unit =

- Unit badge
- Active: 1979 – 2016
- Disbanded: May 2016
- Country: United Kingdom
- Branch: Royal Air Force
- Type: Training unit
- Role: Helicopter search and rescue training
- Part of: RAF Strike Command; Defence Helicopter Flying School
- Home station: RAF Valley
- Motto(s): That lives may be saved
- Aircraft: Whirlwind HAR.10; Wessex HAR.2; Griffin HT1; AW139

The Search and Rescue Training Unit (SARTU) of the Royal Air Force was a training unit which operated from 1979 to 2016. It was located at RAF Valley on the Isle of Anglesey, Wales.

== History ==
=== Background ===
Training for specialist search and rescue (SAR) roles in the Royal Air Force began in November 1958 with the creation of a training flight at RAF St. Mawgan in Cornwall, which then moved to RAF Valley on the Isle of Anglesey in Wales.

Prior to this search and rescue training was undertaken on an ad-hoc basis by individual squadrons who were responsible for developing their own techniques and procedures.

=== Early years (1970s–1980s) ===
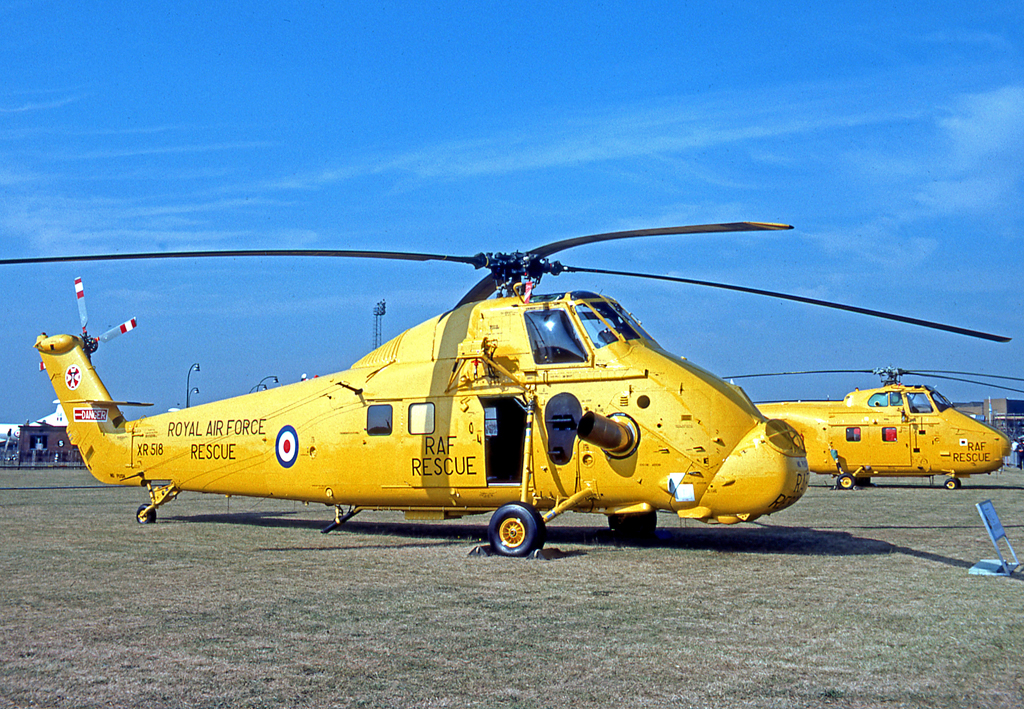
A Westland Wessex HAR.2 and in the background a Westland Whirlwind HAR.10, both types used by the Search and Rescue Training Unit

The first dedicated training of RAF search and rescue crews was undertaken in the early 1960s at RAF Valley, by No. 3 Squadron of the Central Flying School (Helicopter), a lodger from RAF Tern Hill in Shropshire. It operated the Westland Whirlwind HAR.10. In 1977 it became the Search and Rescue Training Squadron, part of No. 2 Flying Training School.

As part of the reorganisation of the search and rescue fleet, in December 1979, it became the Search and Rescue Training Unit (SARTU).

The Whirlwind was replaced with the Westland Wessex HAR.2 in 1985. The Wessex was a more capable aircraft with better performance and lifting capabilities, allowing more realistic training to be undertaken.

=== Later years (1990s–2010s) ===
SARTU became part of the newly established Defence Helicopter Flying School on 1 April 1997, transferring from RAF Strike Command. At the same time it re-equipped with the Bell Griffin HT1 and FB Heliservices (part of Cobham plc) were contracted to provide the aircraft, engineers and flight line for the unit in 1997.

The unit's fleet was expanded in April 2009 with the introduction of the AgustaWestland AW139.

The unit was re-numbered as No. 202 Squadron in May 2016, which continues to provide helicopter training for the British armed forces.

== Operations and training ==
The Search and Rescue Training Unit was based at RAF Valley on the Isle of Anglesey, Wales and is considered ideal for search and rescue training due to the nearby mountains of Snowdonia, sea cliffs of Anglesey and merchant shipping in the Irish Sea. Its mission was to "Provide all Royal Air Force helicopter aircrew with basic Search and Rescue and mountain flying skills and deliver advanced Search and Rescue training to military aircrew destined for SAR duties."

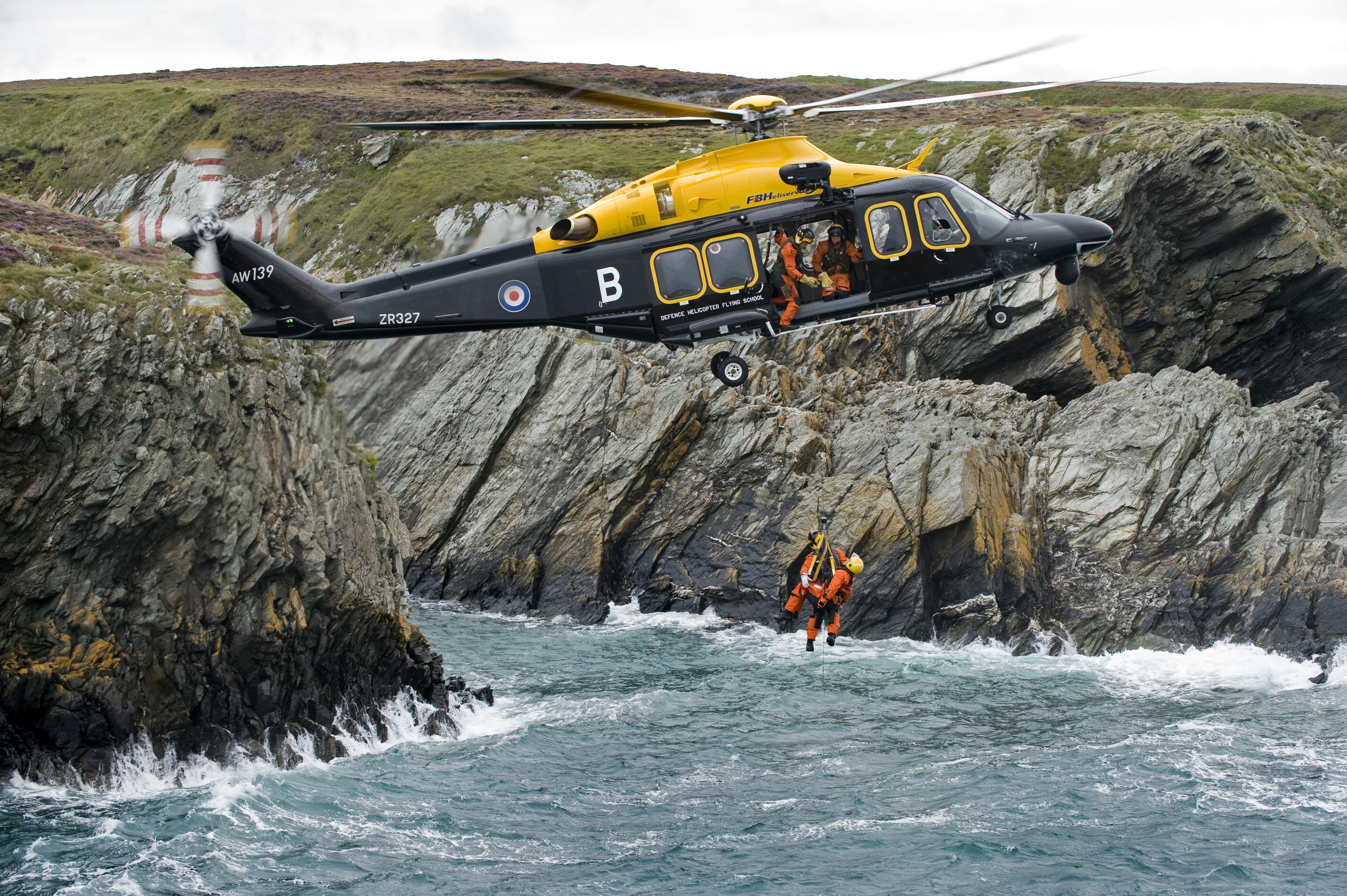
An AW139 of the Search and Rescue Training Unit, which the unit operated between 2009 and 2012.

The unit offered several training courses which taught search and rescue and mountain flying skills to both pilots and rear-crew. The unit taught personnel from both the RAF and Fleet Air Arm.

Following training, RAF crews would be posted to one of the six search and rescue flights operated by No. 22 Squadron and No. 202 Squadron around the UK, or No. 84 Squadron in Cyprus.

=== Pilot training ===
Mountain flying training started with basic techniques for safely operating in mountainous environments before progressing to valley and bowl approaches and advanced manoeuvres for use in difficult weather conditions. Courses covered basic winching; overwater hovering to rescue downed aircrew; winching from cliffs and boats and locating emergency locator beacons. More advanced training courses taught handling and crew resource management in a multi-engined helicopter; navigation; instrument flying; and mountain search and rescue.

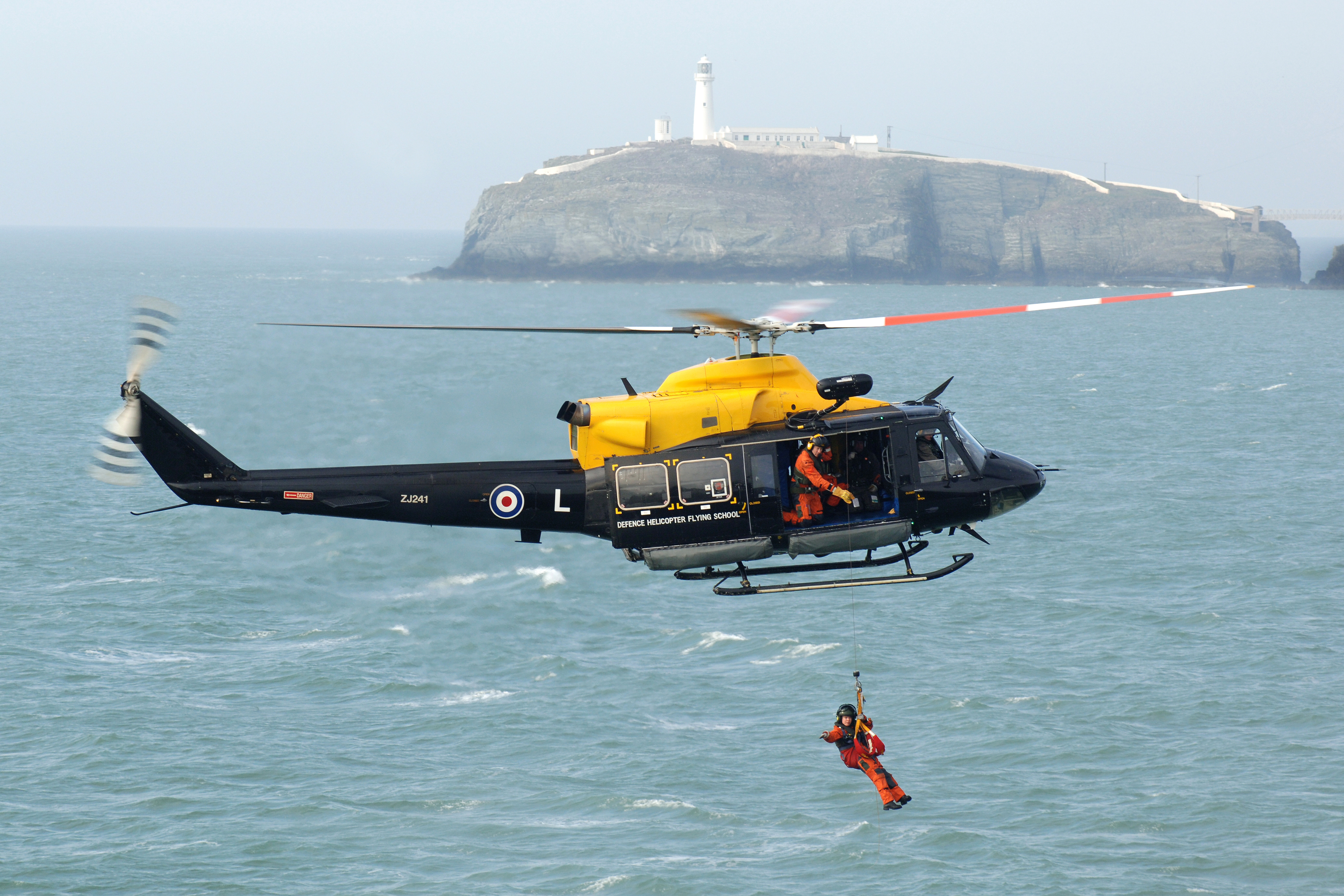
A Bell Griffin HT1 helicopter of the Search and Rescue Training Unit in 2007

=== Rear-crew training ===
The unit provided introductory training to rear-crew students in winch operator and winchman roles, both for mountain and overwater rescues. Training was also provided to crews from the UK Special Forces and the RAF's No. 84 Squadron.

=== Other training ===
The unit also ran several staff courses including a qualified helicopter crewman instructor (QHCI) course which taught experienced rear-crew how to instruct; and staff pilot conversion courses. Training courses were provided to foreign and commonwealth military and civilian personnel on behalf of Defence Helicopter Flying School.

== See also ==
- RAF Search and Rescue Force
