= Navy Divers =

- Genre: Observational Documentary
- Country of origin: Australia
- Original language: English
- No. of seasons: 1

Original release
- Network: ABC1
- Release: 28 October – 18 November 2008

Navy Divers is a four-episode Australian observational documentary series that debuted on the ABC1 on 28 October 2008. The program follows 27 men training to enter the clearance diver branch of the Royal Australian Navy, into which only 14 will be accepted.
