= Hostile Environment and Emergency First Aid Training =

Hostile Environment and Emergency First Aid Training, also known as HEFAT, is a standard type of training in first aid, given to people entering hostile environments, mostly for work, and often to journalists.

== History ==
The course was designed in 1993 by Centurion Safety of the UK. Paul Rees, a former Royal Marine, devised the course.

All BBC journalists entering hostile environments must do the HEFAT course. Other employers in difficult environments also make the course obligatory.

Other terms for HEFAT are HEAT (Hostile Environment Awareness Training) or HEST (Hostile Environment Security Training).

In 2004, the first HEAT training in the Netherlands was organised by CSD for War Child.

== Structure ==
It is often a three to six-day residential course. The course is designed for the individual's safety and health, and not as training as a paramedic. Most HEAT courses are conducted in a safe learning environment because participants may experience physical and mental stress. Another typical part of HEAT is the use of hyper-realistic simulations and a safe learning environment to keep participants safe.

=== Syllabus ===
The course includes kidnap, checkpoints, active shooters, ambushes, communication and risk assessments. For hostile environments, the first aid on the course includes amputated limbs, something many first aid courses do not commonly cover.

Other topics include

- Ballistic trauma
- Dealing with aggression
- Medical First Aid
- Carjacking
- Ambush
- Communication Security
- Hostage survival
- Improvised explosive devices (IEDs)
- Land mines
- Personal protective equipment (PPE)
- Security checkpoints
- Sexual violence
- Vehicle security

== See also ==
- List of emergency medicine courses
- Heat Transfer, Fluid Mechanics and Thermodynamics
