= RNLI College =

- Flag of the RNLI

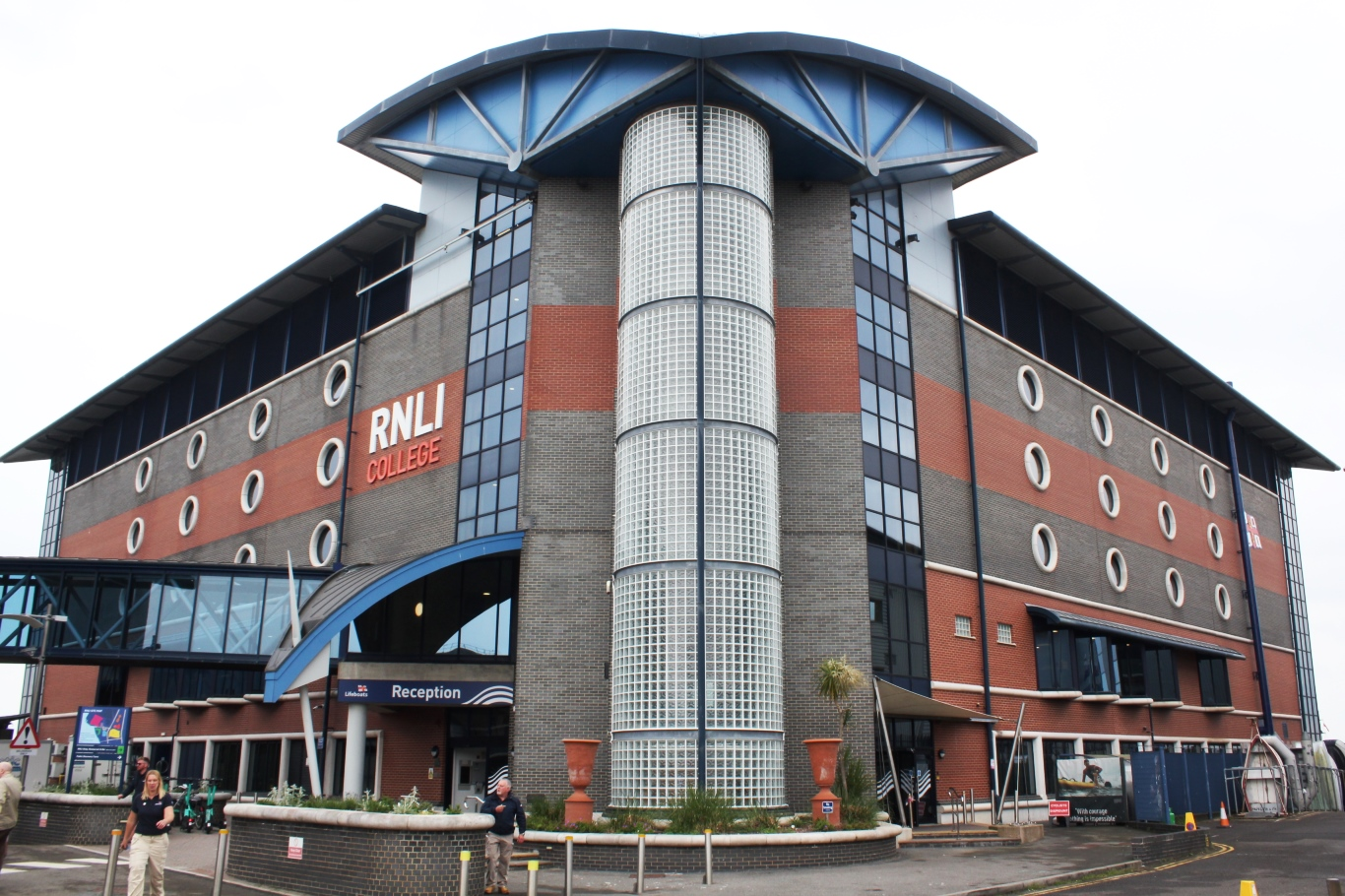

- Location within Dorset
- Former names: Lifeboat College

General information
- Type: Sea safety training facility
- Location: West Quay Road, Poole, BH15 1HZ, England
- Coordinates: 50.7174°N 1.9879°W
- Elevation: 2 m (7 ft)
- Current tenants: RNLI
- Construction started: January 2003
- Completed: 2004
- Inaugurated: 28 July 2004
- Cost: £18 million
- Client: RNLI
- Owner: RNLI

Technical details
- Floor count: 5

Design and construction
- Architecture firm: Poynton Bradbury Wynter Cole
- Main contractor: Dean and Dyball

Website
- Official website

The RNLI College (formerly known as the Lifeboat College) is the national training centre of the Royal National Lifeboat Institution (RNLI) in Poole, Dorset, England. It opened in 2004 to provide training for lifeboat crews and shore crews. In addition to training facilities, it includes hotel rooms, a restaurant and bar which are open to other organisations and the public.

== History ==
The RNLI was established in 1824. Lifeboat crews were drawn from local sailors, fishermen and coastguards who did not need to be trained in boat work, but they did need to learn to work together and sail in poor conditions. The regulations required that as the efficiency of a life-boat depends on the good training and discipline of her crew… the boat shall be taken afloat for exercise, fully manned, at least once a quarter, giving the preference to blowing weather. Lifeboat inspectors also visited each station regularly to check on the crew and their boat.

The advent of motor lifeboats in the early years of the twentieth century followed by the development of electrical equipment such as radio and radar brought a need for some technical training. Another change was the smaller number of professional sailors which saw most volunteers coming from other backgrounds and needing to be trained in boat handling and navigation. Volunteers were trained at their stations but technical training for radio and radar was done by three Mobile Training Units, caravans which could be taken around the country.

Some training was undertaken at the RNLI's headquarters which moved to Poole in 1974. It was suggested in 1996 that an international training college should be provided and so the Lifeboat College (as it was then known) was built on the quayside opposite the headquarters building. It was opened by Queen Elizabeth II on 28 July 2004. The architects were Poynton Bradbury Wynter Cole and the main contractors Dean and Dyball. It was a finalist in the national Built In Quality Awards in 2005.

== Description ==
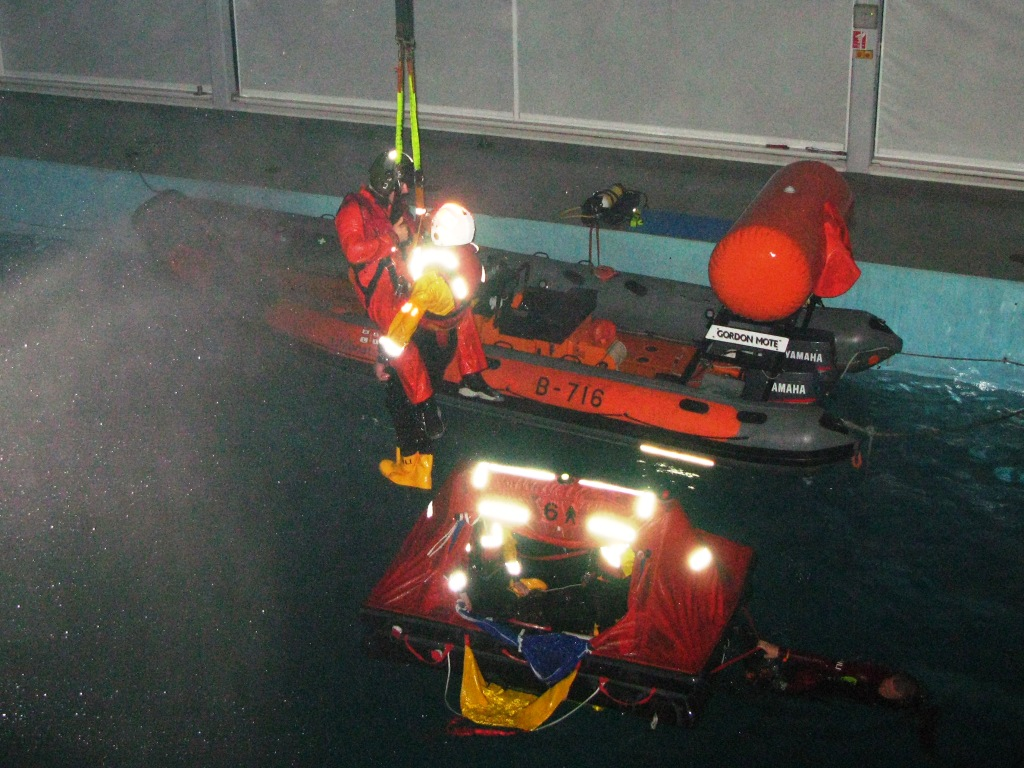
Training in the Sea Survival Centre's wave pool

The college and adjacent Lifeboat Support Centre were built by Dean and Dyball. The roof is curved to represent waves. Windows are round to mimic portholes.

The college has classrooms, engine workshops and a bridge simulator. Its Sea Survival Centre has a wave pool and can simulate 4 m (13 ft) waves, thunder, lightning, rain and gale-force winds. Crews are also trained at sea, either in a fleet of lifeboats that are kept at Poole for that purpose or in their new lifeboats before they are placed on station. The college includes 60 bedrooms, a restaurant and bar which are also open to non-RNLI visitors.

== See also ==
- Poole Lifeboat Station
- RM Poole, Royal Marine training facility
