= Helicopter Underwater Escape Training =

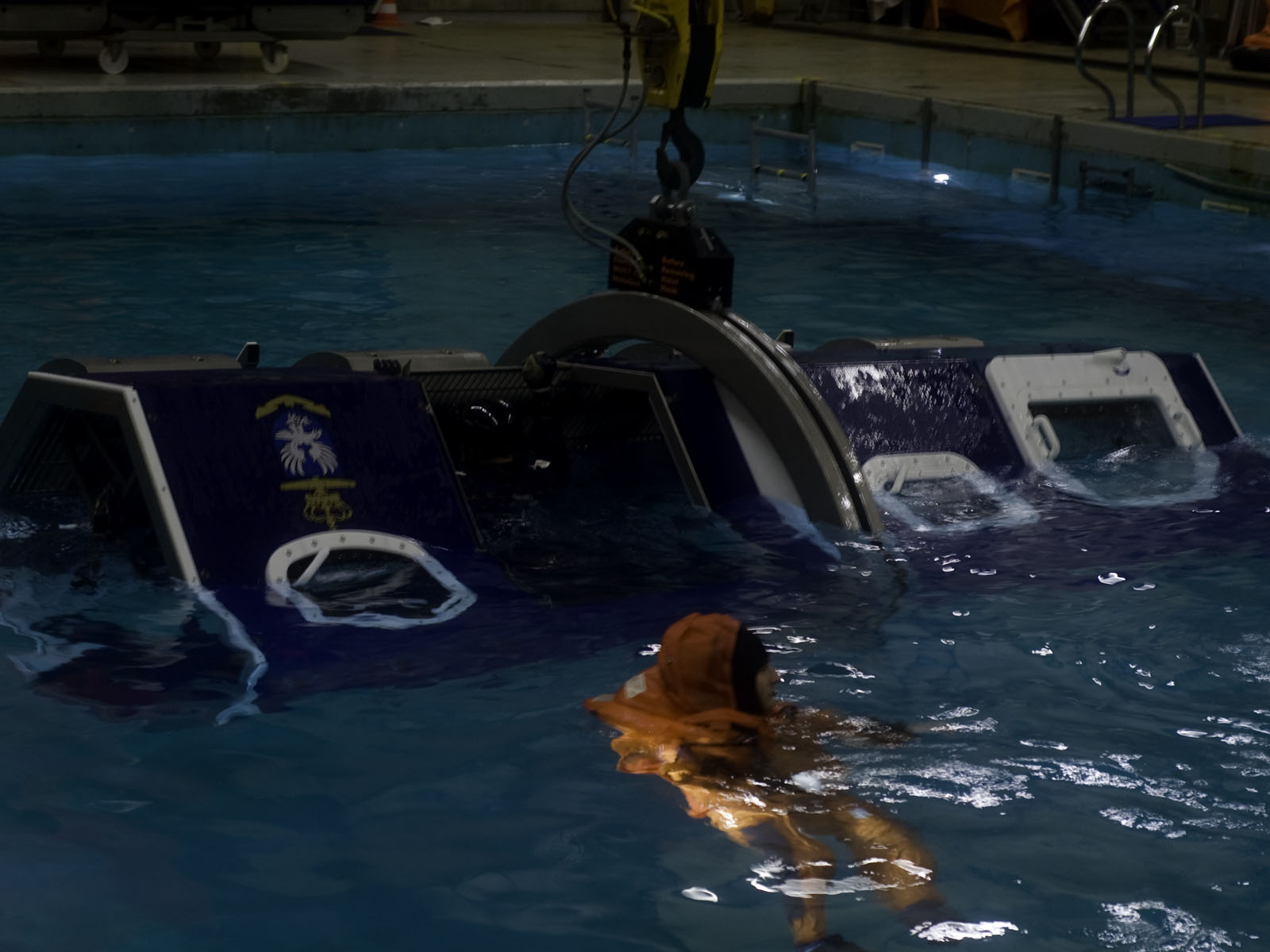
HUET simulator for Westland Lynx helicopter

Helicopter Underwater Egress Training (also known as Helicopter Underwater Escape Training, and Rotary-wing Underwater Egress Training in Canada; often abbreviated as HUET (Note: Pronounced hue-wet, hue-way or you-way) (RUET) is training provided to helicopter flight crews, offshore oil and gas industry, law enforcement personnel, and military personnel who are regularly transported by helicopters over water. As the name implies, the purpose of this training is to prepare passengers and crew for an emergency evacuation or egress in the event of a crash landing on water.

== Overview ==
Typical HUET programs involve both a theoretical and practical component. The theoretical component provides personnel with information related to previous ditching events, the hazards of helicopter operations (e.g., main and tail rotors, engine exhausts, and external antenna locations), the available safety equipment carried on board the helicopter (external floatation devices, emergency egress lighting, crash attenuating seats) as well as personal protective equipment (PPE), and the procedures needed to safely operate the equipment. This theoretical component specifically outlines the three phases of a ditching (pre-impact, post-impact, and rescue) to ensure that individuals can complete tasks that will improve survivability. The practical component of the training provides the opportunity for individuals to physically complete the skills known to be important during underwater egress.

== Theoretical component ==
=== Pre-impact ===
Pre-impact tasks include aspects of being physically and mentally prepared for the flight (e.g., adequate sleep, proper hydration and caloric intake, and dressing appropriately for the expected environmental conditions). The program identifies immediate actions (e.g., securing losses articles within close proximity, tightening of seat restrains including stowage of excess material, identification of primary and secondary exits, and brace positions) to be taken in the event of an in-flight emergency that requires the pilots to make a ditching. Priority is placed on the development of an appropriate brace position, as reports have identified that drowning is the most prevalent cause of death during a ditching; however, the pre-impact phase includes the preparation prior to arrival at a heliport and ends the moment that the helicopter touches the surface of the water. Pre-flight videos at the heliport are typically used to reenforce the information provided in the theoretical component of HUET programs.

=== Post-impact ===
Post-impact training addresses the steps need to evacuate from an upright fuselage into the water or a life raft as well as those needed to egress from an inverted and flooded cabin. This post-impact theory typically includes clear instructions about when and how the evacuation/egress should occur. For example, evacuation into a life raft should be directed by the aircrew as long as they are capable of doing so. Egressing from a capsized and flooded cabin should occur after the initial ingress of water has begun to subside. Seat restrains should remain on during the inversion period and should only be removed once a clear egress path has been established. Seat restraints aid in the ability to remain oriented in relation to the fuselage and to apply force on an emergency exit. Once an exit has been removed, a hand should be placed on the open window/door edge to ensure that when the seat restrain is released, there is a physical reference point directly to the outside of the fuselage. If an emergency breath system (EBS) has been provided as part of the PPE, it should be used in any situation where immediate underwater egress is not available (e.g., impact injury, blocked exit, aisle seat, or multiple passengers using one exit) or egress will take longer than an individual's breath-hold capabilities.

=== Rescue ===
The rescue phase of a ditching includes information related to in-water or in-life raft survival as well as a discussion regarding the various search and rescue (SAR) resources/procedures available in the local region. This portion of the theoretical information also provides guidance concerning signalling for help, completing first-aid, and being hoisted from the water/life raft. In-water survival instruction most often covers aspects of PPE such as life jackets, immersion suits, and signalling devices as well as the effects of hypothermia.

== Practical component ==
=== Training environment ===
The practical training component includes the opportunity to use the personal protective equipment discussed in the theoretical component as well as complete underwater egress skills from an underwater egress simulator (UES). The UES varies across each training centre, as does the level of physical fidelity, the required number of egress trials and the period of certification. The most common UES systems rotate around single axis, usually lengthwise; however, some designs can turn 360° in both the horizontal and vertical planes. The underwater egress practical component is designed to simulate real-world environmental conditions by completely inverting 180˚ (or in some cases slightly off angle to simulate that the external floatation devices have failed on one side of the helicopter) and flooding the UES in a pool. Some training centres also include environmental elements such as wind, rain, sound, and simulated lightning depending on the training program.

=== HUET performance assessment ===
Assessment of egress performance focuses on students completing and maintaining a brace position, identifying, functioning, and using primary and secondary exit points, egressing through the exit without kicking, surfacing outside the UES, and performing post-egress survival skills such as inflating a life jacket or life raft, completing a head count to ensure that everyone has successfully egressed. Depending on the jurisdictional requirements in which the HUET program is completed, there may or may not be a requirement to open a simulated emergency exit while underwater. The HUET training aims to develop awareness of what, how, and when specific skills need to be implemented to increase the chances of survival during a ditching.

== See also ==
- Index of aviation articles
- Dilbert Dunker
