= 2010–2011 Queensland Flood and Cyclone Citation =

Queensland state honour

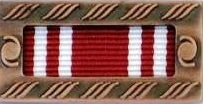
- The 2010–2011 Queensland Flood and Cyclone Citation
- Type: Citation
- Awarded for: Performed duty on at least one shift at any time between 1 December 2010 and 28 February 2011. Duty performed may be in direct response to the flood and cyclone events or maintaining core business during this period.
- Presented by: the Queen in Right of Queensland
- Eligibility: Employees and volunteers of the Queensland Police Service, Department of Community Safety, and Queensland Ambulance Service.
- Campaigns: Cyclone Tasha; 2010–11 Queensland floods Cyclone Yasi
- Status: Ceased, Those who qualify can still apply.
- Established: 2011
- First award: 4 June 2011

Precedence
- Next (higher): QPS 150 Citation
- Next (lower): G20 Citation
- Related: National Emergency Medal with 'QLD 2010–11' clasp

The 2010–2011 Queensland Flood and Cyclone Citation is a Queensland honour established by the Governor-of-Queensland-in-Council in 2011.

== Description ==
The citation consists of a maroon ribbon with four white vertical stripes surrounded by a bronze metallic frame. The four white stripes represent the four emergency service agencies that existed at the time of the event - Queensland Fire and Rescue Service, Queensland Ambulance Service, Emergency Management Queensland and the Queensland Police Service.

The cyclone symbols on both sides of the citation represents the time line of cyclonic events occurring between Cyclone Tasha in December 2010 and Cyclone Yasi in February 2011. The swirls on the top and bottom of the citation represents waves associated with the mass flooding which occurred throughout many parts of Queensland.

== Eligibility ==
The group citation was issued to employees and volunteers of the Department of Community Safety who performed duty on at least one shift at any time between 1 December 2010 and 28 February 2011. Duty performed may be in direct response to the flood and cyclone events or in maintaining core business during this period.

Members of the following agencies were awarded the citation:

- Queensland
  - Emergency Management Queensland
  - Queensland Ambulance Service
  - Queensland Fire and Rescue Service
  - Queensland Police Service
  - St John Ambulance Australia
  - Queensland State Emergency Service
  - Surf Life Saving Queensland
- Australian Capital Territory
  - ACT State Emergency Service
- New South Wales
  - Ambulance Service of NSW
  - NSW Fire Brigades
  - NSW Police Force
  - NSW State Emergency Service
- South Australia
  - SA Police
  - SA State Emergency Service
- Tasmania
  - Tasmania State Emergency Service
- Victoria
  - Victoria Police
  - Victoria State Emergency Service
- Western Australia
  - WA State Emergency Service
- Northern Territory
  - Northern Territory Fire and Rescue Service
  - Northern Territory Emergency Service
- National
  - Australian Federal Police
  - Australian Volunteer Coast Guard
  - St John Ambulance Australia

== See also ==
- Queensland Honours
- Australian Honours System
- National Emergency Medal with 'QLD 2010–11' clasp
