= Department of Community Safety =

Queensland state government department

Department overview
- Formed: 2009
- Preceding agencies: Department of Emergency Services; Department of Corrective Services
- Dissolved: 2013
- Jurisdiction: Queensland
- Headquarters: Kedron, Brisbane
- Minister responsible: Jack Dempsey, Minister for Police and Community Safety

The Department of Community Safety was a Queensland Government department established in March 2009 and dissolved in 2015. The department formed from a merger of the former Department of Emergency Services and the Department of Corrective Services. It was headquartered at Kedron in Brisbane.

It consisted of the Queensland Fire and Rescue Service, Emergency Management Queensland, the Queensland Corrective Services, and the Queensland Ambulance Service.

== Functions ==
The Department of Community Safety was responsible for providing front line services in law enforcement, emergency services, and other community safety services.

== Dissolution ==
On the 1 November 2013, the Department of Community Safety was renamed the Public Safety Business Agency and had various functions transferred to other departments and agencies. The Queensland Fire and Rescue Service and Emergency Management Queensland were merged to become the Queensland Fire and Emergency Services. Disaster resilience and recovery programs were transferred to the Department of Local Government, Community Recovery and Resilience. Queensland Corrective Services was assigned to the Department of Justice and Attorney-General.

== Awards ==
The Department of Community Safety along with the Queensland Police Service established the 2010–2011 Queensland Flood and Cyclone Citation.

== See also ==
- Emergency medical services in Australia
- Paramedics in Australia
