= Wieambilla shootings =

2022 murders in Queensland, Australia

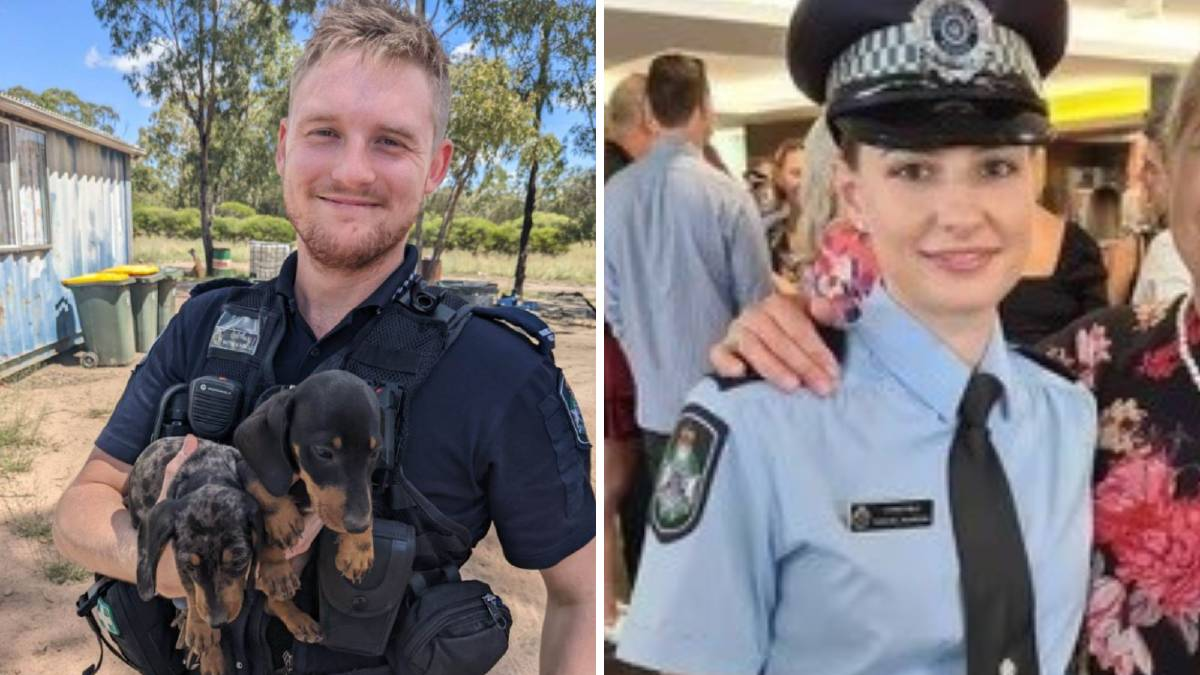
- Constable Matthew Arnold and Constable Rachel McCrow, the officers killed in the shootings

- Wieambilla (Queensland) Wieambilla (Australia)
- Location: 251 Wains Road, Wieambilla, Queensland, Australia
- Date: 12 December 2022; 3 years ago 4:37 p.m. – 10:39 p.m. (AEST, UTC+10:00)
- Target: Queensland Police officers
- Attack type: Ambush; mass shooting; shootout; triple-murder; arson
- Weapons: Used by the Train family: .30-06 Springfield Tikka T3 rifle; .308 Winchester Ruger M77 rifle; 6.5×55mm Swedish Mauser; .22 LR CZ 452-2E ZKM rifle; One police-issue .40 Glock handgun (taken from an officer)
- Deaths: 6 (2 police officers, a neighbour and 3 perpetrators)
- Injuries: 1 (police officer)
- Victims: Constable Matthew Arnold; Constable Rachel McCrow; Alan Dare
- Perpetrators: Nathaniel Train; Gareth Train; Stacey Train
- Motive: Christian fundamentalism
- Coroner: Terry Ryan

The Wieambilla shootings occurred on 12 December 2022 with the killings of two Queensland Police constables, Matthew Arnold and Rachel McCrow, and civilian Alan Dare, at a rural property in Wieambilla, Queensland, Australia. The property's three residents, brothers Gareth and Nathaniel Train, and Gareth's wife, Stacey Train, were subsequently shot and killed by police following an hours-long standoff. The police described the shootings as a Christian fundamentalist terror attack, although a subsequent coronial inquest found that the attack did not meet the statutory definition of a terror act and attributed the Trains' actions to a shared psychosis rooted in their religious beliefs and persecutory delusions.

== Background ==
New South Wales Police asked Queensland Police to conduct a check at the property of Gareth Train and his wife Stacey in Wieambilla, a rural locality 270 kilometres (170 mi) northwest of Brisbane, as part of an ongoing missing person case. New South Wales police reported that Gareth's brother Nathaniel Train, the former principal of Walgett Community College Primary School and Yorkeys Knob State School, had not made contact since 9 October, and police were sent to conduct a welfare check as well as to follow up a warrant related to a December 2021 weapons dumping and a state border breach. Nathaniel's estranged second wife, who had lodged the missing person report on 4 December, had subsequently been inundated with threatening and vicious messages from Gareth.

Gareth Train was a known online conspiracy theorist who actively participated in Australian conspiracy theory forums and websites, where he espoused strong anti-government, anti-police, and anti-vaccine views, and supported the sovereign citizen movement. He had also claimed that the Port Arthur massacre was a false flag operation which intended to disarm the Australian population, and that Princess Diana was killed in a "blood sacrifice". The father of Gareth and Nathaniel, pastor Ronald Train, said in an interview on A Current Affair that "Gareth in particular was obsessed with guns and weapons, Nathaniel to a lesser degree". He also said that Gareth was a difficult child who was "very volatile [and] very controlling".

Both Nathaniel and Gareth had a dislike for police. Nathaniel was previously married to Stacey. They were both former teachers, having resigned in 2020 and 2021 respectively.

== Incident ==
=== Killings ===
On the afternoon of 12 December 2022, police Constables Matthew Arnold and Rachel McCrow from nearby Tara, and Constables Randall Kirk and Keely Brough from Chinchilla drove in separate police vehicles to the property located at Wieambilla, a rural locality 270 kilometres (170 mi) northwest of the state capital, Brisbane. The four Constables met at the locked entrance to the property at about 4:35 p.m., and after receiving no response following the honking of a horn in one of the police vehicles, they jumped the fence walking up the dirt driveway towards the residence. The Constables were wearing body-worn cameras, which captured the subsequent shooting.

At 4:37 p.m., without warning, the residents of the property, armed with a .308 Winchester Ruger M77 rifle and a .30-06 Springfield Tikka T3 rifle, shot at the police officers in what was described as an ambush and an execution. Nathaniel Train fired a single gunshot at Constable Arnold when he was 120 metres (390 ft) from the front gate, fatally wounding him in the chest. Constable McCrow dropped to the ground and attempted to call for help on her police radio, but was shot in the back and legs. The other two constables crawled to cover in nearby bushland at separate locations. At 4:42 p.m., two constables from Dalby heard an urgent police radio broadcast that shots had been fired with an officer down and started heading towards Wieambilla.

A wounded McCrow recorded a final message for her family on her body-worn camera before emptying her police-issue Glock pistol at Gareth Train. McCrow pleaded for her life before Gareth fatally shot her at close range at 4:46 p.m. Both constables Arnold and McCrow had their Glock pistols taken from them by the perpetrators.

After McCrow was killed, constable Kirk fired a single shot from his pistol at Gareth, but missed. Gareth began searching for Kirk who, after speaking to his supervisor on a mobile phone call, decided to flee to his police vehicle located 100 metres (330 ft) away at the front gate. Despite being shot in the hip as he ran, Kirk was able to reach his vehicle and drove away.

The perpetrators then lit a grass fire to try to locate Brough, who remained undiscovered. They also set Arnold and McCrow's police vehicle on fire. Constable Brough called Triple Zero on her mobile phone at 4:44 p.m., and remained on the call as she hid in grass. She often had to whisper to the police operator because Nathaniel and Gareth were so close to her, and told the operator that she thought she was going to die. At 5:20 p.m., the two Dalby constables arrived near the Trains' property and were joined by another police constable from Tara, who also responded to the police radio broadcast.

At about 5:30 p.m., a neighbour, Alan Dare, was fatally shot in the back after going to the property to investigate the fires. Dare and another neighbour, Victor Lewis, saw smoke and heard gunfire coming from the Trains' property, prompting them to investigate. Prior to this, Dare's wife Kerry had called Triple Zero twice at 5:13 and 5:17 p.m., during which the operator advised against investigating the fire but failed to inform her before her husband and Lewis left that two police officers had been shot. Dare was recording a video on his mobile phone when he was killed by one of the perpetrators. Lewis, who was unharmed, fled after Dare was shot and came across the three responding police constables, telling them: "I think my mate's been shot." He later informed Kerry that her husband "was in a bad way".

=== Standoff ===
Sixteen local general duties officers responded, who decided not to wait for tactical officers from the Special Emergency Response Team (SERT) to arrive. They extracted the bodies of constables Arnold and McCrow using Dare's Ford Territory SUV whilst coming under fire, and at about 6:34 p.m., extracted constable Brough, who ran to the front gate after hearing the code words "pink and blue" called out by the officers, that had been earlier given to her by the Triple Zero operator. At 7:00 p.m., Gareth began shooting intermittently at a police helicopter for 15 minutes.

At about 7:31 p.m., Gareth and Stacey were seen sitting at a table outside their house, while Nathaniel was lying beside them near a log barricade. During this time, the couple recorded a video and posted it on YouTube under their middle names, Daniel and Jane, and also posted it on an online conspiracy site. In the video, Gareth said "they came to kill us and we killed them", referring to the police as "devils and demons". At about 7:40 p.m., SERT officers arrived with their armoured vehicle, a BearCat, and three light armoured vehicles, and surrounded the property. Police negotiators attempted unsuccessfully to negotiate with the perpetrators using the BearCat's loud hailer.

The BearCat was driven up the driveway towards the house, but retreated after Gareth and Nathaniel fired at it, including at its windscreen close to the driver. Gareth continued to fire in the BearCat's direction for several minutes until 10:04 p.m., after which he retreated to the water tank next to the house and fired at a police helicopter. Nathaniel was still lying near the log barricade, while Stacey had re-entered the house. At 10:05 p.m., the BearCat was driven towards the house again but retreated after Nathaniel fired at it.

At 10:29 p.m., SERT officers breached the property in the BearCat with assistance from two police helicopters that provided observations on the locations and movements of the perpetrators. By 10:39 p.m., SERT officers had fatally shot all of the perpetrators. Gareth was the first killed as he attempted to reload his weapon, followed by Stacey after she reemerged from the house and fired a single shot at police using her rifle, and then Nathaniel after he fired at the BearCat using constable Arnold's Glock pistol.

== Victims ==
Constable Matthew Arnold was aged 26, constable Rachel McCrow was aged 29, and Alan Dare was aged 58. The two constables who survived, Randall Kirk and Keely Brough, were both aged 28 at the time of the shooting; both were taken to hospital, and Kirk underwent surgery to remove shrapnel and treat his injuries. Arnold had been sworn in as a police officer in March 2020 and McCrow in June 2021.

McCrow and Arnold were awarded the National Police Service Medal, National Medal, Queensland Police Service Medal, and Queensland Police Valour Medal during their memorial service held at the Brisbane Entertainment Centre on 21 December 2022.

The Queensland Police Service announced it would be awarding Dare a posthumous Queensland Police Bravery Medal. His funeral was held on 23 December.

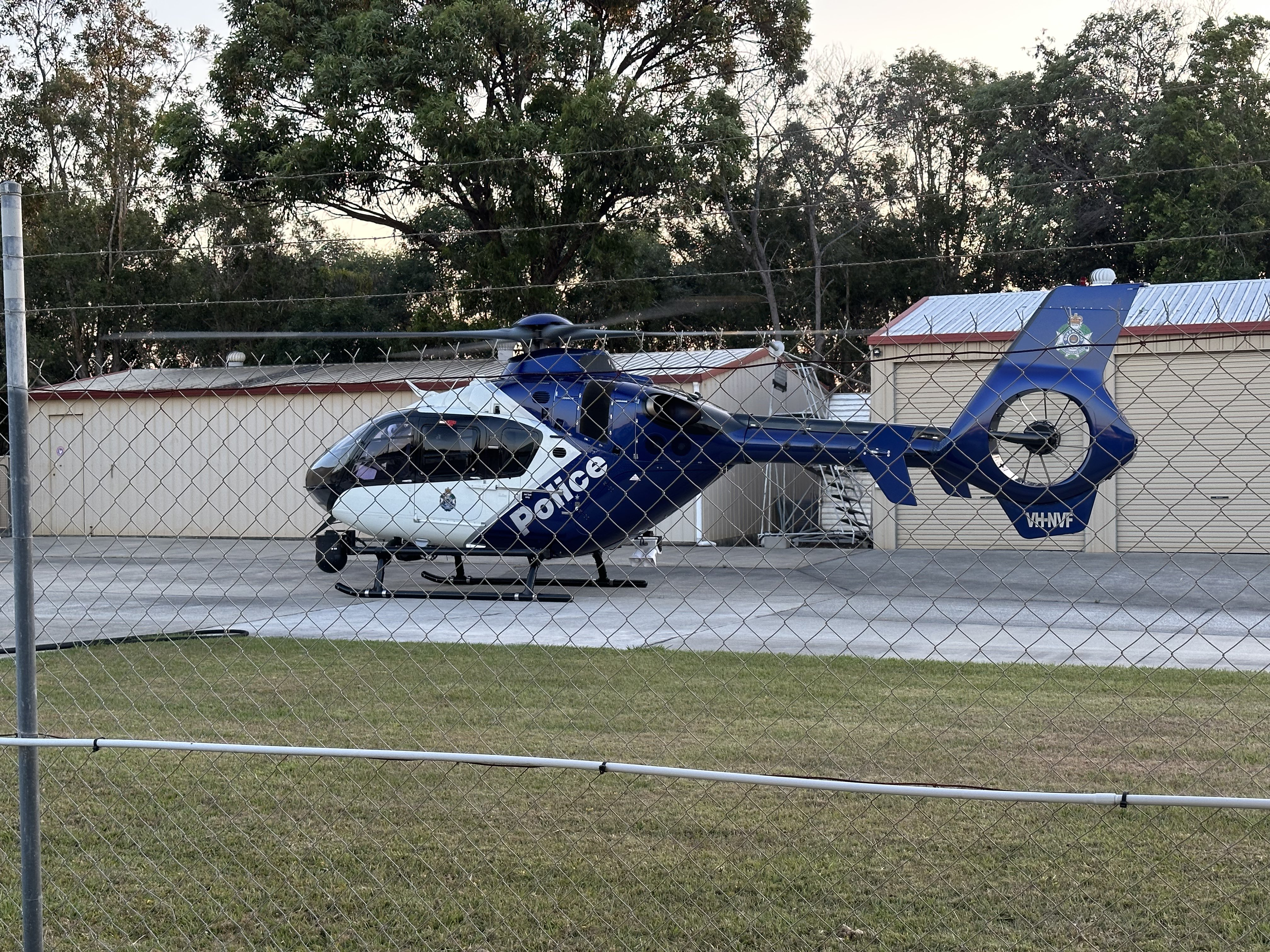
The Queensland Police Eurocopter EC135 P2+ that was utilised during the siege

== Reactions ==
Prime Minister Anthony Albanese paid tribute to the victims, labelling it a "devastating day" for the local community and for Queensland Police. Other federal party leaders, including Opposition Leader Peter Dutton, Nationals leader David Littleproud and Greens leader Adam Bandt, paid their respects. Dutton, a former Queensland police officer, became emotional during a condolence motion in parliament.

Queensland Premier Annastacia Palaszczuk announced that buildings across the state including Brisbane's Story Bridge would light up in blue and white to honour the victims and state flags would be lowered to half-mast.

New South Wales Premier Dominic Perrottet paid his respects at a police memorial and announced on 14 December that the Sydney Opera House would be lit up in blue that night in honour of the police officers.

The Australian Federal Police and the New Zealand Police sent their condolences, as did the Queensland Police Union, which subsequently announced plans to purchase the property to serve as a memorial for the fallen officers and to prevent the site from "falling into the wrong hands".

== Aftermath ==
=== Attempted looting of the Trains' property ===
On 18 December 2022, police charged two men with unlawful trespass and stealing by looting on the Trains' property.

=== Declared an act of terrorism ===
In February 2023, Queensland Police Deputy Police Commissioner Tracy Linford released details of the police's assessment of the perpetrators’ motivation. Linford said that "We [Queensland Police] don't believe this attack was random or spontaneous" and that "There is absolutely no evidence at this time that there is anyone else in Australia that participated or assisted in this attack." Linford further stated that the Trains were religious extremists who subscribed to "a broad Christian fundamentalist belief system known as premillennialism", and that the assessment had concluded that they "executed a religiously motivated terrorist attack." According to Guardian Australia, this would make the incident "Australia’s first fundamentalist Christian terrorist attack".

The coronial inquest into the shootings concluded that the shootings did not meet the definition of a terrorist act under the Commonwealth Criminal Code.

=== US citizen charged with inciting the Trains online ===
In December 2023, U.S. citizen Donald Day Jr., reported as being a conspiracy theorist, was arrested in the U.S. state of Arizona in connection with the shootings. Between May 2021 and December 2022, Day is alleged to have sent the Trains "Christian end-of-days" ideological messages. On the day of the shooting, Day is alleged to have commented on the video the Trains posted online shortly after it was posted and before the Trains were killed by police. In January 2024, American prosecutors added further charges, accusing Day of illegal possession of a firearm by a convicted felon and threatening FBI agents at the time of his arrest. Day later reached a deal with prosecutors in September 2025, agreeing to plead guilty to possessing firearms while a felon in return for the other charges being dropped. He was sentenced to three years in prison in February 2026.

=== National firearms register ===
In December 2023, at a National Cabinet meeting, state and territory Premiers and Chief Ministers along with Prime Minister Anthony Albanese promised to implement a National Firearms Register, Anthony Albanese cited the Wieambilla tragedy as a reason for developing this policy.

=== Coronial inquest ===
In July 2024, a coronial inquest into the shootings began before Queensland state coroner Terry Ryan. The inquest ended in August 2024 after 17 days of hearings.

The coroner's report was delivered on 21 November 2025. Ryan assessed the perpetrators as having a shared delusional disorder, based on evidence from psychiatric experts, and stated that they were "psychotically unwell and driven by their beliefs" and were "intent on dying". He found that "while end of times religious themes came central to their belief system, their psychotic disorder was underpinned by broader persecutory beliefs […] including the government was evil and the police officers attending […] were demons"

The report also examined the actions of police and concluded that the shootings would not have been prevented by better information sharing between New South Wales and Queensland police forces, or by increased protection for the responding officers, as the actions of the Trains were not foreseeable. Ryan noted the incident's "wholly unexpected and unprecedented nature" but made ten recommendations, including that the state government increase funding to a specialist threat assessment centre and consider introducing mental health assessments for firearms licences.

=== Honouring the victims and survivors ===
In December 2022 Constables Matthew Arnold and Rachel McCrow were posthumously awarded the Queensland Police Valour Medal, Queensland Police Service Medal, National Police Service Medal and National Medal recognising the sacrifice and bravery during their memorial service. Likewise, Alan Dare was posthumously awarded the Bravery Medal in March 2023.

In April 2026 the Queensland Police Service hosted a combined award ceremony in Dalby recognising the contributions of those who responded to the incident and those who were directly affected by it. These honours were state awards given by Commissioner Brett Pointing. Recipients included the surviving officers: Constable Brough, who received the Queensland Police Valour Medal and now Senior Constable Kirk, also received the Queensland Police Blue Heart Medal.

== See also ==
- List of mass shootings in Australia
- Porepunkah police shootings
- Walsh Street police shootings
- Ned Kelly

== Bibliography ==
- Ryan, State Coroner Terry (21 November 2025). Inquest into the deaths of Matthew Joseph Arnold; Rachel Clare McCrow; Alan Thomas Brendan Dare; Gareth Daniel Train; Nathaniel Charles Train and Stacey Jane Train (PDF) (Report). Coroners Court of Queensland.
