= QAD =

QAD may refer to:

- q.a.d., a medical abbreviation for quaque altera die, 'every other day'
- QAD Inc., a software company that provides enterprise resource planning software
- Quality Assurance Directorate, a constituent unit of the Royal Arsenal
- Quality Assurance Division, a predecessor of the post-secondary qualifications system Malaysian Qualifications Framework

== See also ==
- QA (disambiguation)
