= Quantitative =

Quantitative may refer to:

- Quantitative research, scientific investigation of quantitative properties
- Quantitative analysis (disambiguation)
- Quantitative verse, a metrical system in poetry
- Statistics, also known as quantitative analysis
- Numerical data, also known as quantitative data
- Quantitative color scheme, for coloring sortable data
- Quantification (science)

== See also ==
- Qualitative
