= Qualitative =

Qualitative descriptions or distinctions are based on some quality or characteristic rather than on some quantity or measured value.

Qualitative may also refer to:

- Qualitative property, a property that can be observed but not measured numerically
- Qualitative research, a research paradigm focusing on non-quantifiable measurements
- Qualitative analysis (disambiguation)
- Qualitative data, data that is not quantified
- Qualitative observation, descriptive observations we make with our senses
- Qualitative color scheme, for coloring distinct types of data
- In the philosophy of mind, an adjective used in relation to qualia

== See also ==
- Quantitative
- Quality (philosophy)
