= Queensland Honours =

- Presented by: the King in Right of Queensland

The State of Queensland has created several independent honours to that of the Australian Honours System.

== Non-service specific State awards ==
=== Citations ===
Unit citations are awarded to the organisation, and may be worn by members who served in the organisation at the time and meeting the requirements.

- 2010–2011 Queensland Flood and Cyclone Citation – Performed duty on at least one shift at any time between 1 December 2010 and 28 February 2011.
- 2014 G20 Citation – Introduced to acknowledge Government agencies during the 2014 G20 events held in Brisbane. The frame has 'G20' at the top and '2014' at the bottom. Ribbon colours of green, blue and orange are from the summit's logo.
- 2018 Commonwealth Games Citation – Introduced to acknowledge Government agencies during the 2018 Gold Coast Commonwealth Games. The frame has 'XXI COMMONWEALTH GAMES' at the top and '2018' at the bottom, with the ribbon representing the surf (blue), sand (yellow) and sun (red).
State citations

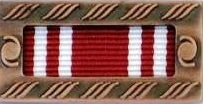
2010–2011 Queensland Flood and Cyclone Citation

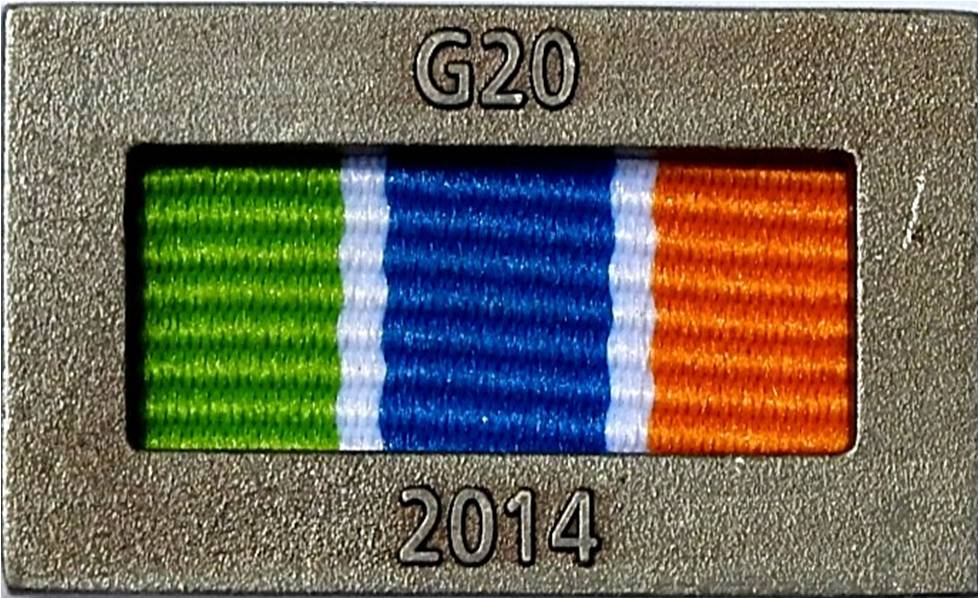
2014 G20 Citation

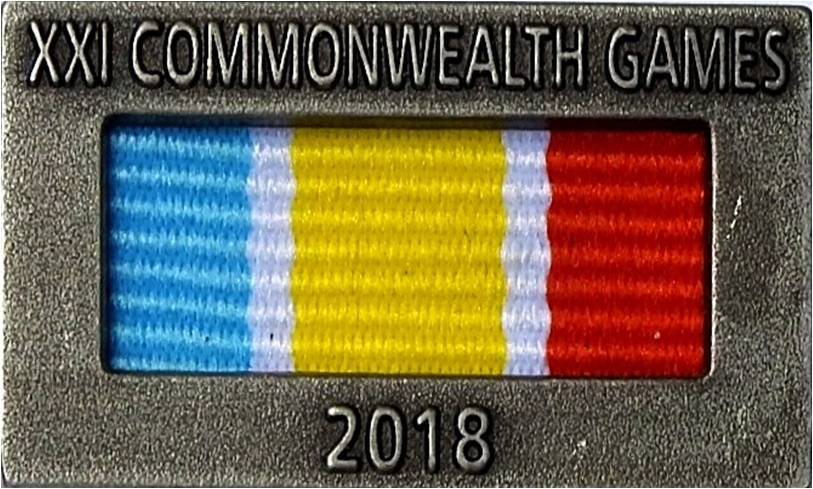
2018 Commonwealth Games Citation

== Queensland Police Service ==
=== Medals ===
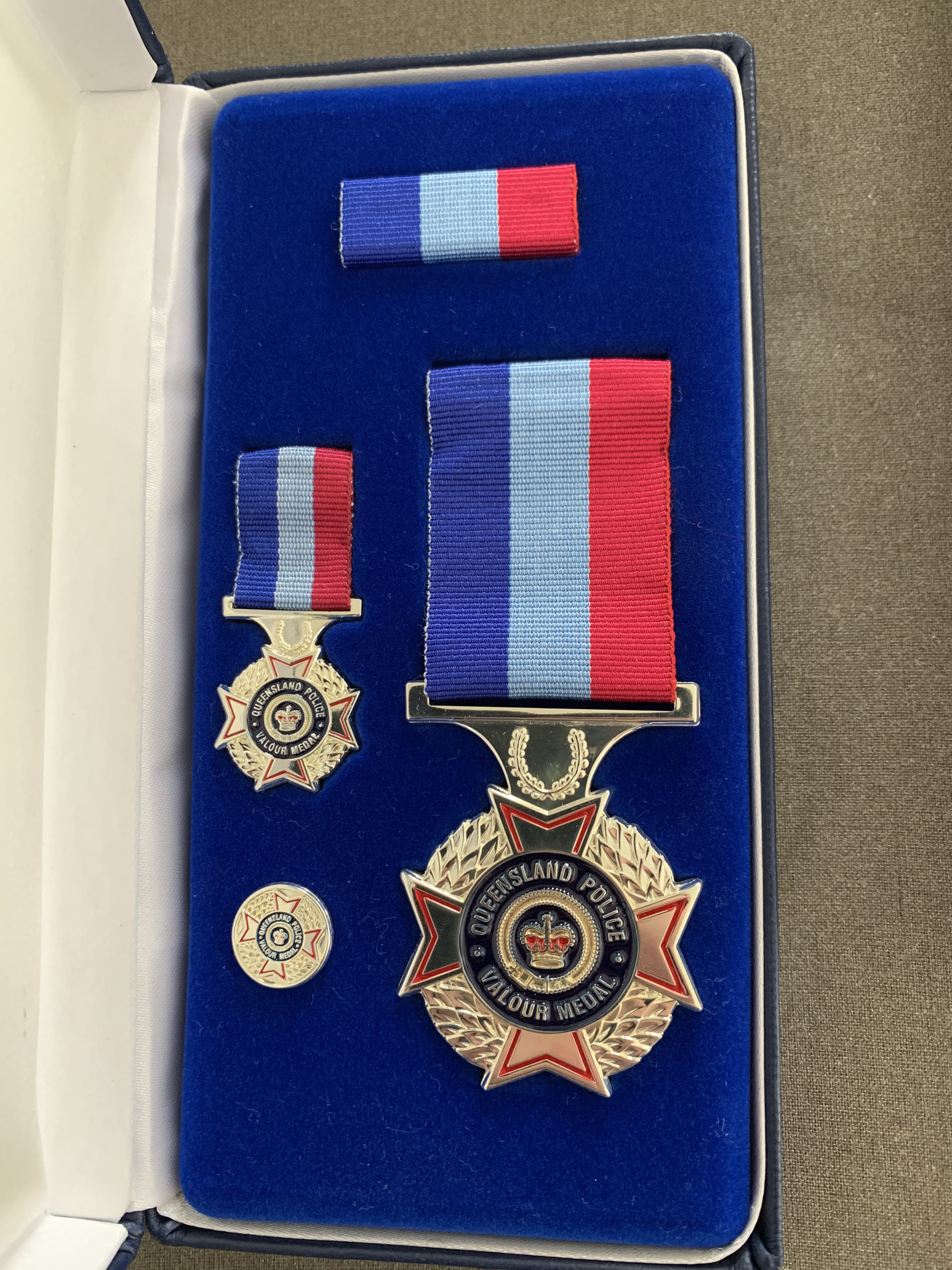
- Queensland Police Valour Medal
  Queensland Police Valour Medal – Awarded to an officer who performs an act of exceptional bravery in hazardous circumstances (established 1993).
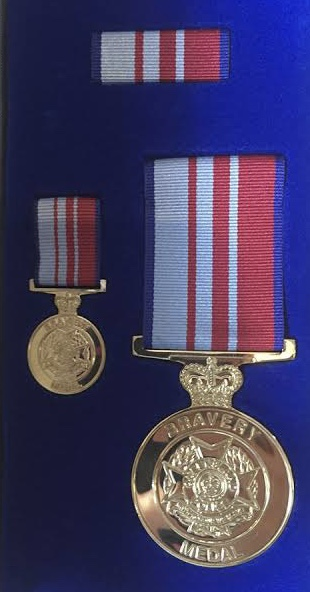
- QPS Bravery Medal
  Queensland Police Bravery Medal – Awarded to an officer who performs an act of bravery in hazardous circumstances.
- Commissioner's Certificate for Bravery – Awarded to an officer who performs an act of bravery in hazardous circumstances.
- Queensland Police Service Blue Heart Medal – Awarded to a member who has been seriously injured or killed whilst carrying out duties including during a training incident (similar to the Victoria Police Star). Created in the second half of 2023.
- Queensland Police Meritorious Service Medal – Awarded to a member who provides a continued substantial contribution in a specified category over an extended period of time. The ribbon colours are pale blue, with stripes of medium blue, and white.
- Queensland Police Exemplary Conduct Medal – Awarded to a member who is recognised for exemplary conduct in a specific role or duty which enhances the professional image of the Service far exceeding what might be reasonably expected from an efficient member of the Service. The ribbon colours are maroon, black, and white, and may have various clasps.
- Emergency Response Medal – Awarded to members who have contributed to a response and recovery effort. Created in the second half of 2023, with the first-ever clasp 'COVID-19' for members who have contributed 30 days in the COVID epidemic between 22 March 2020 and 24 May 2022.
- Remote Service Medal – First awarded in 2025.
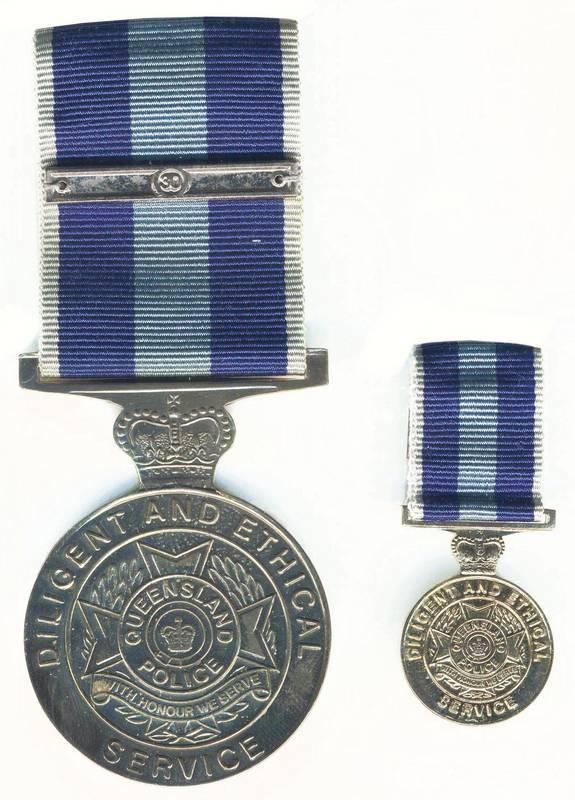
- Queensland Police Service Medal
  Queensland Police Service Medal – Awarded to an officer for ten years service, a clasp is awarded for another five years (equating to fifteen years service). The clasp is replaced every five years thereafter to read the total number of years service represented by the roundel.
QPS ribbons

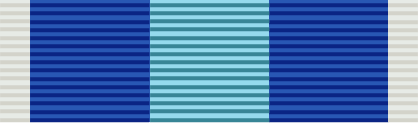
Queensland Police Service Medal good service ribbon

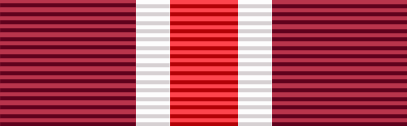
Emergency Response Medal ribbon

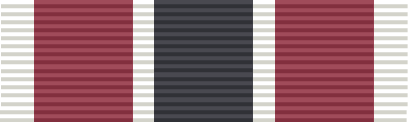
Exemplary Conduct Medal ribbon

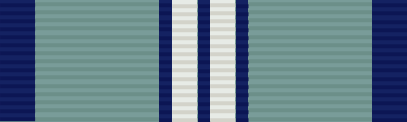
Meritorious Conduct Medal ribbon

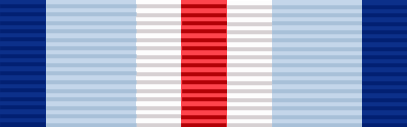
Blue Heart Medal ribbon

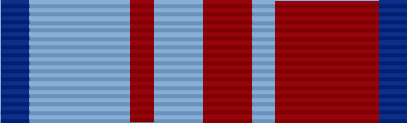
Bravery Medal ribbon

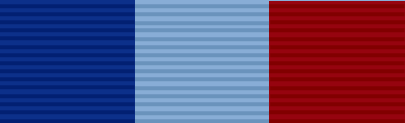
Valour Award ribbon

=== Citations ===
QPS citations

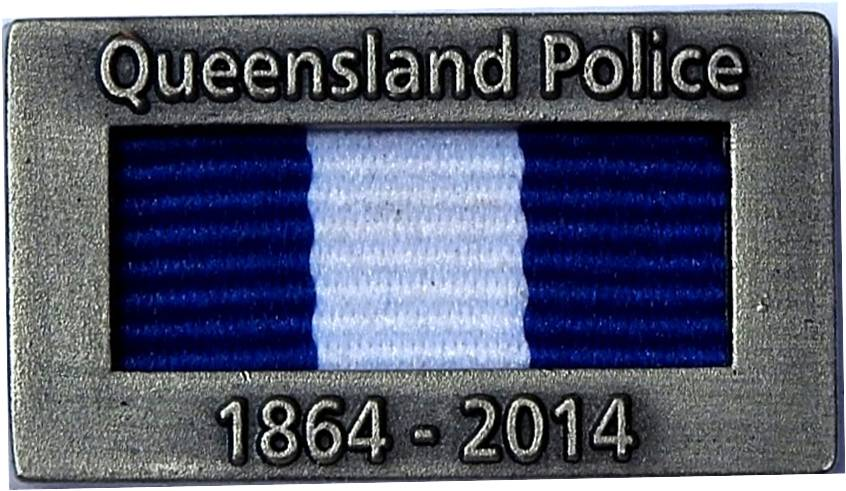
QPS 150 Years Citation

== Queensland Corrective Services ==
- Queensland Corrective Service Officer's Long Service Medal – For 10 years service
- Queensland Corrective Service Emergency Response Medal with COVID-19 clasp – The Emergency Response Medal acknowledges the dedication and resilience of officers who respond to emergency situations during a significant event in Queensland. The COVID-19 clasp recognises duties including direct response, maintaining core business or a combination of both during the COVID-19 pandemic.

== Queensland Ambulance Service ==
- Queensland Ambulance Service Distinguished Service Medal – Awarded to officers of the QAS to recognise conspicuous service and humane and brave acts.
- Commissioner's Meritorious Service Award – Awarded at the discretion of the Commissioner in recognition of any member who performs commendable service in a designated role or function to an exceptional level over an extended period of time.
- Queensland Ambulance Service Long Service Medal – Awarded to uniformed paramedics and emergency medical dispatchers for 10 years service, with a clasp awarded for each subsequent period of 10 years served.
- Commissioner's Commendation – For outstanding performance in any endeavour not attracting another award, but which deserves recognition.
- Assistant Commissioner's Commendation – For recognition of noteworthy performance in any endeavour at the Assistant Commissioner's discretion.
- Commissioner's Certificate of Appreciation – Appreciation in recognition of substantial donations to the QAS or for continued valuable assistance over the years
- Assistant Commissioner's Certificate of Appreciation – For use at the Assistant Commissioner's discretion.

== Queensland Fire Department ==
=== Medals ===
- Commissioner's Medal for Valour – For exceptional bravery in hazardous circumstances where there has been a clear and significant threat to life.
- Commissioner's Distinguished Service Medal – For Distinguished service or Outstanding actions in relation to fire service duties, administrative leadership or distinguished performance of a specific or difficult project or task, not involving bravery.
- Commissioner's Commendation for Bravery – For bravery in hazardous circumstances.
- Commissioner's Meritorious Service Award – For a member who performs outstanding service.
- Commissioner's Commendation of Notable Action – For being placed in a potentially hazardous situation beyond that of normal requirement.

Former

- Diligent and Ethical Service Medal (1990–2013) – Awarded to uniformed Fire Officers and Fire Communications Dispatch Officers for 10 years service, with a clasp awarded for each subsequent period of 10 years served.
- Queensland Fire and Emergency Services Medal (2013–2025) – Awarded to uniformed Fire Officers and Fire Communications Dispatch Officers for 10 years service, with a clasp awarded for each subsequent period of 10 years served.
QFD ribbons

Queensland Fire and Emergency Services Medal (2013–2025) ribbon

=== Citations ===
- Commissioner's Unit Citation – For outstanding action by a group or unit in exceptional circumstances
- Deputy Commissioner's Unit Citation – Above and beyond the expectations of their role
- Assistant Commissioner's Unit Citation – Above and beyond the expectations of their role

=== Special honours ===
- Certificate of Commendation – For specific meritorious or outstanding actions in relation to fire service duties or exemplary performance in a specific difficult or long term project or task.
- Certificate of Appreciation – For assistance provided to fire service duties or exemplary performance in a specific project or task.
- Naming of New Appliances – Distinguished service by members of the QFRS may be recognised by having new fire appliances named after them.

== Queensland State Emergency Service ==
=== Medals ===
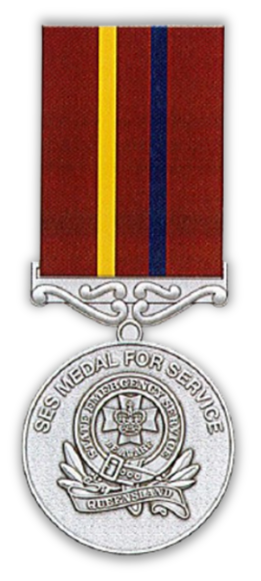
- SES Medal for Service
  SES Medal for Service – Awarded to a member for 10 years service, a clasp is awarded for another 5-year (equating to 15 years service).
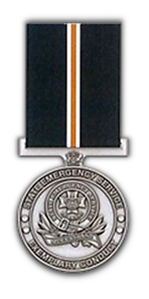
- Exemplary Service Medal
  Exemplary Service Medal (ESM) – Awarded to a member who has demonstrated exemplary conduct in a specific role or duty which enhances the professional image of the SES far exceeding what might reasonably expected from an efficient member of the SES. The ribbon colours are blue, orange and white. The medal has various clasps.
- Emergency Response Medal (ERM) – Recognises Queensland SES members who have deployed in response to, or support of, declared emergencies in Queensland, in another Australian state or international jurisdiction to events recognised by the Chief Officer. The ribbon colours are orange, white and maroon. Rosettes are awarded for multiple events.

Former

- Meritorious Service Medal (1975–2025) – Awarded to a member for 10 years service, a clasp is awarded for another 5-year (equating to 15 years service).
SES ribbons

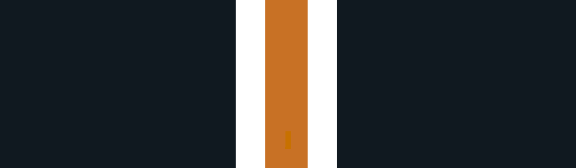
Exemplary Conduct Medal ribbon

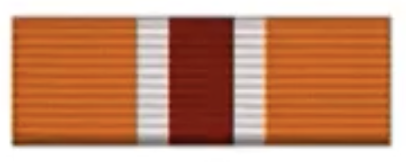
Emergency Response Medal ribbon

Medal for Service (2025–present) ribbon

Meritorious Service Medal (1975–2025) ribbon

=== Citations ===
- State Emergency Service Citation (2024). The frame has 'State Emergency Service' at the top and '2024' at the bottom.
- State Emergency Service (5 Year Citation). The frame has 'State Emergency Service' at the top and '5 Years Service' at the bottom.
SES citations

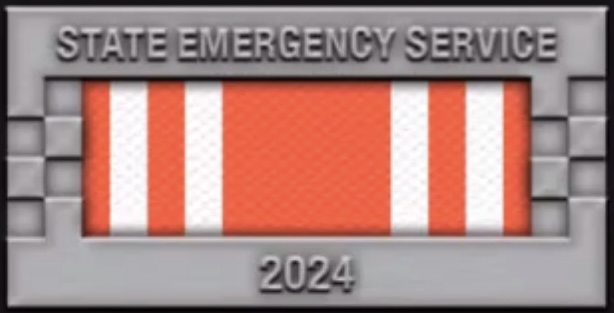
SES Citation (2024)

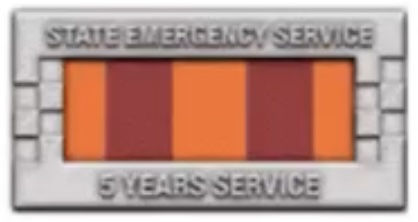
SES 5 Years Service Citation

=== Other Awards ===
- The Queensland State Emergency Service (SES) Life Member Award (LMA) recognise SES volunteer members who have given a strong, outstanding individual commitment and special contribution to the service.
- SES Week Awards – State Awards consist of The Minister's Cup; The Commissioner's Cup; The Assistant Commissioner's Shield; and The Joyce Scorey Shield.
- SES Week Awards – Regional Awards consist of the SES Regional Member of the Year; the SES Regional Unit/Group of the Year; Operational Response of the Year; the SES Regional Trainer of the Year; and Regional SES Week Awards for individuals. Each region will issue these awards.

== See also ==
- New South Wales Honours
