= QAS (disambiguation) =

QAS may stand for:

- Queensland Ambulance Service
- Queensland Academy of Sport
- Quick arbitration and selection, as used in Parallel SCSI interfaces
- Queen Alexandra's Royal Army Nursing Corps (QAs)
- Quaternary ammonium salt

== See also ==
- QA (disambiguation)
- Qass, Azerbaijan
- Qāṣṣ
