= QA =

QA or qa may refer to:

== Businesses ==
=== Airlines ===
- Qantas Airlines, Australia (founded 1920)
- Aerocaribe, Mexico (1972–2005)
- Cimber (airline), Denmark (2012–2018))
- MexicanaClick, Mexico (2005–2010)

=== Education ===
- QA (company), a British training company
- Qatar Academy, a group of International Baccalaureate schools

== Language ==
- Qa (cuneiform), a sign in cuneiform writing
- Qa (Cyrillic), a character used in the Kurdish alphabet

== Places ==
- Qatar, Arabian country (ISO 3166-1:QA)
- Queen Alexandra Hospital, Portsmouth, England

== Science and technology ==
- QA (robot), a two-wheeled balancing telepresence robot developed by Anybots
- .qa, the country code top level domain (ccTLD) for Qatar
- ATCvet code QA Alimentary tract and metabolism, a section of the Anatomical Therapeutic Chemical Classification System for veterinary medicinal products
- "Qa-1", a form of alloantigen
- Qualitative analysis (disambiguation)
  - Qualitative inorganic analysis, when shortened to qualitative analysis, can be abbreviated to QA
- Quality assurance, a process or set of processes used to measure and assure the quality of a product
- Quantitative analysis (disambiguation), the application of quantitative techniques in various areas of data analysis (e.g. finance)
  - Quantitative analysis (chemistry), the measurements of quantities of substances produced in reactions rather than simply noting the nature of the reactions
- Question answering, a type of information retrieval

== See also ==
- Q&A (disambiguation)
- QAS (disambiguation)
- AQ (disambiguation)
- A (disambiguation)
- Q (disambiguation)
