= Emergency Management Queensland =

Government Division in Queensland, Australia

Division overview
- Type: Emergency management
- Jurisdiction: Queensland
- Headquarters: Corner Park Road and Kedron Park Road, Kedron, Queensland
- Minister responsible: Minister for Police and Community Safety
- Parent department: Department of Community Safety
- Website: www.emergency.qld.gov.au/emq/

Emergency Management Queensland was the emergency division of the Department of Community Safety. The Queensland Fire and Rescue Service also belonged to the department. It aimed to plan and prepare for disasters as well as rescue and protect persons, property and the environment from disaster and emergency. Jack Dempsey, Minister for Police and Community Safety was responsible for the division.

== Functions ==
Emergency Management Queensland was responsible for disaster preparedness, disaster awareness and the coordination of various rescue, response and recovery services in the state. The division provided support to the State Emergency Service in Queensland, worked closely with the Bureau of Meteorology and coordinated volunteers for disaster clean-up operations. It also provided an air ambulance service called EMQ Helicopter Rescue.

The division had two Bell 412 utility helicopters and three AW139 twin-engined helicopters with one each based in Cairns, Townsville and Brisbane. All three AW139s were grounded after the same model aircraft crashed in China and Brazil in August 2011. Prior to this grounding the helicopters experienced tail and rotor problems and were the subject of criticism over their expense from supporters of other rescue helicopters, which means two of EMQs Bell 412s were used for medivacs during the AW139 grounding. The other rescue helicopters operating in Queensland are RACQ LifeFlight with 14 government funded helicopters, RACQ CQ Rescue, RACQ Capricorn Helicopter Rescue, RACQ NQ Rescue and the Westpac Life Saver Rescue Helicopter Service.

== Operations ==
Emergency Management Queensland may assist communities experiencing threats from floods, cyclones, storm surge, severe storms, landslides, heatwaves and bushfires and to a lesser extent earthquakes and tsunamis.

EMQ managed Operation Yasi Assist, a multi-service activity by the Australian Defence Force as a contribution to the response to Severe Tropical Cyclone Yasi. The EMQ together with Surf Life Saving Queensland established rescue coordination centres in Brisbane to provide emergency assistance to residents who were affected by the 2010–11 Queensland floods.

== See also ==
- AFCOM
- Emergency medical services in Australia
- National Council for Fire & Emergency Services
