= Polair Queensland =

Aviation division of the Queensland Police Service

IATA	ICAO	Call sign
—	—	POLAIR
- AOC #: CASA.138AWK.0155; CASA.138AWK.0519; CASA.AOC.0593; CASA.AOC.0187
- Operating bases: Brisbane, Archerfield, Townsville, Cairns, Mount Isa, Horn Island, Caloundra, Southport
- Hubs: Brisbane
- Fleet size: 21
- Headquarters: Queensland Police Headquarters, Brisbane

Polair Queensland is the police aviation unit of the Queensland Police Service (QPS), operating officially under the umbrella of the Aviation Capability Group. Its predecessor was called the Police Air Wing, which became operational in 1975 following the purchase of two single-engine aircraft.

The QPS operates a number of fixed wing, rotary and unmanned aerial vehicle (UAV) assets spread across various locations around the State.

The majority of aircraft of the fleet are kept from public view on most publicly accessible flight tracking apps and websites. This is to preserve investigations, ensure the safety of the crew and aircraft, allow for covert operations, and to prevent suspects from viewing locations of the aircraft.

== History ==
The Police Air Wing was established in 1975 with the purchase of two ex-army Cessna 180E aircraft (one was VH-PFM). Four police officers who were qualified pilots were attached to the Wing, with some more commencing flight training.

The fixed wing fleet grew, ferrying officers and prisoners across the State. Aircraft included the all-weather 1982 Beechcraft B200 Super King Air. By 1980, operations moved from Archerfield aerodrome to all-hours access Brisbane Airport, and one from Cairns. The Police Air Wing was closed in November 1983 after the creation of the Queensland Government Air Wing, but reconstituted in April 1985 with a portion of the government air wing. By mid-1986 the Police Air Unit had five pilots, all staff members, not police officers; with four planes (King Air 200, King Air 90, Cessna 402, and Cessna 210) and operating out of Brisbane, Cairns, and Mount Isa. By the 2000s, an aircraft also operated at Horn Island.

In November 2011, a police helicopter 'Polair' was commenced as a trial, funded by the Gold Coast City Council. 'Polair 2' based in Archerfield, Brisbane, commenced in 2012 on trial, before permanent funding commenced in July 2014, and Townsville's Polair launched on 16 January 2024. The helicopters included a Eurocopter BO 105 Super Five, before the fleet was updated with Bell 429 helicopters in February 2022.

The new Commissioner in April 2024 immediately embarked on a coastal provincial tour with Police Minister Ryan and Premier Miles, which saw the announcements of forthcoming funding for Polair rotary-wing in Cairns, and the Sunshine Coast/Wide Bay.

== Fixed wing ==
Commencing from 1975, the Service operates a varying fleet of aircraft, both single and twin engine, for numerous tasks such as: organ retrievals, Special Emergency Response Team and tactical operator response, prisoner transport, disaster response, aerial surveillance, search and rescue, transporting police officers and senior leaders, transporting state government ministers and other politicians, and transporting freight.

In 2018, the nineteen-year-old Cessna 560 Citation jet VH-PSU travelling the Brisbane–Townsville route was subject to a mid-air emergency near Gladstone with an altitude drop, without further incident.

In 2022, replacement fleet included the five Beechcraft King Air 360 turboprops, and two Gulfstream G280 jets (replacing the Citation and Hawker jets). At this time, the aviation group was performing six organ retrievals per month, and the new fleet was to have capability to be able to conduct organ retrieval flights anywhere in Australia and New Zealand.

There are two dedicated surveillance aircraft: VH-8TT (King Air 360) and VH-PSQ (Cessna 208 Caravan) which both feature electro-optical sensors among other surveillance equipment. Both aircraft are in a non-distinct livery and usually do not appear on civilian flight tracking applications.

Not all the aircraft feature the QPS Polair livery and identifications which might suggest they are police aircraft.

Bases	Aircraft Type	Number in fleet	Notes
Brisbane, Cairns, Townsville	King Air 360	5	
Brisbane, Cairns, Townsville	King Air 350	1	
Brisbane, Cairns, Townsville	Cessna 208 Caravan	3	

== Surveillance and patrol helicopters ==
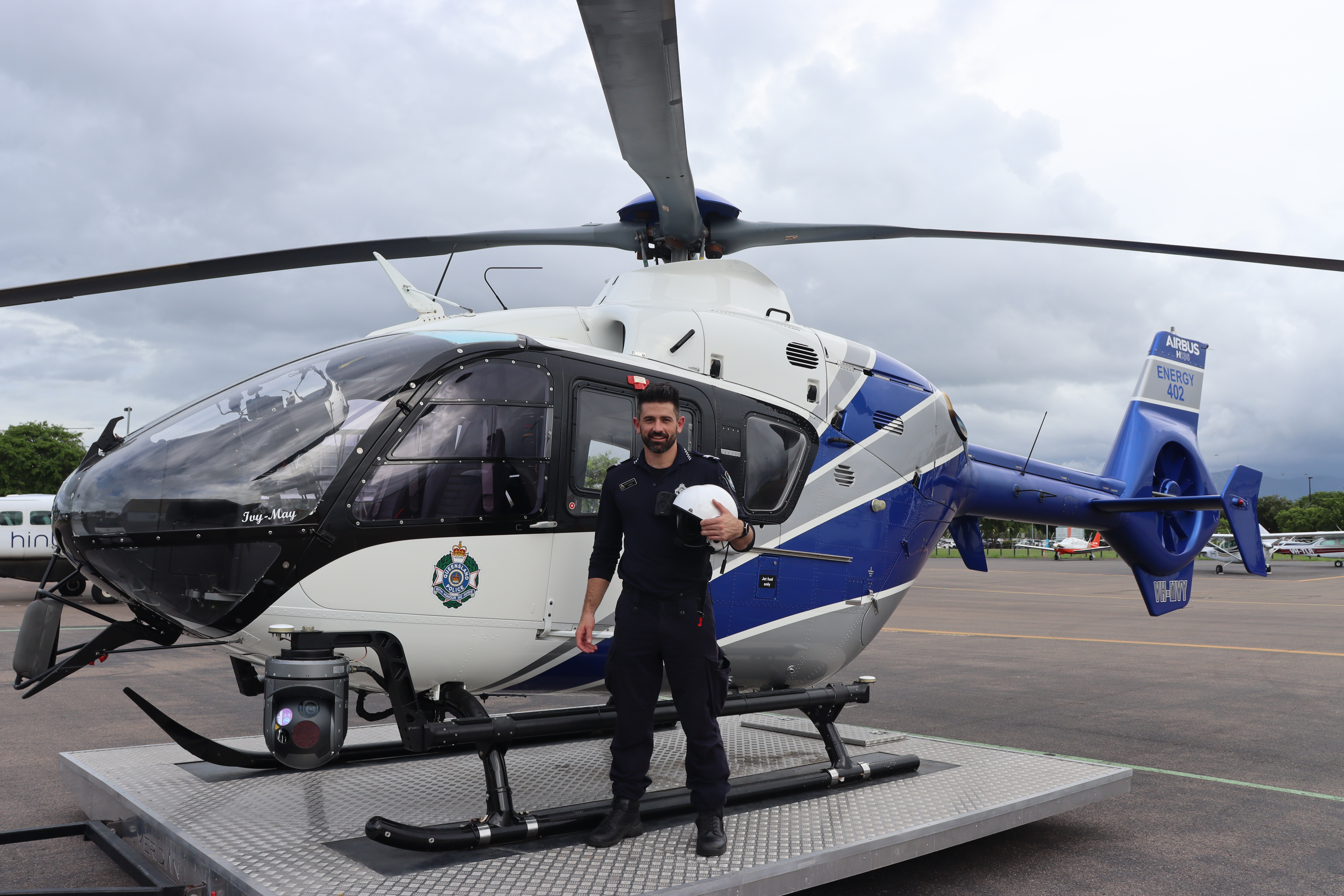
Launch of the first interim H135 for Townsville

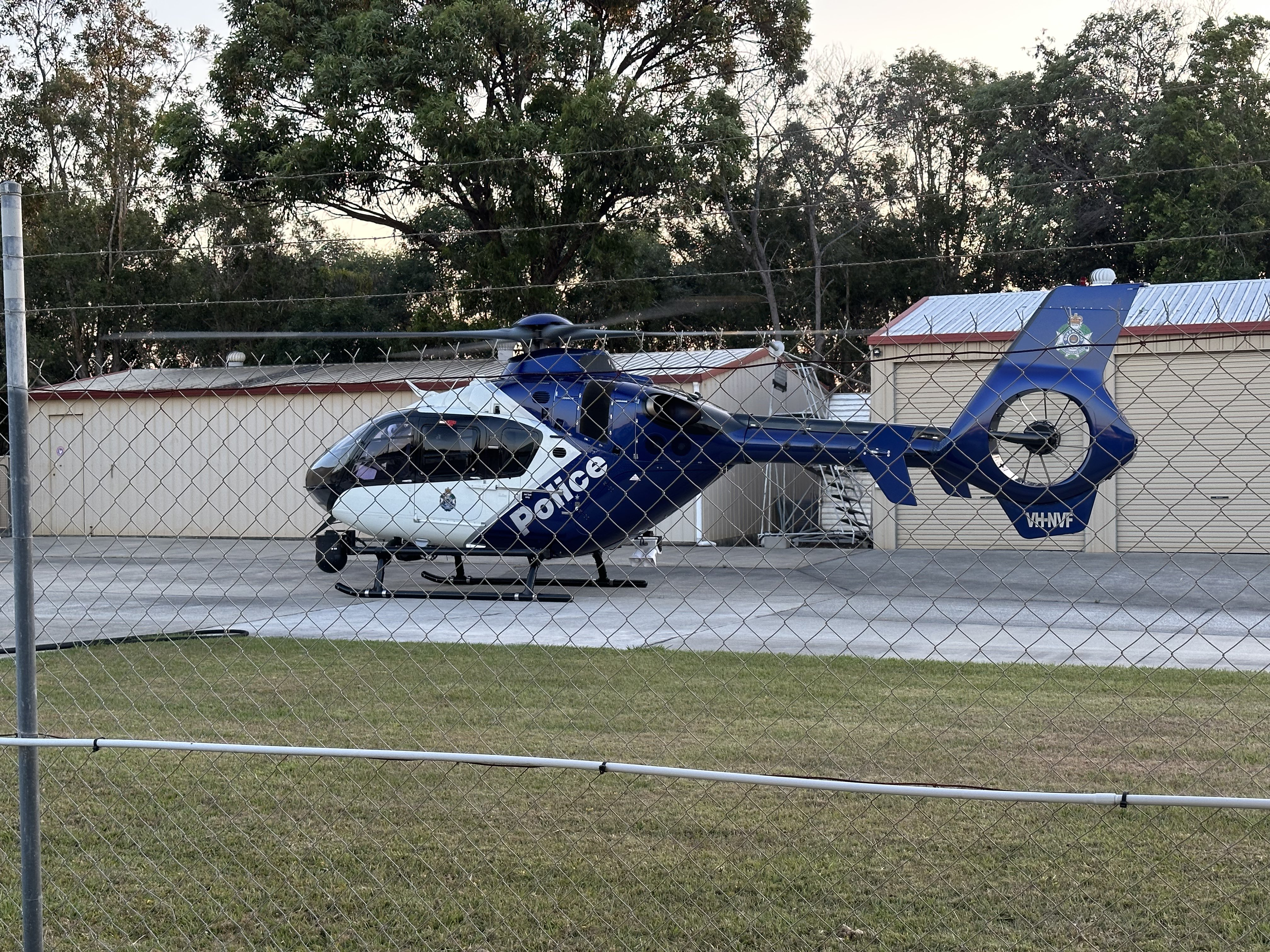
The Caloundra-based H135

Commencing from November 2011, the surveillance and patrol fleet have a distinctive police livery, and are operated by contractors on behalf of the Service.

January 2024 saw the introduction of an Airbus H135 twin-engine for Townsville as a temporary measure until a permanent helicopter was procured. On 3 July 2024, three new Bell 429s replaced two older aircraft, for south-eastern Queensland and equipped with various technologies including night vision capabilities.

A Bell 429 flight simulator is located at the SLSQ helicopter base at Archerfield Airport, it is used by crew for training purposes. An additional Bell 429 flight simulator has been purchased for the Meridian Helicopters operated Far North Capability at Townsville Airport.

The aircraft are fitted with high-end infrared electro optical cameras, a spotlight, blue and red emergency lights, public address speakers, video downlink, secure radios, and basic rescue/first aid equipment.

All the aircraft in the fleet are twin engine only, as this is a crucial safety feature for flying over populated areas.

Region	Areas served	Operator	Aircraft type	Base	Notes
Far Northern	Cairns	Meridian Helicopters	Airbus H135	Cairns Airport	H135s to be replaced by two Bell 429s (2024)
Northern	Townsville	Meridian Helicopters	Airbus H135	Townsville Airport	H135s to be replaced by two Bell 429s (2024)
Northern	Townsville	Meridian Helicopters	Bell 429	Townsville Airport	H135s to be replaced by two Bell 429s (2024)
North Coast	Wide Bay/Sunshine Coast	Surf Life Saving Queensland	Airbus H135	Caloundra Aerodrome	
Southern and Brisbane	Brisbane, Ipswich, Darling Downs, Logan, Moreton Bay	Surf Life Saving Queensland	Bell 429	Archerfield Airport	
Southern and Brisbane	Brisbane, Ipswich, Darling Downs, Logan, Moreton Bay	Surf Life Saving Queensland	Bell 429	Archerfield Airport	
Southern and Brisbane	Gold Coast	Surf Life Saving Queensland	Bell 429	Southport Airport	Formerly based at Carrara Rescue Base

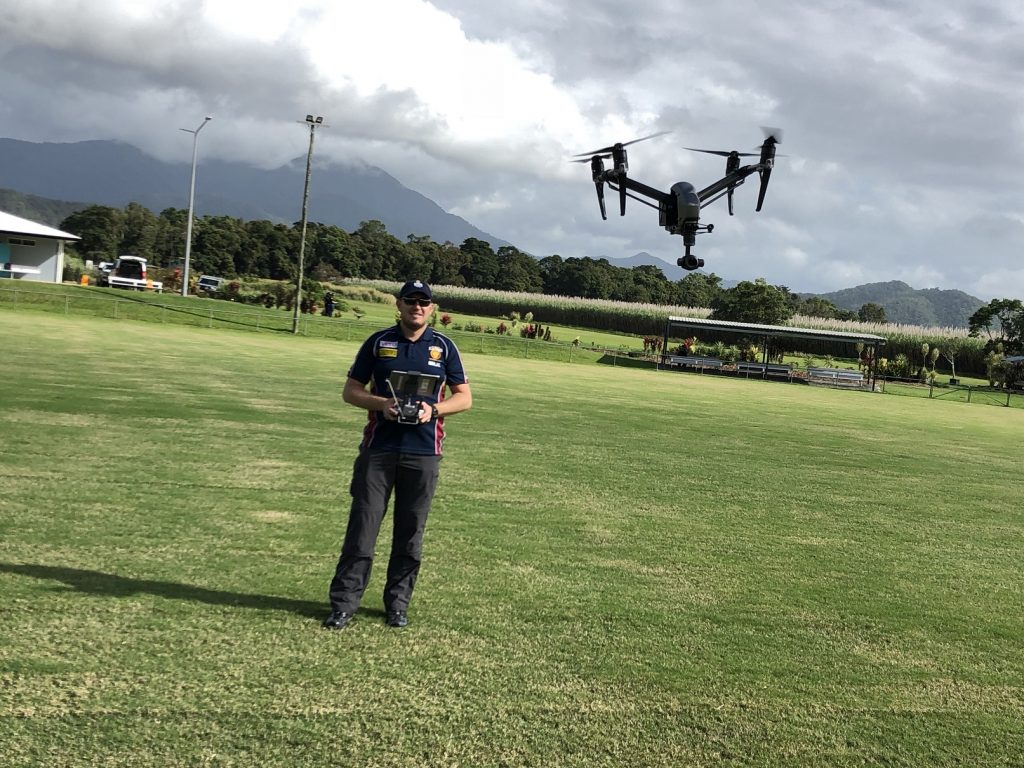
QPS UAV

== Remotely piloted aircraft systems ==
The aviation wing also overviews the use of remotely piloted aircraft systems (RPAS), under the control of the Service Chief Pilot (RPAS). All operators follow the Service's Operational Procedures Manual policies which includes holding Civil Aviation Safety Authority certification.

== Previous aircraft ==
Fixed wing

- Beechcraft 1900D
- Cessna 180E VH-PFM was used from 1975.
- Cessna 402B
- Cessna 421C
- Cessna 441
- Cessna 560 Citation VH-PSU was used until 2022.
- Cessna 550 Citation II
- Hawker 850XP jet, 2006 VH-SGY, in use until 2022
- Pilatus Britten-Norman BN-2A Islander

Rotary wing

- Bell 206 Long Ranger
- Bell 412 (QG Air Rescue)
- MBB Bo 105
