= Quantitative analysis =

Quantitative analysis may refer to:

- Quantitative research, application of mathematics and statistics in economics and marketing
- Quantitative analysis (chemistry), the determination of the absolute or relative abundance of one or more substances present in a sample
- Quantitative analysis (finance), the use of mathematical and statistical methods in finance and investment management
- Quantitative analysis of behavior, quantitative models in the experimental analysis of behavior
- Mathematical psychology, an approach to psychological research using mathematical modeling of perceptual, cognitive and motor processes
- Statistics, the collection, organization, analysis, interpretation and presentation of data

== See also ==
- QA (disambiguation)
