= Queensland State Emergency Service =

Volunteer emergency management service

- The badge of the State Emergency Service

Agency overview
- Formed: December 11, 1975
- Preceding agency: Queensland Civil Defence Organisation
- Jurisdiction: Queensland Government
- Headquarters: Nundah, Queensland, Australia
- Employees: Approximately 5,000 members
- Annual budget: A$60 million (2024)
- Minister responsible: Dan Purdie, Minister for Police and Emergency Services
- Agency executives: Brett Pointing, Commissioner; vacant, Chief Officer
- Parent agency: Queensland Police Service
- Key document: State Emergency Service Act 2024
- Website: ses.qld.gov.au

The State Emergency Service (SES) is a volunteer-based civil defence organisation in Queensland, Australia. The SES functions as an auxiliary to other emergency services, such as the police service and fire department, and assists with disaster preparation, response and recovery. The organisation is administered as a division under the Queensland Police Service.

== History ==
=== 1970s ===
From its beginning in 1961 until November 1973, the Queensland Civil Defence Organisation (QCDO) was set up to deal with emergencies in the event of a nuclear war. It took no part in natural disaster operations other than operations following Cyclone Althea in December 1971. In November 1973, a tornado caused considerable damage in the Brisbane area and the QCDO was activated to assist in disaster relief. The QCDO saw a much larger involvement in natural disasters during the 1974 Brisbane flood.

In 1975, the State Government introduced the State Counter-Disaster Organisation Act 1975, which was proclaimed on 11 December 1975. The Act established two organisations, the State Counter-Disaster Organisation (SCDO), and the State Emergency Service (SES).

In accordance with section 14 of the Act, the SES was established because there was a need for a service that was capable of dealing with natural disasters, separate to a civil defence role.

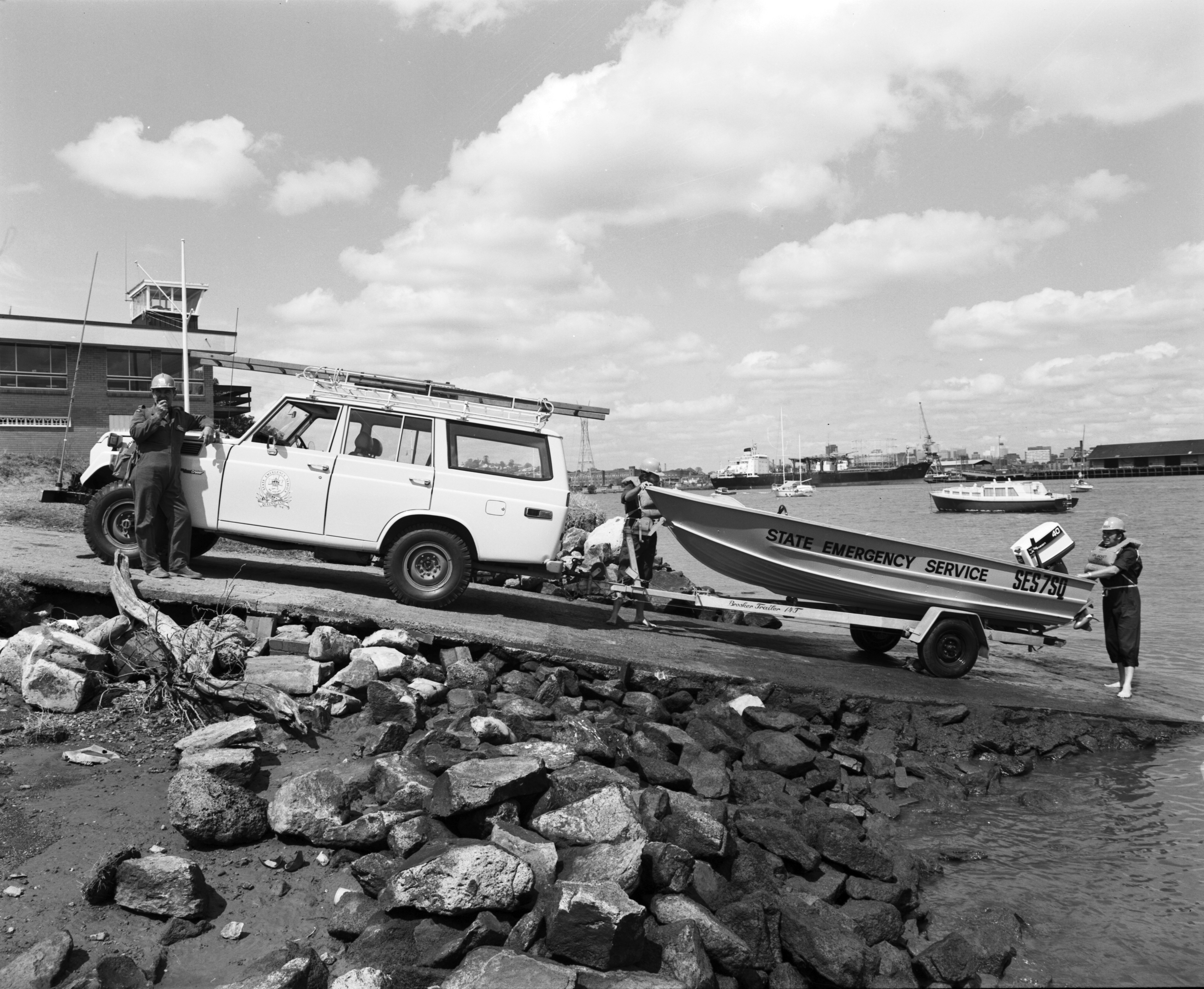
State Emergency Service training at Bulimba, Brisbane River, circa 1976

=== 2000s ===
During 2002–03 the Department of Emergency Services undertook a comprehensive review of the State Counter-Disaster Organisation Act 1975 in consultation with a wide range of stakeholders. The review resulted in the development of the Disaster Management Act 2003, which commenced by proclamation on 31 March 2004. Following legislation updates on 21 May 2014 the SES was now established under the Queensland Fire and Emergency Services Act 1990.

The Act maintained many elements of the existing system established under the State Counter-Disaster Organisation Act, while adding contemporary elements such as a focus on comprehensive disaster management, which includes disaster mitigation, prevention, preparedness, response and recovery.

=== 2010s ===
In 2011, the SES was a recipient of the Queensland Greats Awards.

=== 2020s ===
In October 2022, following a review by State Disaster Coordinator Steve Gollschewski, it was announced the QFES would be dissolved in June 2024, resulting in the largest reform of emergency services in Queensland since 1990. The Queensland Fire and Rescue Service along with the Rural Fire Service would form the Queensland Fire Department, with a new central headquarters. On Monday 3 June 2024 the SES was transitioned to the Queensland Police Service, and along with a newly created Marine Rescue Queensland (MRQ), were made part of the Queensland emergency services; in accordance with the State Emergency Service Act 2024 and Marine Rescue Queensland Act 2024 respectively.

On 25 September 2024, the organisation moved from its headquarters at Kedron to a new headquarters at 1231 Sandgate Road, Nundah, co-sharing with Marine Rescue Queensland.

== Role ==
The SES is a volunteer-based and community-oriented emergency support agency, providing emergency and rescue services in times of natural disasters and other emergencies. The main roles are preparing for, and responding to various types of emergencies and disasters, ranging from a local-level to a national disaster much like the 2010–2011 Queensland floods or Cyclone Yasi.

Units are organised at a local government level to provide emergency support functions to local communities. These units have separate groups established, depending on population and geographical needs. At present, there are 337 SES groups. The SES is designed to empower people to help themselves and others in their community in times of emergency and disaster. The basic concept is one of self-help and mutual assistance within each community.

The SES are trained and equipped to deal with emergencies such as:

- Cyclones and storms
- Floods
- Bushfires
- Urban search and rescue
- Emergency traffic management
- Vertical rescue
- Road crash rescue
- Searches for missing persons/land searches
- Nuclear, biological and chemical (NBC) incidents
- Community education
- Agency support

== Leadership ==
The following list chronologically records those who have held the post of SES Chief Officer.

Period served	Name	Notes
5 February 2024 – c. 12 July 2026	Mark Armstrong, CSC	Inaugural Chief Officer of SES. He was also a brigadier in the Australian Army.

== Ranks ==
Community member	Field operations member	Senior field operations member	Leading field operations member	Deputy group leader	Group leader	Deputy local controller	Local controller
SES officer Grade One	SES officer Grade Two	Area controller	Executive manager	Regional director	Chief Officer		

== Honours and awards ==
Members may be eligible for Australian and Queensland Honours.

SES medals and ribbons are worn in accordance with the strict order of precedence below, from centre to right. The award with the highest precedence is worn closest to the centre of the chest and on the top row of ribbon bars when more than four awards are worn. Members are only eligible for one medal, not both.

SES Exemplary Conduct Medal	Awarded to an SES member whose exemplary conduct in a specific role or duty significantly enhances the professional image well beyond what would reasonably be expected.
Emergency Response Medal	Recognises Queensland SES members who have deployed in response to, or support of, declared emergencies in Queensland, in another Australian state or international jurisdiction to events recognised by the Chief Officer. The ribbon colours are orange, white and maroon. Rosettes are awarded for multiple events.
SES Medal for Service	Awarded for 10 years service, a clasp is added every 5 years following.

Citations

Citations are worn centrally, 5 mm above the nameplate on the right breast pocket of service shirts, tunics and coats. Citation order of precedence is:

2010–2011 Queensland Flood and Cyclone Citation	Awarded for service during one or more natural disasters: Cyclone Tasha, Cyclone Yasi, and 2010–11 Queensland floods
G20 Citation	Awarded for service during the 2014 G20 Brisbane summit
XXI Commonwealth Games Citation	Awarded for service during the XXI Commonwealth Games 2018
SES Citation	Awarded for service during the transition to QPS on 1 June 2024
SES 5 Years of Service Citation	Awarded after 5 years of good conduct and committed service to the SES

== See also ==
- State Emergency Service
