= Qualitative analysis =

Qualitative analysis may refer to:

- Qualitative research, an inquiry into the reasoning behind human behavior
- Qualitative inorganic analysis, a type of chemical analysis

In terms of organic compound:- It used to analyse the sample of drug or chemical as mentioned on the label on the container including its molecular formula, state, stability etc.
