= Queensland Ambulance Service =

State ambulance service in Queensland, Australia

Agency overview
- Formed: 12 September 1892
- Preceding agencies: City Ambulance Transport Brigade; Queensland Ambulance Service Transport Brigades
- Jurisdiction: Queensland Government
- Employees: 6,600
- Agency executives: Craig Emery ASM, Commissioner; Dee Taylor Dutton ASM, Deputy Commissioner – South QLD; Kari Arbouin, Deputy Commissioner – North QLD; Stephen Zsombok ASM, Deputy Commissioner
- Parent department: Queensland Health
- Website: ambulance.qld.gov.au

The Queensland Ambulance Service (QAS) is the state emergency ambulance and patient transport provider in Queensland, Australia. QAS is part of the Queensland Government under the Queensland Health portfolio and is one of the largest ambulance services in the world.

QAS provides emergency response services, pre-hospital patient care, specialised transport services, coordination of aero-medical services and inter-hospital transfers to all of Queensland, accounting around 4.7 million people spread over 1,727,000 km^{2} (667,000 sq mi).

Over 4500 FTE staff are employed by QAS, around 87% of whom are front-line staff. QAS operates out of 290 response locations across the state, and handled over 946,000 cases and 737,803 triple zero calls in 2015/16.

== History ==
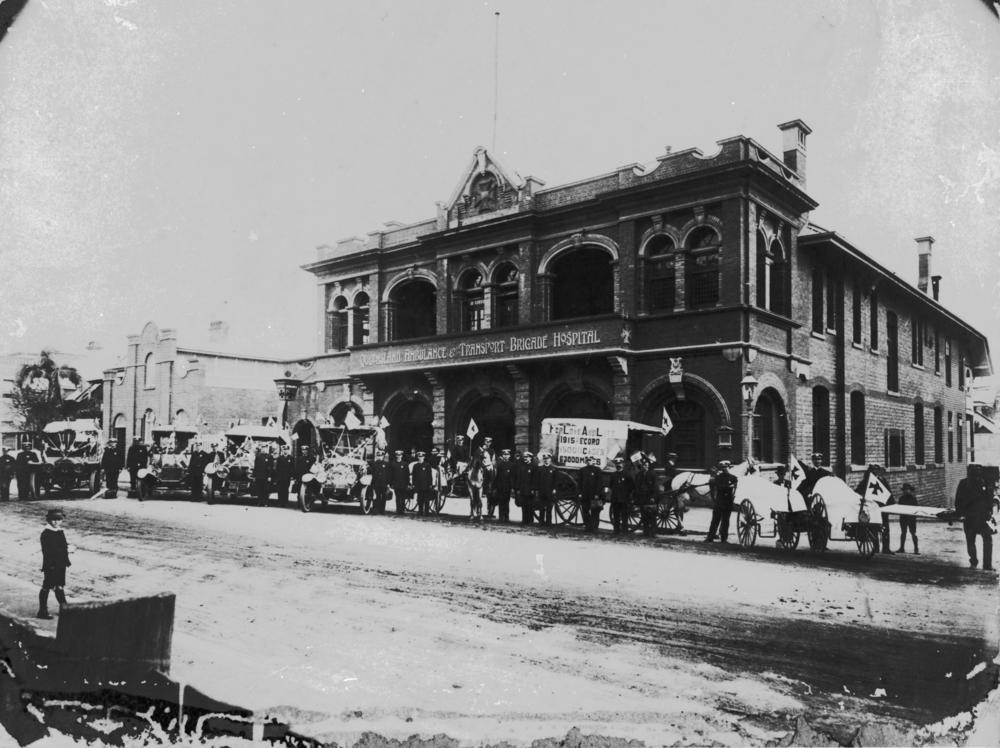
The QATB Hospital, ca. 1915

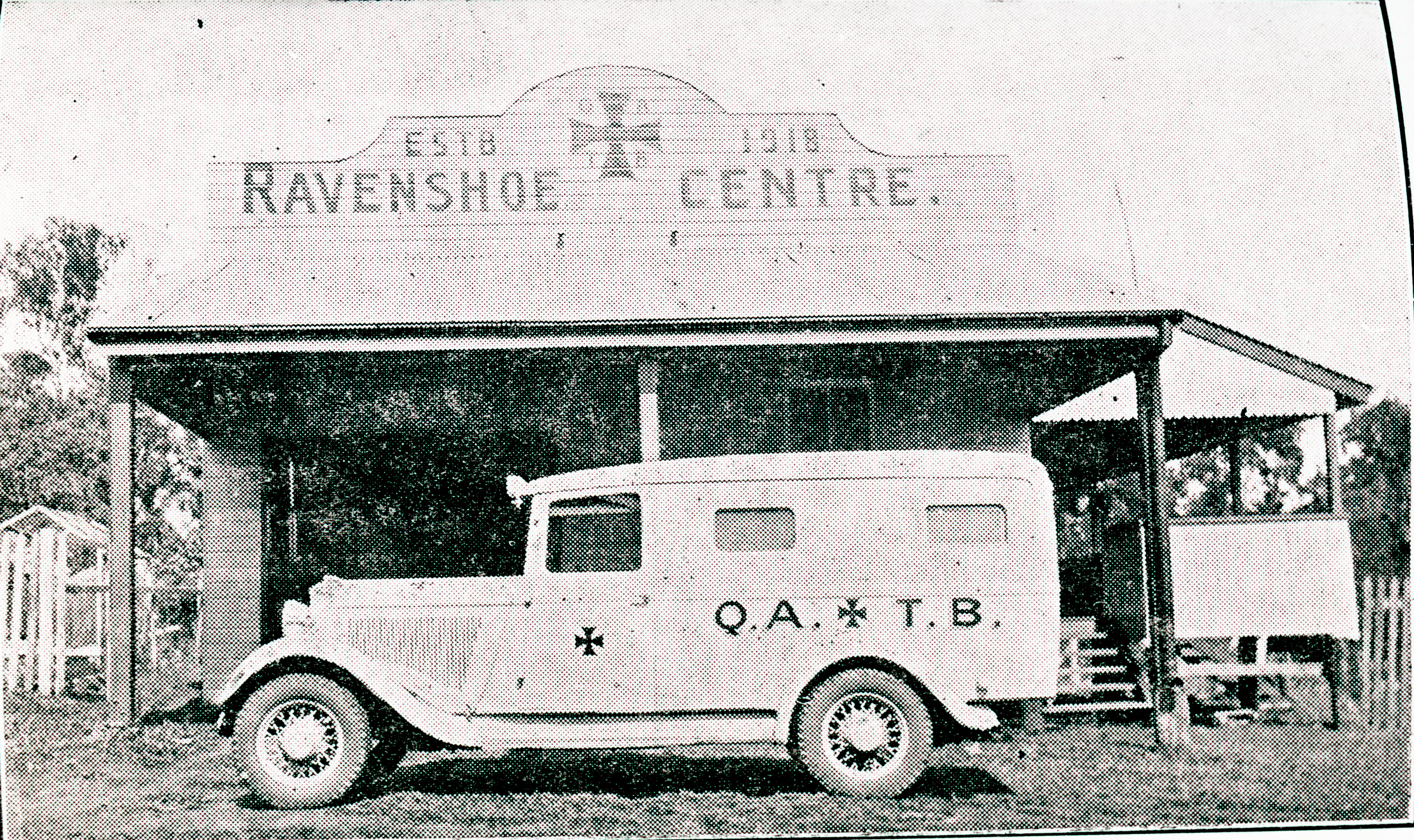
Ambulance and health centre in Ravenshoe, c. 1918

Ambulance services in Queensland first began in 1892. Military medic Seymour Warrian held the first meeting of the City Ambulance Transport Brigade on 12 September of that year. Queensland's first ambulance station operated out of the Brisbane Newspaper Company building; the first officers possessed a stretcher, but no vehicle, and so transported patients on foot. A year after the establishment of the Brisbane centre, another was established in Charters Towers in north Queensland, eventually growing to over 90 community controlled ambulance centres.

The Queensland Ambulance Service (QAS) as currently known was formed on 1 July 1991 from the amalgamation of 96 individual Queensland ambulance service transport brigades (QATB). While QAS originally operated under the banner of the Department of Emergency Services, in 2009 the Queensland Government restructured the organisational hierarchy and appointed new ministers. It became part of the Department of Community Safety, along with the Queensland Fire and Rescue Service, Emergency Management Queensland and Department of Corrective Services. As a result of the Keelty Review of Police and Community Safety in Queensland, the QAS transitioned into the Queensland Department of Health as of 1 October 2013, retaining its separate identity, rank structure and commissioner.

== Structure and operations ==
=== Support ===
The QAS was initially divided into six operational regions across Queensland, until the Northern Region was split to form 'Far Northern Region'. This model reflected a similar structure in the then Queensland Fire and Rescue Authority. In 2012, the QAS Structural Reform Report, a comprehensive review of QAS operations, lead to a restructure of operations, and a decentralisation of control to local networks. Instead of large regions, the service would be divided into fifteen geographical local ambulance service networks (LASNs) aligning with Queensland health and hospital service networks. A sixteenth network was established as state operations centres, with the existing seven communications centres to become operations centres, reporting directly to a central assistant commissioner. The LASNs vary in size according to population and stations, and are categorised from Category 1 (largest) to Category 5 (smallest). The categorisation simply reflects their size and gives a foundation for staffing allocation and command structure.

=== Local ambulance service networks ===
==== Category 1 (General Manager – Assistant Commissioner) ====
- Metro North
- Metro South

==== Category 2 (General Manager – Assistant Commissioner) ====
- Cairns
- Darling Downs
- Gold Coast
- Sunshine Coast
- Townsville

==== Category 3 (Director – Chief Superintendent) ====
- Central Queensland

==== Category 4 (Director – Chief Superintendent) ====
- Mackay
- West Moreton
- Wide Bay

==== Category 5 (Executive Manager – Superintendent) ====
- Cape York and Torres Strait
- Central West
- North West
- South West

==== State Operations – Assistant Commissioner ====
- Seven Operations Centres (Cairns, Townsville, Rockhampton, Maroochydore, Toowoomba, Brisbane, Southport)

==== Headquarters ====
There are five key central office commands that divisions report to:

- Office of the Commissioner
- Office of the Deputy Commissioner State LASN Operations
- Office of the Deputy Commissioner Service Planning and Performance
- Office of the Deputy Commissioner Corporate Services
- Office of the Medical Director

These commands, plus some additional senior staff, form the Central Office Senior Executive (COSE), which in turn report to the QAS Board of Management (BoM).

=== Clinical operations ===
Following a redesign in 2014, the overall clinical governance of the service is ensured by the director of clinical quality and patient safety, currently filled by Chief Superintendent Tony Hucker ASM. The office ensures that patient care services provided by officers of the Queensland Ambulance Service are delivered at a consistently high standard, and that current clinical research is included within contemporary practice. The office also responsible for QAS Policy on Staff Health and Wellbeing and setting medical priorities for ambulance resource dispatch. There are a small number of medical officers, with the team led by Medical Director Dr Stephen Rashford ASM FACEM, who also holds the rank of deputy commissioner.

Ambulance operations of the Queensland Ambulance Service are performed predominantly by its own operational staff. QAS operational staff include student paramedics, advanced care paramedics (ACPs), critical care paramedics (formerly known as intensive care paramedics), patient transport officers (PTOs) and emergency medical dispatchers (EMDs). In some of Queensland's rural areas, QAS first responders provide emergency care until the arrival of paramedics, while in remote areas first responders may also work as volunteer drivers or operate ground transport vehicles (such as the Torres Strait). In some areas, non-QAS staff operate the QAS ambulances as unpaid volunteers, or as QHealth nurses as part of a hospital-based ambulance station, for example in Morven and Thargomindah.

Advanced care paramedics possess either a Diploma of Paramedical Science (Ambulance), a Bachelor of Paramedical Science, or equivalent qualifications. In addition to this, critical care paramedics possess a graduate diploma in intensive care paramedic practice, or very commonly a master's degree in emergency health. ACPs and CCPs attend medical, surgical and trauma emergencies. Patient transport officers possess a Certificate III in non-emergency patient transport or equivalent, and provide non-emergency patient transport services. Emergency medical dispatchers have completed a Certificate III in ambulance communications (call taking) and a Certificate IV in ambulance communications (dispatch) or equivalent. EMDs receive emergency calls and direct ambulance services to the emergency, and advise callers in performing first aid until the ambulance arrives on scene.

ACPs are competent in many emergency medical skills, including airway management (oropharyngeal and nasopharyngeal airway, oropharyngeal suctioning, laryngoscopy and Magill's forceps, laryngeal mask airway, intermittent positive pressure ventilation), cardiac management (cardiac monitoring – basic ECG interpretation and 12-lead ECG, manual defibrillation), drug/fluid administration (intramuscular injection, intravenous cannulation, fluid replacement), and the administration of basic and advanced drugs (aspirin, glucose, glyceryl trinitrate, adrenaline, morphine, fentanyl, etc.).

Critical care paramedics typically respond when an advanced level of clinical practice is required. In some areas, they will respond as a single officer in units known as 'pods'(priority only dispatch). CCP pods operate around the state, focused on metropolitan, major regional centers, or where a rescue helicopter is located. These ambulances are not equipped to transport patients, but contain much of the same equipment as a regular ambulance, as well as advanced equipment. CCPs are competent in all ACP procedures, as well as advanced emergency medical skills, such as endotracheal intubation, synchronised cardioversion, transcutaneous cardiac pacing, continuous positive airway pressure ventilation CPAP, decompression of tension pneumothorax, extra-jugular venous cannulation, procedural sedation (midazolam, ketamine, and droperidol.), pre-hospital thrombolysis (tenecteplase), pre-hospital direct referral to primary PCI, intraosseous access, as well as the administration of advanced drugs (atropine, heparin, ketamine, benztropine, magnesium, etc.). In addition to standard CCP skills, officers on the High Acute Response Unit (HARU) perform general anaesthesia via Rapid Sequence Induction, with the additional use of rocuronium and propofol, transfuse packed red blood cells, perform chest thoracostomy, and carry some additional pharmacology specific to major trauma such as TXA. As of 2018, there are HARU units located at Brisbane and the Gold Coast

== Vehicles ==
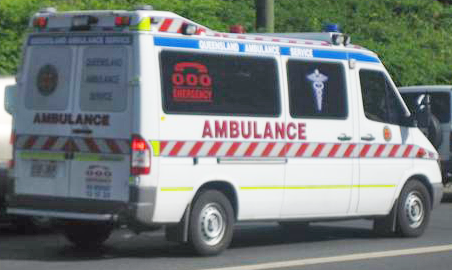
A QAS ambulance, in original livery.

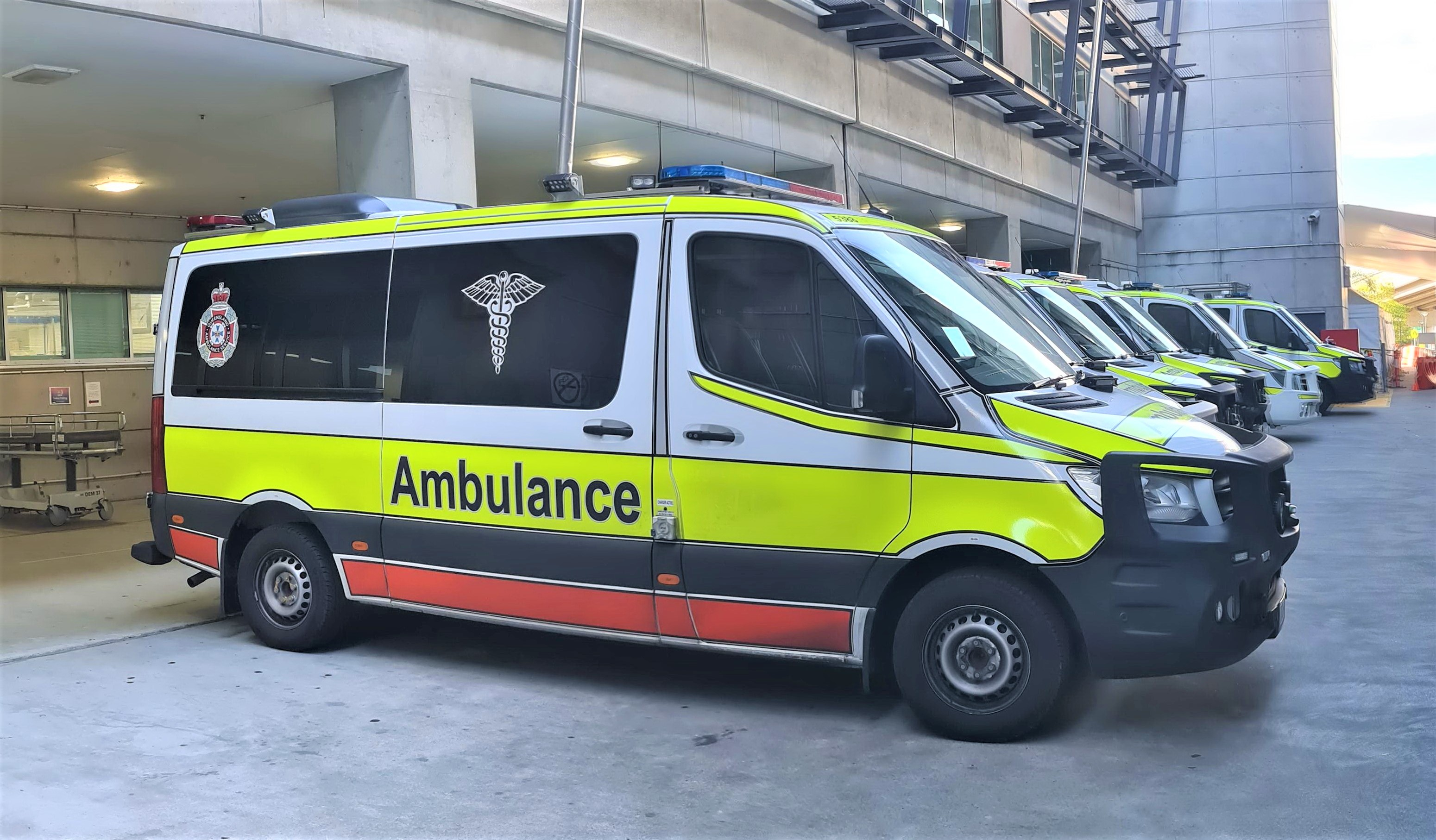
QAS road ambulance in new livery (Mercedes Benz Sprinter)

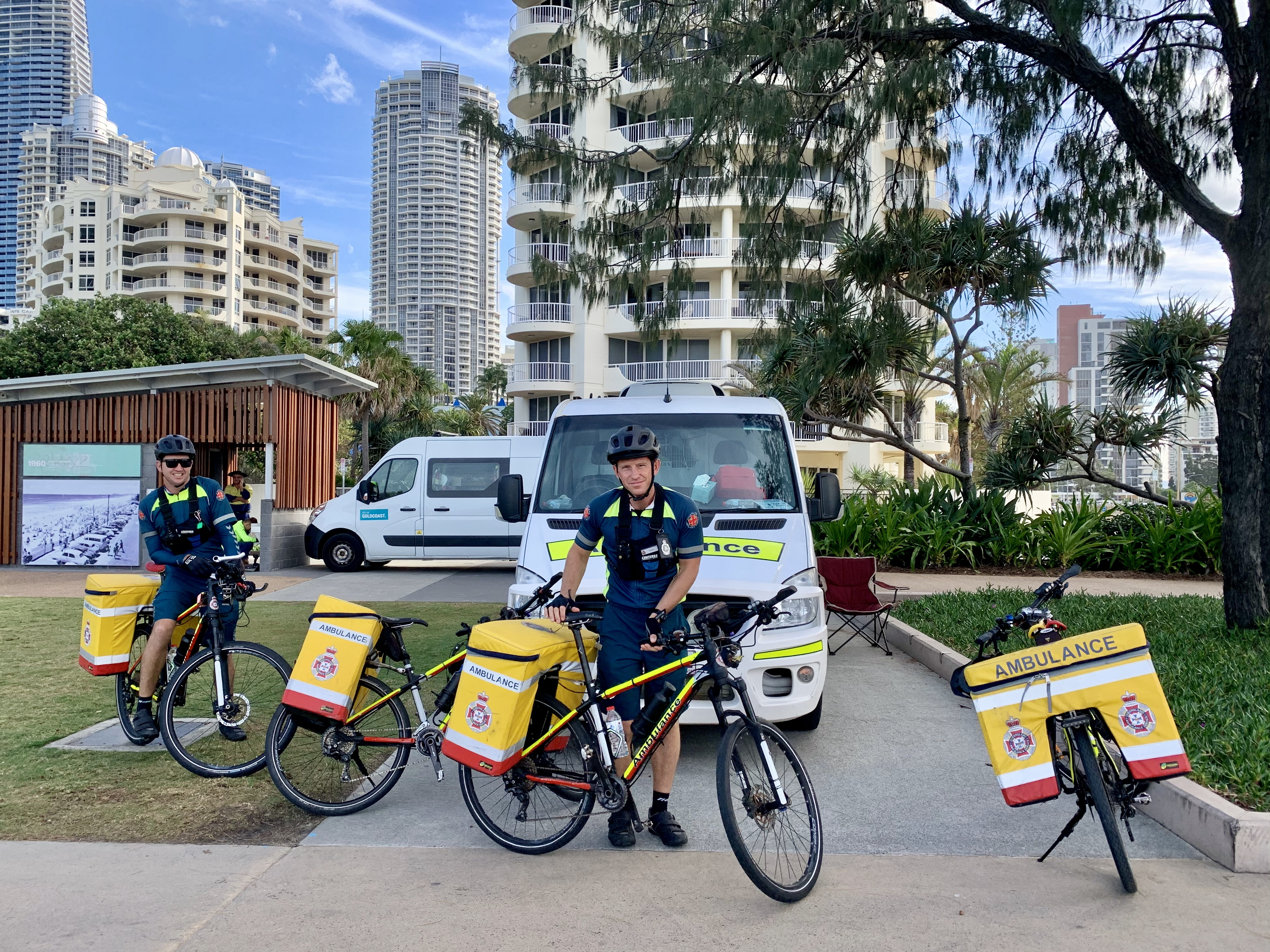
QAS Bicycle Response Team

The most common metropolitan ambulance are the Mercedes Benz Sprinters. In rural areas, due to the need for extra traction or rough roads, 4x4 vehicles are common,

based upon a Toyota Landcruiser Cab Chassis (1+1 modular 4x4s) or Toyota Landcruiser Troopcarrier. QAS has also trialed a Mercedes-Benz G-Class as a 4x4 ambulance. All 4x4s carry one stretcher patient in addition to the normal equipment found on a typical Mercedes Sprinter. These vehicles (Mercedes Sprinters) are used by both advanced care paramedics (ACPs) and patient transport officers. The acute vehicles carry one stretcher and the patient transport vehicles Mercedes Sprinters carry two. Toyota Hiace PTO vehicles with twin stretchers are also in use around the State, along with a variety of other transport vehicles including wheel-chair vehicles. Additionally, two stretcher Mercedes 519 acute ambulances operate around the state by ACP and CCPs, particularly in regional and rural areas. Critical care paramedics (formerly known as ICPs) and station OIC's now often drive Isuzu MUX's (formerly using Hyundai Santa Fe's and Subaru Foresters). These vehicles cannot carry patients, however they carry much of the same equipment as the Sprinters, as well as specialised equipment, with their sole purpose serving as fast response vehicles. Local Area Referral Unit or Low Acuity Response Unit (LARU) vehicles, generally Volkswagen Transporters or Hyundai iLoads, carry medical equipment for minor injuries such as broken arms, strains and sprains. They are unable to transport patients, and are not fitted with lights or sirens.

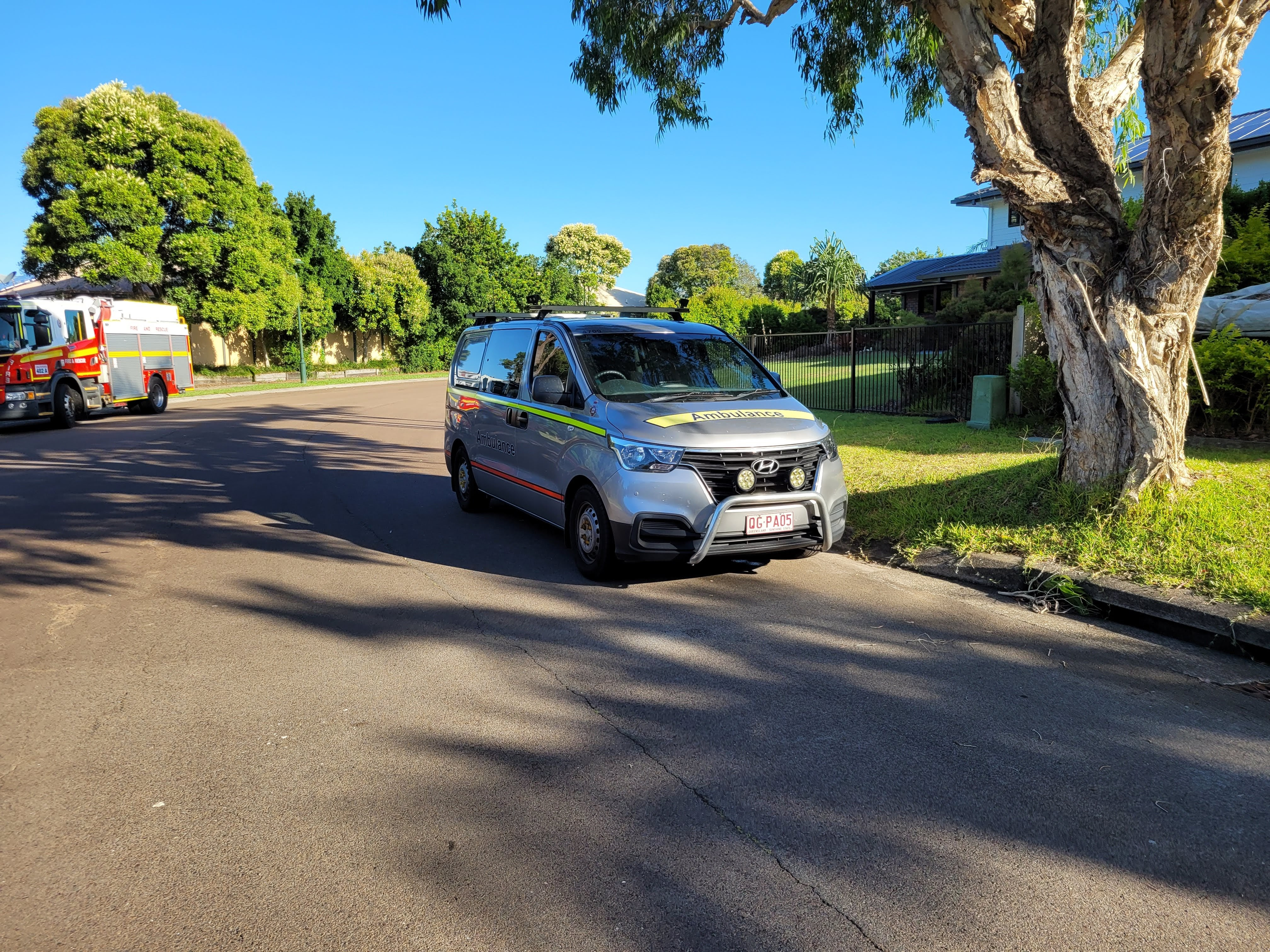
Low Acuity Response Unit van

A station's officer in charge (OIC) or area supervisors often use dual-cab Utes, serving a similar purpose to other fast response vehicles.

Previously, the QAS used Ford F-series truck (Ford F-250 and F-350) until Ford stopped importing these in 2008. The last Ford ambulance in use by the QAS was decommissioned in 2021.

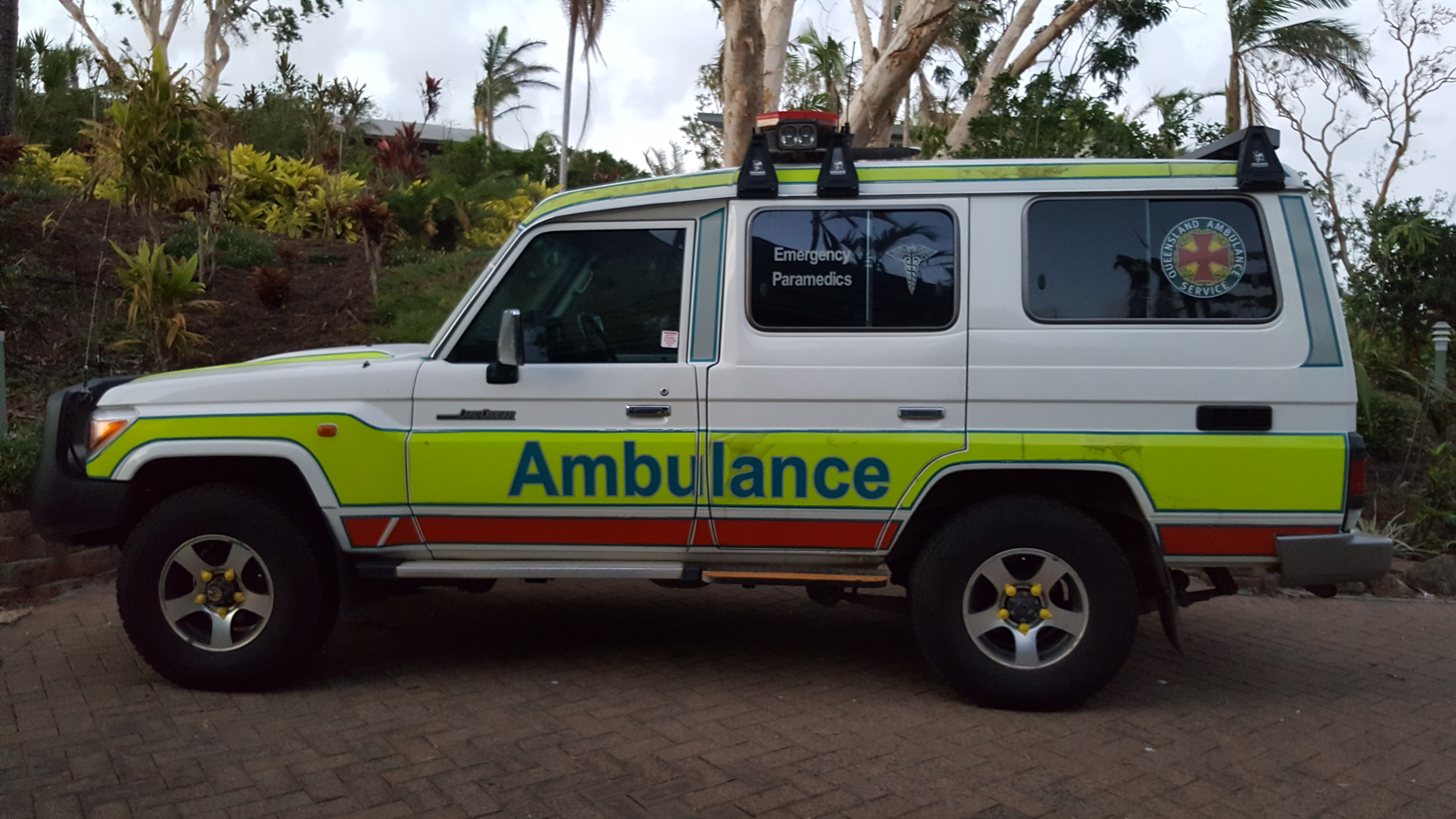
QAS 4x4 Ambulance (Toyota Landcruiser Troop Carrier configuration)

=== Fixed Wing Retrieval Operations ===
Fixed wing aeromedical retrieval in Queensland is provided by the Royal Flying Doctor Service (Queensland Section) and LifeFlight Australia. This is done in conjunction with Queensland Ambulance and Queensland Health.

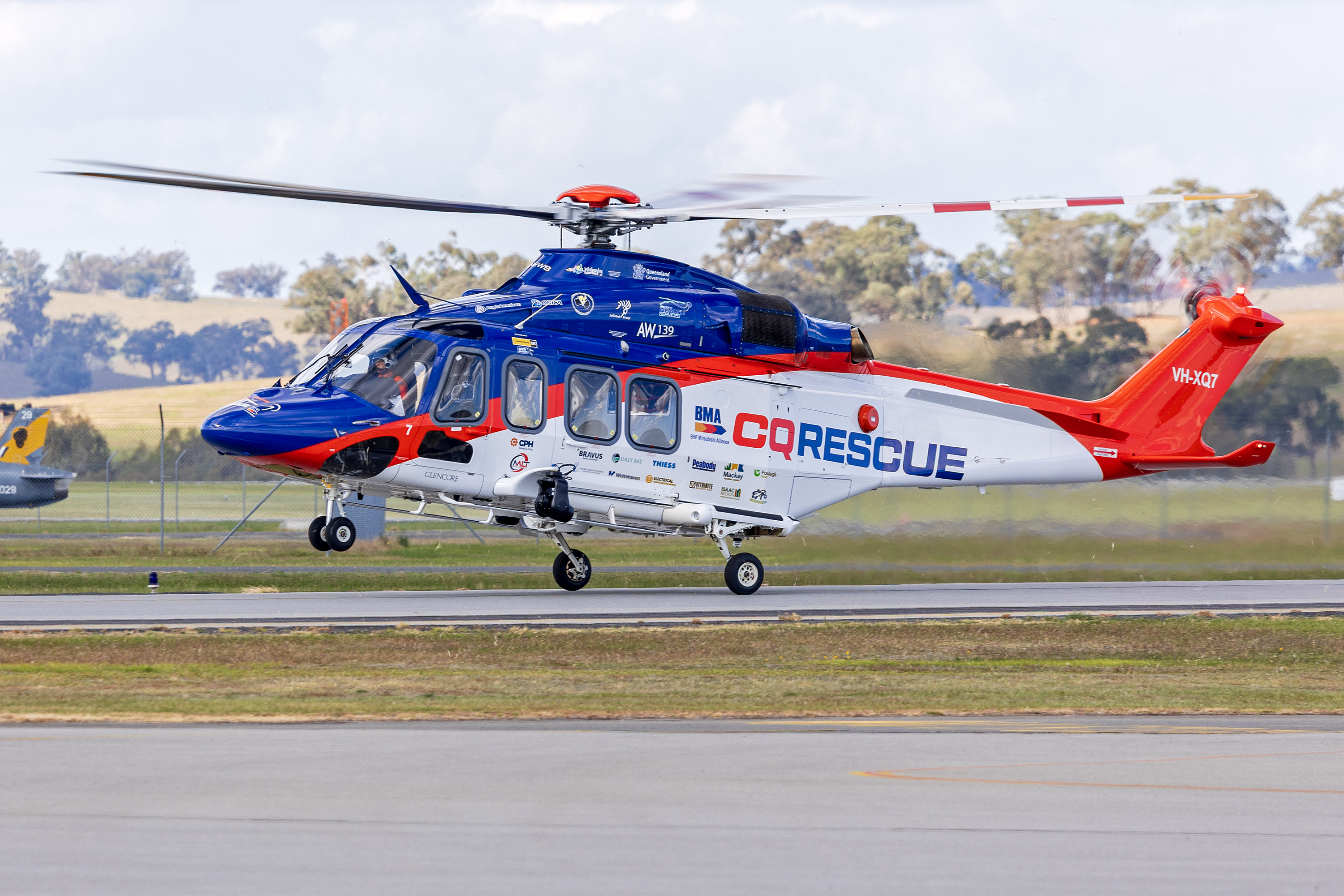
CQ Rescue VH-XQ7 AW139

=== Rotary Wing Retrieval Operations ===
Helicopter retrieval incorporates both pre-hospital rescue and interhospital transfer services across Queensland and has done so since 1979. Queensland Health contracts six medical rescue providers to provide emergency air rescue and air transfer services. Each contractor is designated a region of Queensland and has the option of providing more than one helicopter to their region. Each helicopter is typically staffed with:

- 1 × pilot
- 1 × aircrewman
- 1 × rescue crewman (rescue swimmer)
- 1 × QAS critical care paramedic
- 1 × Queensland Health Department-contracted doctor

(Crew mix can vary from base to base and between differing tasks such as SAR, neonatal transfer, doctor/nurse model on IFT helicopter, etc.). Helicopters staffed with both a QAS Critical Care Paramedic AND Flight Doctor also have the option to respond to incidents via road in the CCP's response vehicle if necessary.

Helicopters operate from Brisbane, Townsville and Cairns (Rescue 500, 521, 510 (3 AW139's and 2 Bell 412's which are provided by Air Services Public Safety Business Agency (Queensland Government Air Rescue QGAir while a contracted government rescue helicopter operates from Thursday Island (Rescue 700) called Torres Strait & NPA Rescue (Bell 412). The remainder of the helicopter rescue services are divided into Community Rescue Services (a contract between the community and PSBA), and independent/commercial models that provide part (Roma) community hours in addition to their commercial obligations, or complete community hours (Mt ISA).

CQ Rescue out of Mackay (Rescue 401) operates 2 AW139's, one main and the other as a back-up and RACQ Capricorn Helicopter Rescue out of Rockhampton (Rescue 300 Bell 412).

LifeFlight Australia operates community helicopter rescue services at:

- Brisbane (1 AW139)
- Bundaberg (1 Bell 412)
- Sunshine Coast (1 Bell 412)
- Toowoomba (1 Bell 412 & 1 AW139)
- Mount Isa (1 BK-117)

LifeFlight Australia also operates commercial contract helicopters at Surat Gas Aero-Medical Service out of Roma and Toowoomba, which can be tasked to provide community assistance if available. LifeFlight also has an inter-facility (hospital transfer) AW139 based at Archerfield that is primarily for the transfer of critically ill patients between hospitals in Southern Queensland and Northern New South Wales.

Additionally LifeFlight provide doctors for all rescue helicopters, and most Royal Flying Doctor Service planes (except Mount Isa).

== Funding ==
From 2003, the service was funded by the Community Ambulance Cover scheme, a levy added to all customers of electricity retailers in Queensland.

In 2009, the amount payable was a flat fee just above $100 annually. This amount and collection method is designed to provide a reliable flow of income to the service.

On 1 July 2011, the levy was abolished, with funding now directly provided by the Queensland Government.

== Ranks ==
Within the Queensland Ambulance Service, operational ranks refer more to the scope of practice that they are legally able to perform, rather than a chain of command hierarchy. With the exception of the medical officer role, any rank higher than Critical Care Paramedic no longer has additional skills, and therefore does follow a chain of command hierarchy.

Medical officers have the ability to give legal permission for paramedics to perform medical procedures that are not performed normally under Queensland Ambulance Service practice guidelines.

The ranks feature from lowest to highest.

=== Support ===
- Patient transport officer – One silver bar over 'PTO'
- Emergency medical dispatcher – One silver lightning bolt with the words Ambulance Communications
- Senior emergency medical dispatcher – One silver lightning bolt with the words Senior Ambulance Communications

=== Paramedic ===
- Paramedic – Silver Caduceus. In rare usage in rural areas.
- Graduate advanced care paramedic – Red Caduceus.
- Advanced care paramedic level one – Red Caduceus over one red bar.
- Advanced care paramedic level two – Red Caduceus over two red bars.
- Senior advanced care paramedic – Red Caduceus over the words 'Senior Paramedic'
- Critical care paramedic – One gold Caduceus (formerly intensive care paramedic)
- Senior critical care paramedic – One gold Caduceus with the words 'Senior Paramedic' (formerly intensive care paramedic)
- Medical Officer – One gold Caduceus with the words 'Medical Officer' (specially appointed emergency & retrieval doctors who work in the High Acuity Response Unit)

=== Classified officers ===
- Supervisors – Two pips; they act as: officer-in-charge, clinical educator, clinical support officer, and operations centre supervisor.
- Team leader – Inspector – Three pips; they act as: senior operations supervisor, clinical deployment supervisor, senior educator and some specialist roles.
- Chief Inspector – A single crown; they act as; clinical managers; workforce planning managers.
- Superintendent – One pip under a single crown; they act as: executive managers
- Chief superintendent – Two pips under a single crown; they act as: directors and directors- operations
- Assistant Commissioner – Caduceus surrounded by a gold wreath with a red background; they act as: regional executives, general managers and key executive positions.
- Deputy Commissioner – Caduceus surrounded by a gold wreath with a red background under a single gold pip. They act as: executive directors, and the rank of the medical director.
- Commissioner – Caduceus surrounded by a gold wreath with a red background under a single gold crown

== Notable people ==
- Don Featherstone, ambulance officer, Queensland Ambulance Transport Brigade, Toowoomba

== See also ==
- New South Wales Ambulance
- Health in Australia
- Paramedics in Australia
