= Queensland Fire Department =

State fire and emergency service in Queensland, Australia

Department overview
- Formed: 1 July 2024
- Jurisdiction: Queensland Government
- Headquarters: Kedron, Queensland, Australia
- Employees: 2,200 full time fire fighters; 2,000 paid auxiliary fire fighters; 27,000 volunteers across 1426 brigades
- Annual budget: $987.4 million AUD (2024–25)
- Minister responsible: Ann Leahy, Minister for Fire, Disaster Recovery and Volunteers
- Department executives: Steve Smith, Commissioner; Kevin Walsh, QFR; Ben Millington, Acting RFSQ Chief Officer
- Child agencies: Queensland Fire and Rescue; Rural Fire Service Queensland
- Website: fire.qld.gov.au

The Queensland Fire Department (QFD) is the primary provider of fire and rescue services in Queensland, Australia. The QFD was established on the 1st of July, 2024, and has committed to a refocus on firefighting operations after the organisational change from QFES. The QFD’s headquarters are located at the Emergency Services Complex in Kedron, Brisbane.

In 2021, personnel included 2,600 full-time fire fighters and 2,000 on-call auxiliary firefighters, and approximately 26,000 (16 000 Non operational and 9 000 operational) Rural fire Service volunteers.

The Queensland Government minister responsible for QFD is the Minister for Fire, Disaster Recovery and Volunteers, currently the Honourable Ann Leahy.

== History ==
On 1 November 2013, the Queensland Fire and Rescue Service merged with Emergency Management Queensland (EMQ) and the Corporate Services Division of the Department of Community Safety to become the QFES, encompassing Queensland Fire and Rescue Service, parts of the State Emergency Service, Emergency Management and the Rural Fire Service.

In October 2022, following a review by the honourable Minister Mark Ryan, it was decided QFES would be dissolved in June 2024. The Queensland Fire and Emergency Service would become the Queensland Fire Department, with Queensland Fire and Rescue and the Rural Fire Service as part of its structure, and a new central headquarters for the QFD.

On Monday 3 June 2024, the State Emergency Service (SES) was moved to the Queensland Police Service; along with the Volunteer Marine Rescue and the Australian Volunteer Coast Guard Queensland, becoming part of the new Marine Rescue Queensland (MRQ).

The QFD headquarters will be located at 240 Sandgate Road, Albion, Brisbane, with a 2025 opening date.

== Organisation ==
QFD is an organisation which provides fire and rescue services within the state of Queensland. Queensland Fire and Rescue (QFR) is the primary agency, and covers the cities and urban regions. Rural Fire Service Queensland (RFSQ) consists largely of volunteers, and provides bushfire response outside the main population centres.

QFR stations are located in cities and regional towns and their primary duty is responding to fires and rescues requiring specialist equipment utilised by QFR. Other primary duties of QFR firefighters are to respond to hazardous materials, technical rescues, and interagency requests for assistance.

Rural Fire Brigades are mainly located in rural and remote areas of the state. Primarily, the RFSQ responds to bushfires and carries out hazard reduction burns and community education programs regarding fire safety. Brigades may also receive limited road crash rescue training, and a small amount of remote brigades also have the capacity to respond to structure fires. They often partner with other government and private agencies as well as landholders to carry out bush firefighting, bushfire prevention, and community education activities.

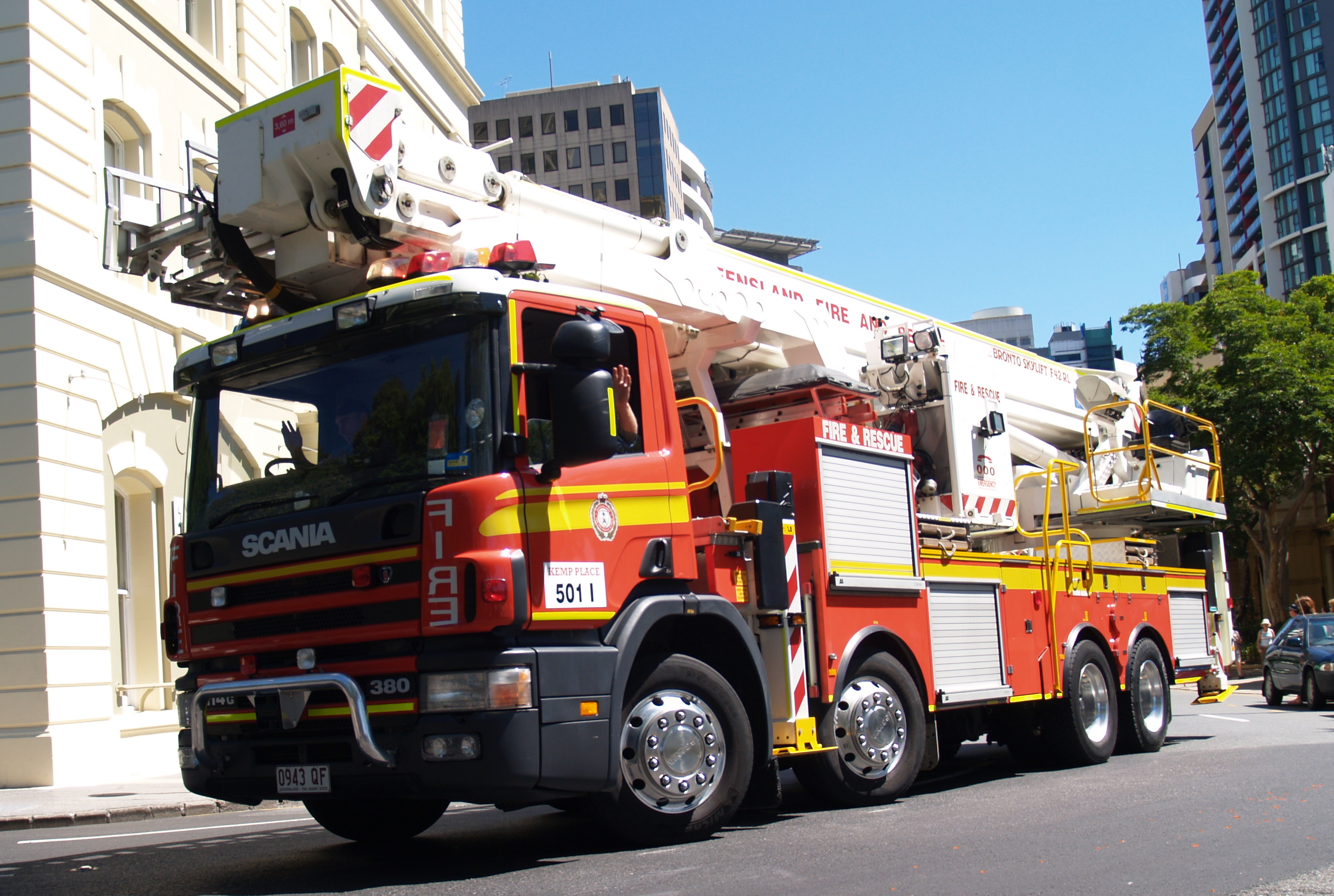
Aerial ladder truck

=== Rural Fire Service ===
- Rural Fire Board 1927–1931
- Rural Fire Board 1948–1990
- Rural Fire Service Queensland 1990–present

The first Rural Fire Board was established in 1927 with the Rural Fires Act of 1927 (Qld), and suspended in 1931 due to the Great Depression. The boards were re-established in 1948, and merged with the Department of Emergency Services in 1990, becoming the Rural Fire Service (RFS). In 2014, the RFS was incorporated into QFES.
