= Emergency medical services in Australia =

State and territory ambulance services

Pre-hospital emergency services in Australia are provided by government ambulance services or contracted by government health departments. With the exception of Western Australia and the Northern Territory, ambulance services are provided by a state or territory government agency. In Western Australia and the Northern Territory, health and well-being charity St John Ambulance is contracted by government to provide ambulance services.

== Organisations ==
Ambulance services in Australia are largely considered part of the Australian public health system, but are not typically provided for free like public hospital services. In most states and territories, ambulance service providers are funded by charging for services or through membership fees. Residents of Queensland and Tasmania are eligible for free ambulance services nation-wide, with these states funding care through a separate emergency services levy or consolidated government funds. In Western Australia and Northern Territory, the state/territory health department contracts out ambulance service to the local St John charity.

Ambulance providers per jurisdiction
State or territory	Ambulance service provider
Queensland	Queensland Ambulance Service
New South Wales	NSW Ambulance
Australian Capital Territory	ACT Ambulance Service
Victoria	Ambulance Victoria
Tasmania	Ambulance Tasmania
South Australia	SA Ambulance Service
Western Australia	St John Western Australia
Northern Territory	St John Northern Territory

== Capabilities ==
=== Road ambulance ===
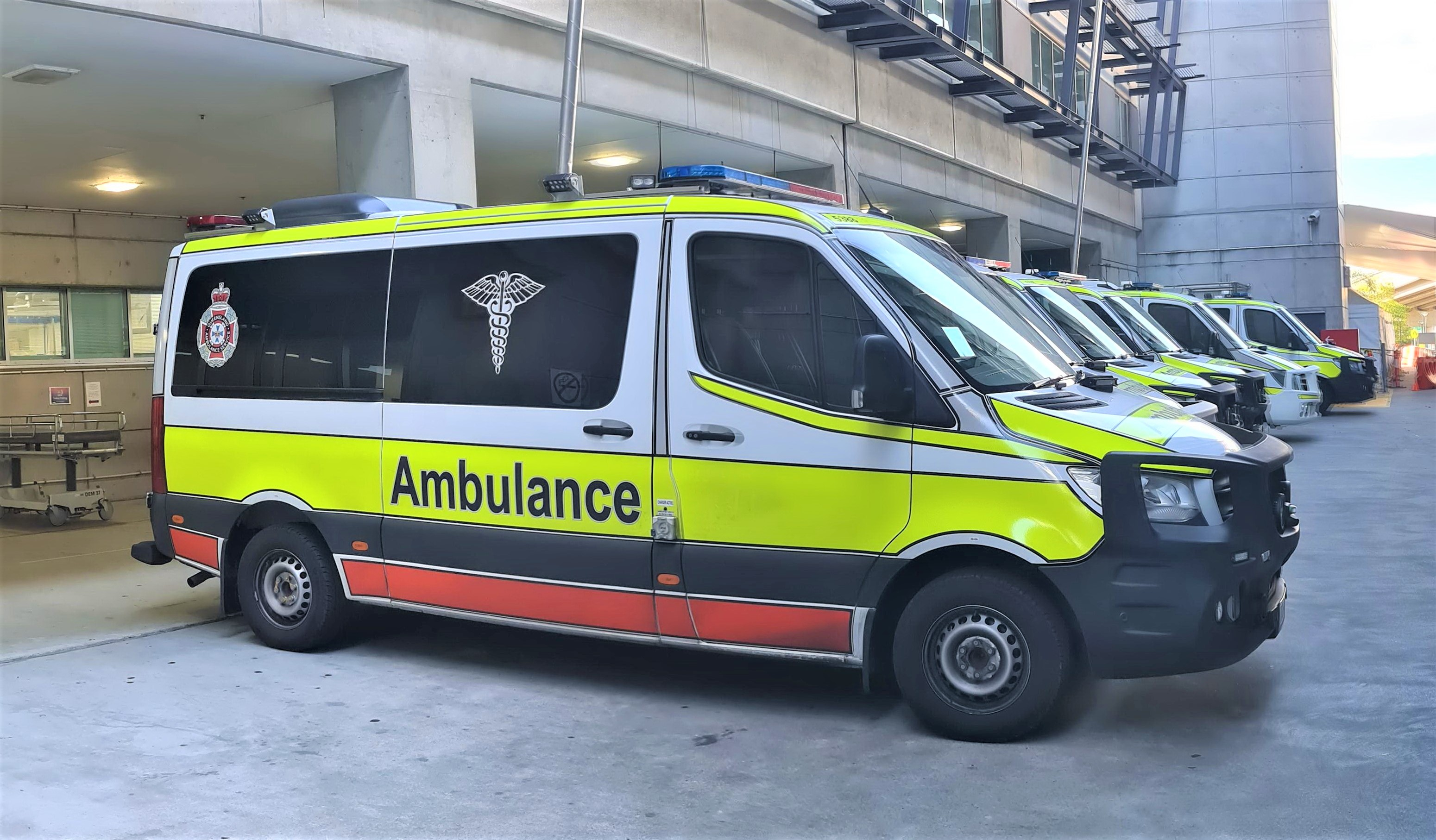
Queensland Ambulance Service road vehicle

Ambulance service within Australia can be divided into two basic groups: the statutory services and volunteer groups. In all Australian states, with the exception of Western Australia, and in the Northern Territory, statutory ambulance services are provided by the state/territorial government, as a single-entity, third-service model, government department. In Western Australia, and in the Northern Territory, all statutory ambulance service is provided by St John Ambulance Australia, under contract to the state/territorial government. In all other states and territories, the activities of St John Ambulance are all limited to first aid training and special events support, with the occasional disaster response. In all states with the exception of Queensland and Tasmania, users who are not on welfare benefits are billed directly for their usage of an ambulance. In addition, while not strictly ambulance services, some jurisdictions also have private companies offering medical transportation services on a fee-for-service basis. Ambulance services in Australia operate on the Anglo-American (as opposed to the Franco-German) EMS service delivery model.

=== Air medical retrieval and rescue ===
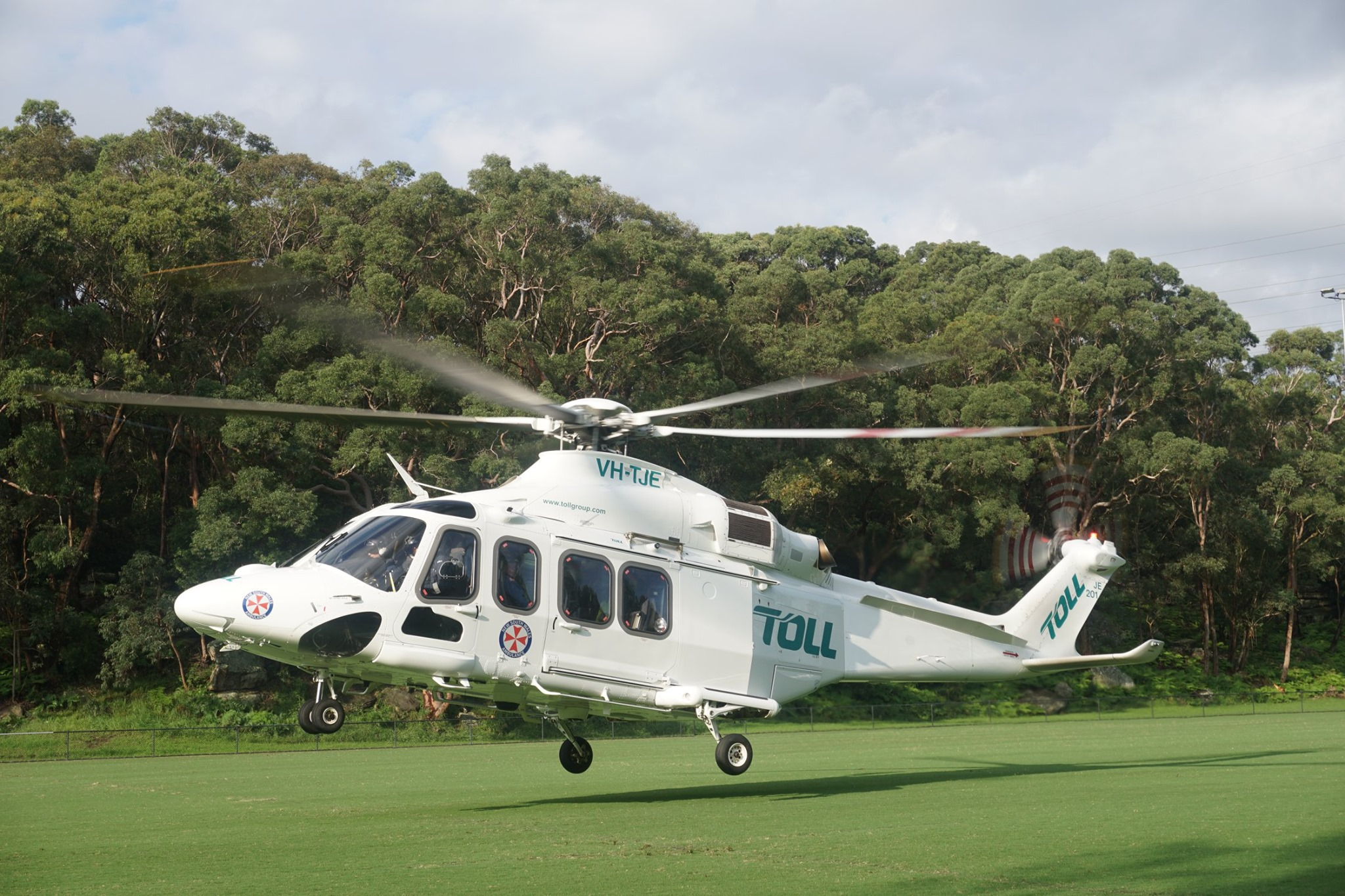
NSW Ambulance rescue helicopter

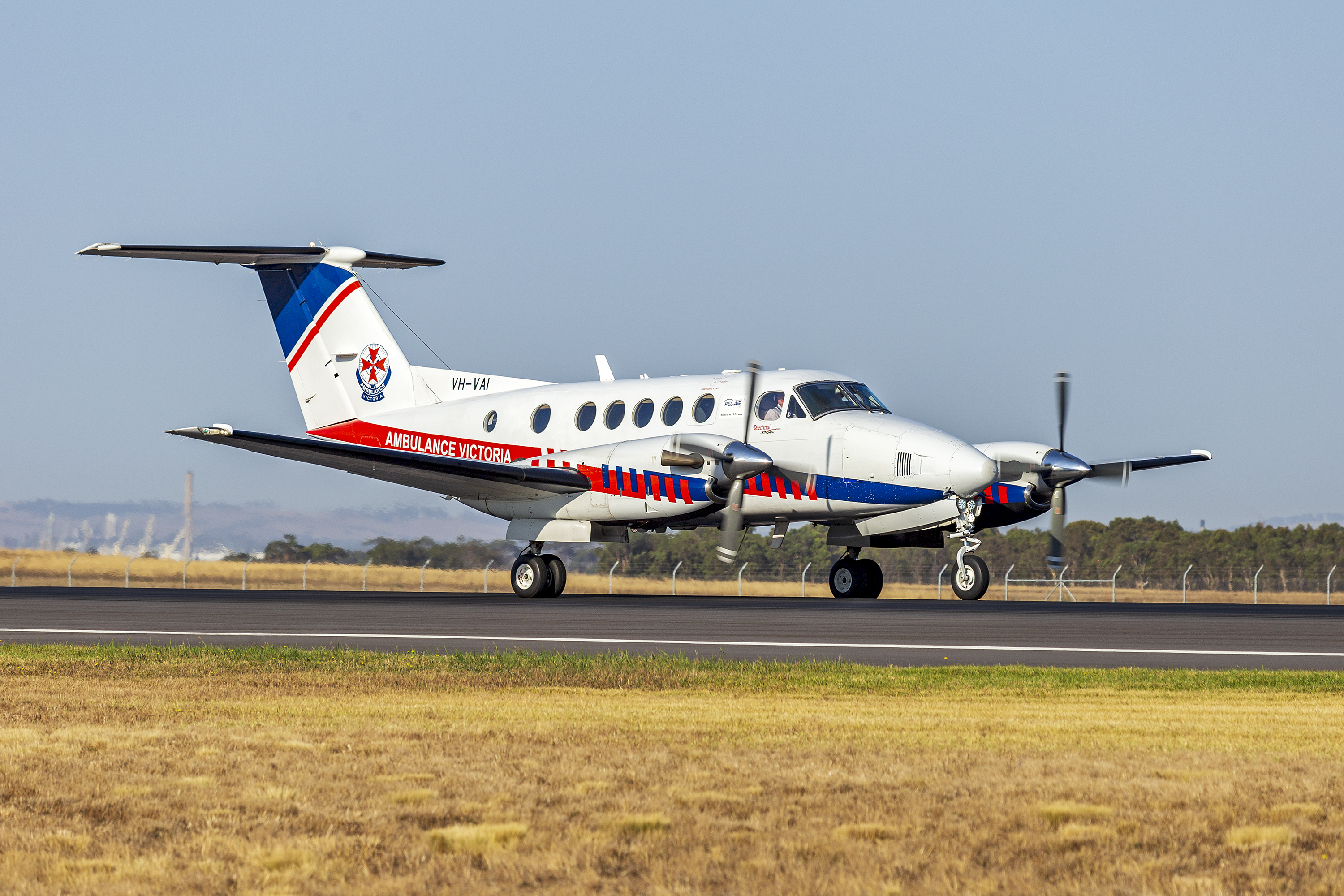
Ambulance Victoria aeromedical retrieval aircraft

Air ambulance service is accomplished in Australia by means of a variety of arrangements and providers. In New South Wales rescue helicopters are split into two districts with Westpac Rescue Helicopter Service and Toll Air Ambulance servicing the entire state. The Sydney-based Westpac Rescue Helicopter is solely used for search and rescue taskings. Some states, such as Queensland share air ambulance resources with other public agencies; in the case of Queensland, air ambulance services are primarily provided by Emergency Management Queensland (EMQ Helicopter Rescue) and a mixture of other providers such as LifeFlight Australia, RACQ CQ Rescue, RACQ Capricorn Helicopter Rescue, RACQ NQ Rescue and AGL Action Rescue Helicopter may fill service gaps. In other states, such as South Australia a mix of service providers, including other emergency services such as the police, continue to operate but medical crews are provided by MedStar, a government entity which provide doctors, nurses and flight paramedics to MAC Rescue (Helicopter) and RFDS (Fixed Wing). While helicopters provide good service in coastal areas with high population density, in the more sparsely settled interior, distances can be vast, and fixed-wing aircraft are the preferred mode of transport. In these cases, the statutory ambulance services often operate the aircraft, in cooperation with Australia's Royal Flying Doctor Service.

=== First responders ===
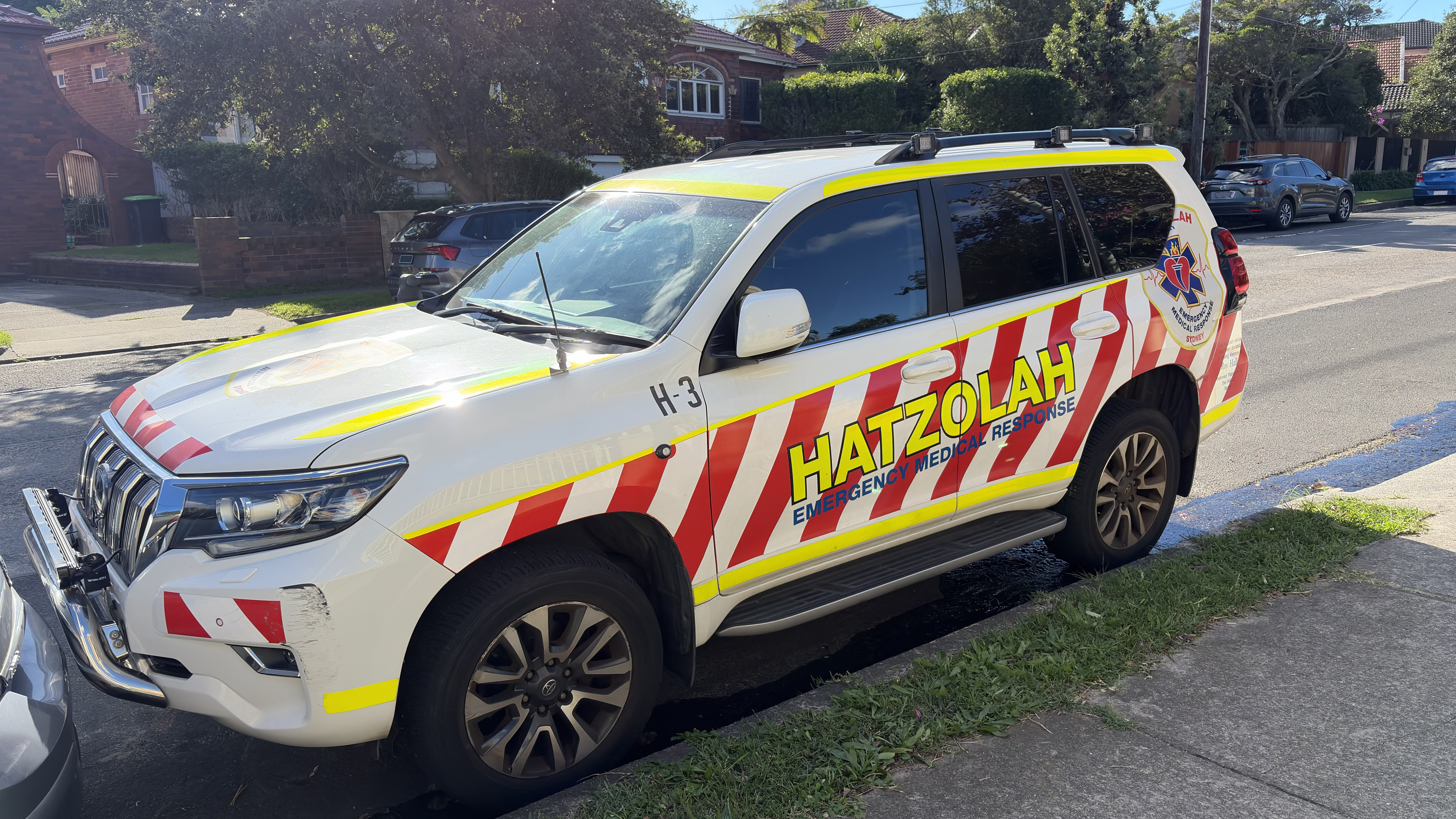
A Hatzolah vehicle in Vaucluse, Sydney

There are a number of different first responders in Australia that supplement ambulance services. First responders provide a rapid response to the scene but do not transport patients, and comprises volunteer and statutory services.

- Many metropolitan ambulance services have single paramedics in vehicles and on motorcycles.
- In Melbourne and Sydney, Hatzolah provides first responders in large Jewish communities as an adjunct to state government ambulance services.
- Since 1998 in Melbourne, the Metropolitan Fire Service respond to suspected cardiac or respiratory arrest medical emergencies
- In rural South Australia some towns have Community Emergency Response Teams such as Port McDonnell and Marion Bay and historically Meadows.
- From 30 December 2020, New South Wales Ambulance have been dispatching a number of emergency services (including the State Emergency Service) alongside NSW Ambulance to suspected cardiac or respiratory arrest medical emergencies where under the Public Access Defibrillation (PAD) program.

=== Firefighter Emergency Medical Responders ===
In Melbourne the Metropolitan Fire Brigade, Melbourne (MFB) provides a fully professional Emergency Medical Response (EMR) capability for the metropolitan fire district. Commencing in 1998 the MFB's EMR program is run in partnership with Ambulance Victoria (AV) to ensure rapid trained response to Computer-aided Dispatch (CAD) "priority 0" (suspected cardiac or respiratory arrest) medical emergencies across Melbourne.

==== Training ====
To qualify as a Firefighter Emergency Medical Responder, MFB professional firefighters undertake a 12-month training program provided by Monash University following a training curriculum developed specifically for professional firefighters by the MFB and Monash University Faculty of Community Emergency Health & Paramedic Practice. MFB Firefighters are trained to provide basic life support care including oxygen resuscitation and airway management, CPR, defibrillation, spinal and trauma care. When required, firefighters may also provide assistance to ambulance paramedics.

==== Programme benefits ====
Under the EMR program, MFB firefighters are simultaneously dispatched with AV paramedics to all priority 0 medical emergencies within the metropolitan fire district. In 60% of these EMR events, MFB firefighters arrive first on scene and commence initial patient assessment and provide care as required. On arrival, AV paramedics take over responsibility for patient care with MFB firefighters then providing assistance as required. As a result of EMR response, two minutes have been cut from the response time to cardiac arrest cases in the metropolitan fire district covered by the MFB. This program and the expansion of emergency and MICA ambulance services in Melbourne in recent years is providing the Melbourne community with a higher cardiac arrest survival rate than other Australian capital cities. Due to the reported success of this program it has been expanded to include some full-time stations run by Victoria's Country Fire Authority. The NSW Government has recently proposed a similar program utilising Fire and Rescue NSW but has faced strong opposition from the Fire Brigade Employees Union.

== Standards ==
=== Workforce ===
Ambulance services in Australia use a majoritiy paid workforce, primarily consisting of tertiary-educated Registered Paramedics, vocationally-trained technicians and officers, and in some rural areas, a local workforce of volunteer community responders. Since 2018, paramedicine has been a nationally regulated profession with minimum education standards, while non-paramedic positions remain at the discretion of the ambulance service. The level of training for volunteers is considered to be a high level of skill at advanced first aid and basic life support.

The preferred level of entry into practice for new paramedics is a multi-year, bachelor's degree program in either Emergency Health, Paramedicine or Clinical Practice (Paramedic), including classroom lectures, clinical practice, and internship components. The intent is to make this qualification the only path of entry into the field but so far only the states of Victoria and Tasmania have phased out all other methods of entry. Ambulance services in South Australia and Queensland now draw the majority of their paramedics from degree programs and continue to use the older-style, internal diploma programs only to fill service gaps and shortages in forecasted requirements. These older programs continue to be necessary to ensure ambulance services are able to directly train additional staff to fill shortages and as the numbers of degree graduate paramedics being produced by the university system are insufficient to meet ambulance services' requirements for new employees. NSW Ambulance is transitioning to tertiary entrance but this process will be phased in over several years and may be achieved by 2020.

Training as a Mobile Intensive Care Ambulance Paramedic in Victoria, and equivalent Critical or Intensive Care Paramedic programs in other states, involves the completion of a post-graduate certificate program. The program, which typically takes an additional year to complete, involves theory, clinical and supervised practice components. Graduates possess an expanded skill set which may include Rapid Sequence Intubation (RSI), additional drugs, and in some cases, certification of death.

=== Vehicles ===
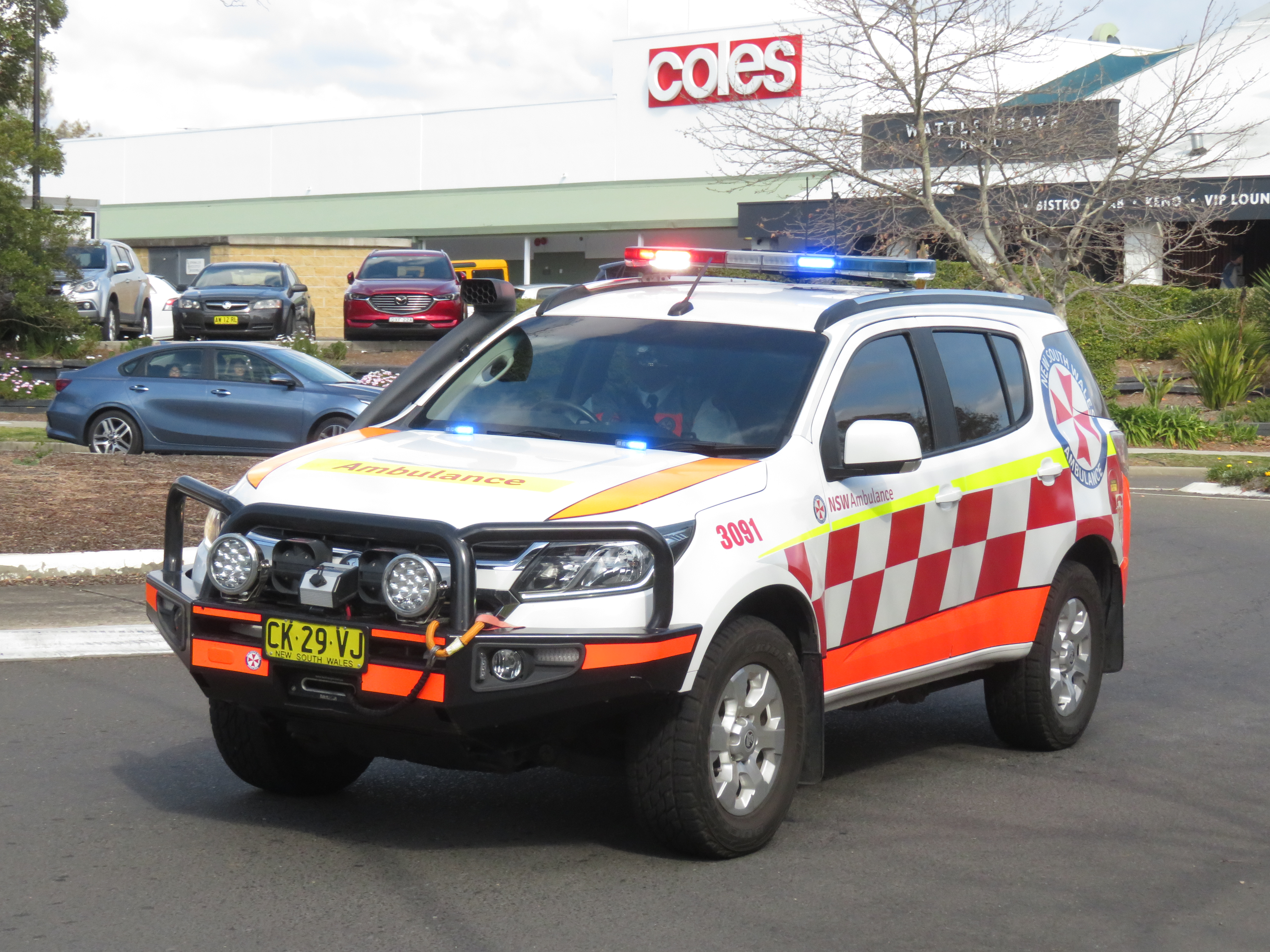
NSW Ambulance Holden Trailblazer Supervisor Vehicle

Ambulance services in Australia provide emergency medical services by means of a number of service delivery methods. These include both conventional ambulances and aircraft, but also include a variety of rapid response vehicles with single paramedics, including both all-wheel drive type vehicles (SUVs) and motorcycles. Supervisory vehicles are also equipped with medical equipment, and capable of providing first response service, when required. Some services, most notably New South Wales, provided the statutory rescue service in addition to their role in pre-hospital care, this has recently changed however, ASNSW Rescue Units are currently in the process of being disbanded with their rescue duties and resources being reassigned to the NSW Fire Brigade. There is no national standard for the design of conventional ambulances in Australia. All ambulance services have their vehicles built to their own internal specifications. That being said, Australia's ambulances are roughly similar from one state to another with the majority of general paramedic/intensive care ambulances in Australia being based on the Mercedes Sprinter which are upgraded every three years. They all generally comply with the European Standard CEN 1789 as published by the European Committee for Standards, apart from the visual identity provisions. This compliance is, however, incidental.

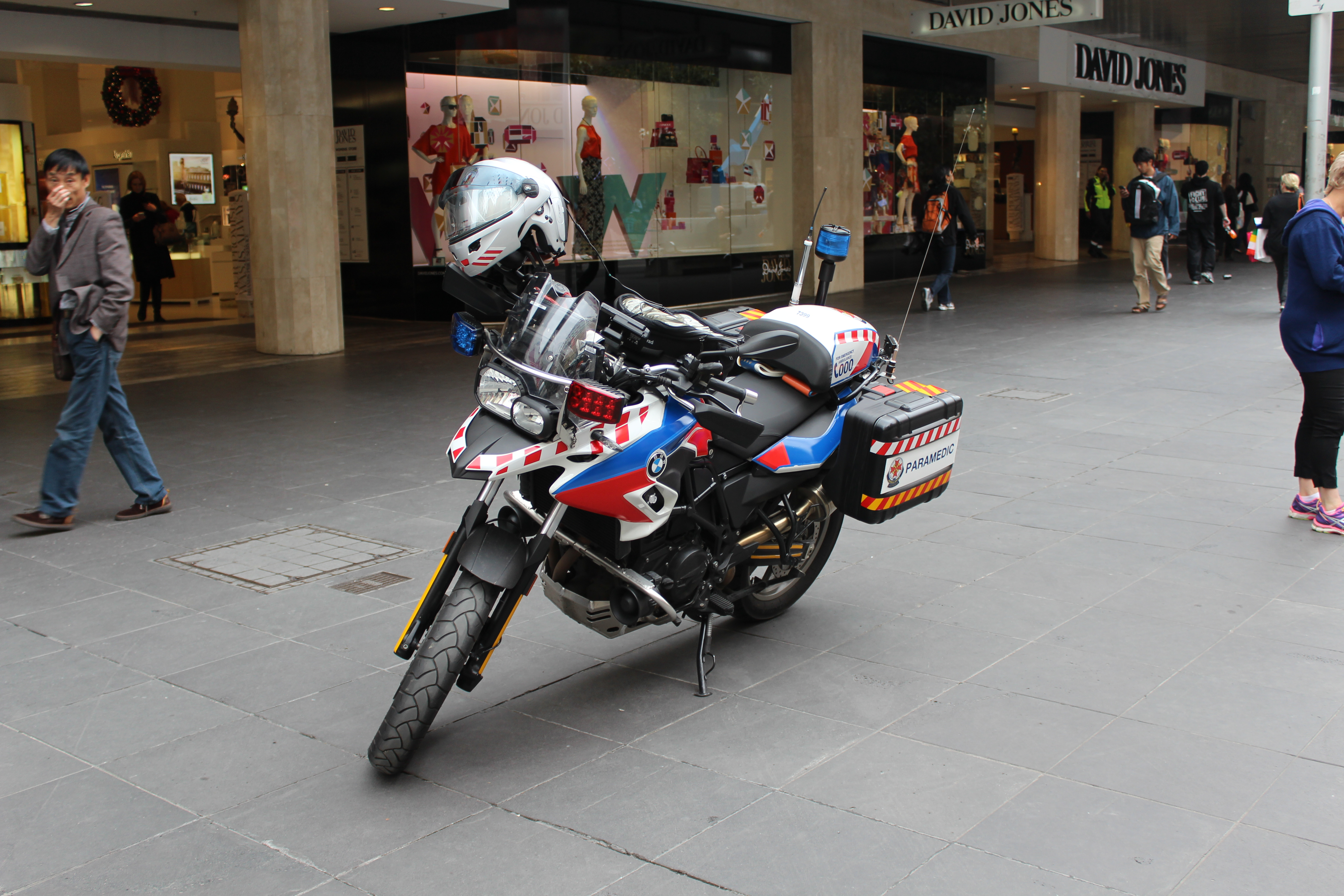
Ambulance Victoria Single Paramedic Motorcycle in Bourke Street Mall

=== Dispatch ===
Ambulances and paramedics in Australia are centrally dispatched by operations centres in each state and territory. Australia's national emergency number is 000. This number rings at one of the Telstra Emergency Service Access Points, where a Telstra operator directs the caller to the appropriate emergency service (police, fire, ambulance) for the state and territory. Callers then speak to an operator at a dispatch centre, managed by the relevant state ambulance service or may even speak to an individual officer in the case of rural/remote stations. Dispatch technologies, including automated vehicle locating (AVL) and decision-support software are either identical (as with MPDS and computer-aided dispatch) or comparable with those found in North America and Europe.

=== Response times ===
Australian ambulance services generally publicise a response time standard of around 10 minutes on high priority emergency calls. Ongoing monitoring suggests that compliance is improving, many "code one" (immediately life threatening) calls are reached well within 10 minutes.

== See also ==
- Health care in Australia
