= St John Ambulance New South Wales =

First-air charity organization

St John Ambulance NSW
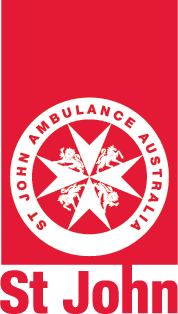
- Abbreviation: SJANSW
- Formation: 1883; 143 years ago
- Type: Charitable organisation Limited company
- Headquarters: Macquarie Park, New South Wales
- Location: New South Wales
- Official language: English
- Commissioner: Ilan Lowbeer CStJ (Commissioner)
- Key people: Larissa Cook (Chairman); Jason Heffernan AFSM (CEO); Ben Tory OAM MStJ (Deputy Commissioner - Metro); Helen Chant OStJ (Deputy Commissioner - Regional); Andrew Craig MStJ (Deputy Commissioner - Clinical Systems ) Marian Casey MStJ (Deputy Commissioner - Strategy); Nicola Bailey MStJ (Deputy Commissioner - Youth)
- Parent organisation: St John Ambulance Australia
- Affiliations: Order of St John
- Staff: 150
- Volunteers: 2,800
- Website: www.stjohnnsw.com.au

St John Ambulance New South Wales (St John NSW or SJNSW) is a charitable organisation dedicated to helping people in sickness, distress, suffering or danger. It provides first aid training, event and community health services, as well as community care programs. SJNSW is the state branch of St John Ambulance Australia in New South Wales.

== History of St John Ambulance ==
In the 19th century, the Order of St John was revived in England, inspired by the Knights of St John's historical dedication to providing care and shelter for pilgrims and crusaders. This revival aimed to perpetuate these traditions.

In 1877, St John Ambulance was established to translate humanitarian ideals into action within the evolving industrial society. Focused on promoting first aid for the sick and wounded, the organisation relied on volunteer efforts. The initiative extended globally with the establishment of St John Ambulance Australia in 1883, fostering associations in each state and territory to broaden the reach of first aid assistance.

== Activity streams ==
St John Ambulance NSW focuses on many different areas of healthcare, including

=== Event health services ===
Responders (First Aiders), First Responders, EMTs (Advanced Responders) and Health Care Professionals provide comprehensive medical services at events ranging from small community events (such as school fates and sports days, corporate events), to large public events such as Anzac Day services, Sydney Royal Easter Show, City2surf, Music Festivals, and New Year's Eve celebrations.

Previously known as First Aid Services (FAS), and Operations Branch (OB).

=== Training ===
St John Ambulance is one of the largest first aid training organisations in Australia. St John NSW delivers nationally recognised training through the Australian Qualifications Framework, through the registration of their parent organisation St John Ambulance Australia.

==== Public ====
St John NSW can provide training to the public for units of competency including:

- Provide cardiopulmonary resuscitation
- Provide basic emergency life support
- Provide first aid (previously known as Apply First Aid and Senior First Aid)
- Provide an emergency first aid response in an education and care setting
- Provide first aid in remote situations
- Provide advanced first aid
- Provide advanced resuscitation and oxygen therapy
- Manage first aid services and resources
- Provide pain management
- Perform rescue from a live low-voltage (LV) panel

Revenue derived from training is reinvested into training volunteers and community programs to promote the cause of saving lives through first aid awareness.

==== Internal ====
St John NSW members undergo internal training programs to obtain clinical qualifications and positions within the organisation.

- St John Responders (First Aiders) hold:
  - Provide first aid
  - Provide cardiopulmonary resuscitation
  - Provide basic emergency life support
- St John First Responders hold:
  - All required qualifications of St John First Aider
  - Provide advanced first aid
  - Provide advanced resuscitation
  - Provide pain management
  - Certificate II in Medical Service First Response (or equivalent)
- St John Emergency Medical Technicians (Advanced Responders) hold:
  - All required qualifications of St John First Responder
  - Certificate III in Basic Health Care (or equivalent)
  - Additional non-accredited advanced skill certificates
- Senior officers hold:
  - Certificate IV in Leadership and Management
- Trainers hold:
  - Certificate IV in Training and Assessment

Members must undergo yearly reaccreditation and minimum hours to hold clinical ranks. Other positions also require ongoing professional development to demonstrate currency.

St John NSW does not train paramedics or offer diplomas in paramedical science programs in NSW.

=== Education and awareness ===
As advocates for first aid, St John NSW volunteer trainers deliver first aid skills in the community.

St John NSW supports and funds a "First Aid in Schools" program aimed and engaging primary school aged students in first aid. St John continues to use its influence to promote early education in schools across Australia.

Examples of the program success is becoming more visible in the media:

- Nikita Stutchbury saves mother, October 2015
- Zach Redwood saves five-year-old brother, March 2016
- Preston May saves little brother, March 2016

Recognition programs are in place to award the public for use of first aid and CPR skills in the community. "Save a Life Award was an important opportunity to publicly acknowledge the admirable actions of recipients, and thank them on behalf of patients, their families and the local community."

St John produce and distribute publications aimed at educating the general public including posters and fact sheets. The "St John Australian First Aid Manual" is widely distributed and is edited by a clinical board yearly to align with the most current evidence available.

St John Ambulance Australia has created and operates an Automated External Defibrillators (AED) register. The register aims to help locate this essential equipment often required in cardiac arrest.

=== Equipment ===
St John NSW offers several services including:

- First aid kit manufacture and sales (direct or through local retailers)
- First aid stock manufacture and distribution
- Automatic External Defibrillator (AED) sales including equip, install and compliance check
- Kit audit and restock services for state Work Health and Safety Act compliance.

First aid equipment is also utilised within the Event Health Services branch.

=== Ophthalmic care ===
St John NSW raises funds and recruits staff for "ophthalmic projects in rural and remote areas of Northern NSW" the St John Ophthalmic Eye Hospital in Jerusalem.

== Emergency response ==
St John NSW is a "participating organisation" under the NSW HEALTHPLAN and maintains a formal resource commitment agreement with NSW Health to assist in disaster relief activities.

In practice, recently this has involved St John volunteers:

- Providing first aid and support at evacuation centres for bushfires and floods.
- Providing first aid at staging areas for other emergency services (e.g. NSW Rural Fire Service) at bushfires.
- Volunteer support to public information hotlines.
- Assistance with temperature screening and testing services during the COVID-19 pandemic.

St John Ambulance volunteers also provide the emergency ambulance service for Norfolk Island.

== Divisions ==
St John Ambulance has 72 divisions across New South Wales from 18 areas. Combined divisions include both adult members as well as cadet and junior members. Cadet divisions are only for cadets. All other divisions are for adults.

Adult / Cadet / Combined Divisions of St John NSW by geographic region after the zone restructure in 2024/2025. Note: Support / Non geographical divisions not listed below.

| Metro Northern | Metro Central & Southern | Metro Western | Regional Northern & Hunter | Regional Southern | Regional Western & Central Coast |
|---|---|---|---|---|---|
| Harbourside Combined | Glebe Adults | Bankstown Adults | Armidale Adults | Albury Combined | Adamstown Cadets |
| Hills Adults | Glebe Cadets | Bankstown Cadets | Cessnock Combined | Bulli Combined | Bathurst Combined |
| Holroyd Cadets | Granville Combined | Blacktown Adults | Lismore Adults | Cooma Adults | Broken Hill Adults |
| Hornsby Adults | Paddington Combined | Blacktown Cadets | Maitland Combined | Goulburn Combined | Broken Hill Cadets |
| Hornsby Cadets | St George Combined | Bonnyrigg High School Cadets | Manning Great Lakes (Taree) Combined | Kiama Combined | Central Coast Combined |
| Ku-ring-ai Adults | Sutherland Combined | Cecil High School Cadets | Mid North Coast (Coffs Harbour) Combined | Moruya Combined | Gosford Combined |
| Macquarie Park Cadets | University of NSW Adults | Fairfield Adults | Singleton Combined | Queanbeyan Combined | Hamilton Adults |
| Northern Rocks Cadets | University of Sydney Adults | Fairfield Cadets | Tamworth Combined | Shoalhaven Combined | Lake Macquarie Combined |
| Northern Beaches Adults | Western Suburbs Adults | Hawkesbury City Adults | Tweed Heads Combined | Wagga Wagga Combined | Molong Combined |
| Paramatta Adults | Western Suburbs Cadets | Macarthur Adults | | Wollongong Combined | Orana Combined |
| Ryde Adults | | Miller Combined | | | Orange Combined |
| Ryde Cadets | | Penrith Combined | | | |
| | | Riverstone Cadets | | | |

Zones / Divisions Sourced from internal documents and the official St John NSW divisions page.

== Vehicles ==
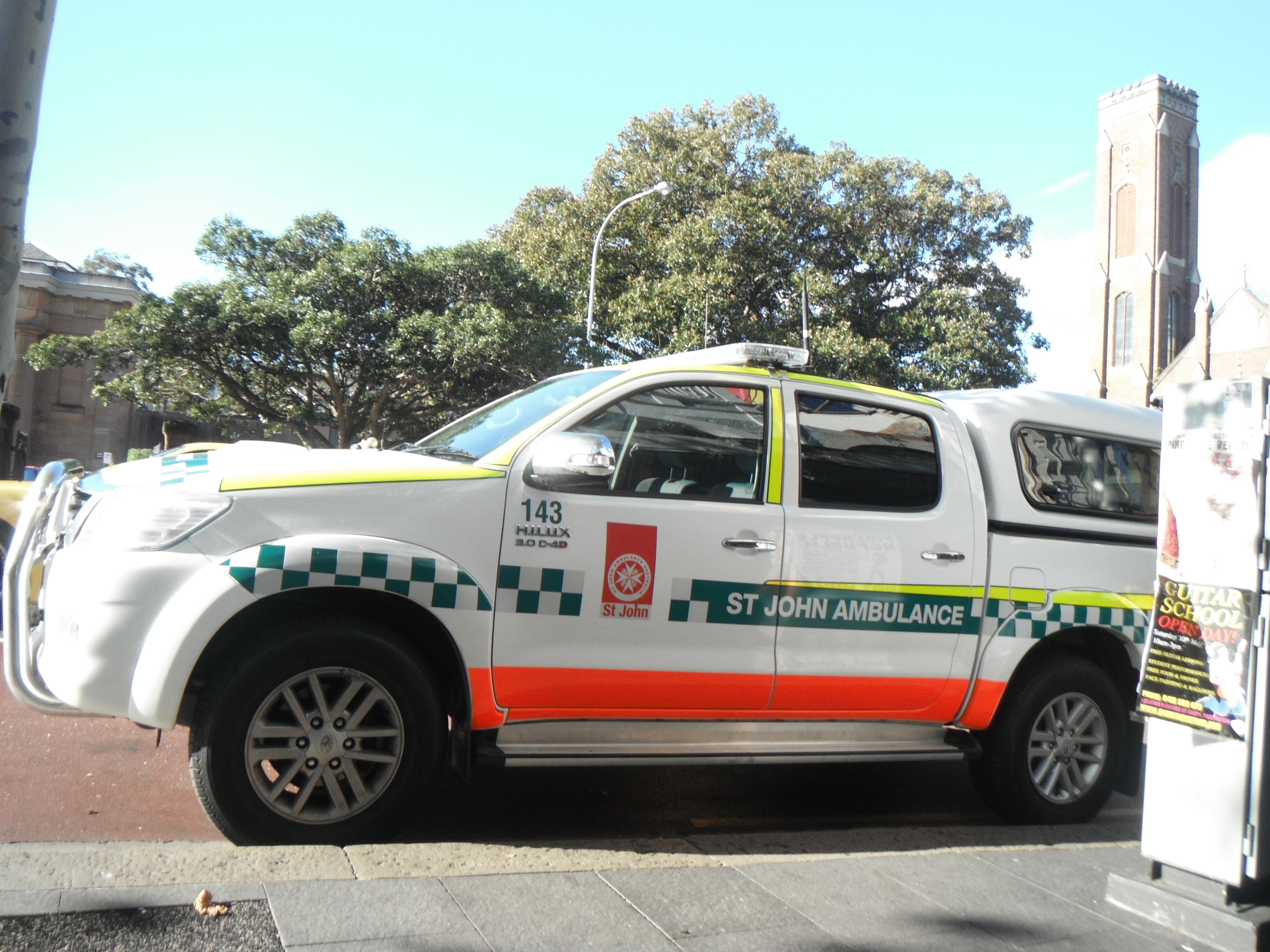
An event response vehicle

Vehicles are used within St John NSW to support the organisational needs and values.

=== Event health services ===
All the event health services vehicles are fitted with flashing red or red and white beacons, sirens, highly visible vehicle livery as well as radio communications.

Strict internal policies applies to the use of lights and sirens.

==== Casualty management vehicles ====
An ambulance or patient transport vehicle that is either two or four-wheel drive. This type of vehicle is fitted with a Stryker M1 stretcher, piped oxygen, and other pre-hospital care equipment.

==== Communications vehicles ====
Vehicles used by the state communications group to provide radio communications for events.

==== Bicycle Emergency Response Team (BERT) ====
Vehicles used by the bicycle emergency response team to transport bicycles and other equipment to and from events.

==== Command vehicles ====
Vehicles driven by members of command staff for duties to and from the event.

=== Business stream ===
Stub to expand Vehicles may be used for specialist business areas, such as the equipment supply and restocking business stream. Vehicle livery is intended to match the vehicle purpose, and may possess either corporate or service specific branding.

=== Role specific ===
Stub to expand Where the Board and/or the CEO has determine that a vehicle is required for effective performance in the job role, that role may access or be assigned a fleet vehicle. Vehicles are either plain in appearance, or branded with corporate livery.

== See also ==
- St John Ambulance
  - St John Ambulance Australia
- Ministry of Health (New South Wales)
  - New South Wales Ambulance
