= Paramedics in Australia =

Emergency healthcare profession

A paramedic in Australia is a health practitioner who holds registration with the Paramedicine Board of Australia as a Registered Paramedic. As of June 2025, there are over 26,600 registered paramedics in Australia, of which approximately 70% (18,620) work for a jurisdictional service such as the Queensland Ambulance Service, and of which 52% of which are female. Most paramedics hold a bachelor's degree, and some may undergo further education in critical care or primary care paramedicine. Only Registered Paramedics may lawfully use the title of "paramedic" in Australia. Other non-paramedic emergency care professionals include emergency medical technicians or first responders, which typically hold vocational and not tertiary qualifications.

== Regulation ==
From 1 December 2018, paramedicine became a nationally regulated profession under the Paramedicine Board of Australia (PBA). The PBA is supported by the Australian Health Practitioner Regulation Agency, which provides day-to-day functions for Australia's regulated health professions, such as managing practitioner registration and complaints. The title "paramedic" is protected in Australia under the Health Practitioner National Law, only Registered Paramedics are legally permitted to call themselves paramedics or practice as a paramedic.

For most paramedics, education requirements for registration are met through a bachelor's degree in paramedicine from an institution approved by the PBA. Some paramedics will hold alternative approval, such as under transitional programs for paramedics practising prior to 2018, an accepted international qualification, or a mix of formal qualifications and demonstrated competency. Other requirements for registration include meeting criminal history check standards, English language skills, professional indemnity insurance, and recency of practice. Ongoing registration also requires at least 30 hours of continuing professional development per year.

== Education and training ==
=== Undergraduates ===
Registration as a paramedic typically requires completion of an approved qualification recognised by Ahpra. Undergraduate paramedicine education provides a wide breadth of training, but a primary focus on life-threatening care needs, mainly cardiology, respiratory and trauma management. Currently, 15 universities offer recognised undergraduate bachelor degrees:

- Australian Catholic University
- Central Queensland University
- Charles Sturt University
- Curtin University
- Edith Cowan University
- Flinders University
- Griffith University
- La Trobe University
- Monash University
- Queensland University of Technology
- University of Tasmania
- University of Southern Queensland
- University of the Sunshine Coast
- Victoria University
- Western Sydney University

Entry to undergraduate degrees remains competitive, with a mean entry ATAR of 83.2 in 2021. Some paramedic degrees are dual (that is, combined with another discipline, for example Bachelor of Paramedicine/Bachelor of Nursing). In 2021 there were approximately 8,000 Bachelor's Degree paramedicine students in Australia, with a significant surplus of graduates to recruitment within the jurisdictional services, leading to increased recruitment in other care settings such as primary care/GP clinics and emergency departments.

Undergraduate degrees involve three years of full-time study consisting of three core elements: theoretical knowledge, practical simulations, and workplace integrated learning in the form of clinical placement. Academic coursework involves:

- a foundational understanding of anatomy, physiology, pathophysiology, and pharmacology,
- comprehensive training in resuscitation, traumatology, cardiology, pulmonology, neurology, obstetrics, and mental health, and
- lower levels of study in other fields such as gastroenterology, toxicology, endocrinology, or oncology.

Theoretical knowledge is assessed through written assessment and examinations, while practical skills such as laryngoscopy and obstetric delivery are usually developed in practical simulations (commonly called 'pracs') and assessed in Objective Structured Clinical Examinations (OSCEs). Assessment in OSCEs is usually benchmarked to the Clinical Practice Guidelines (CPGs) for the simulated presentation for the local jurisdictional ambulance service. Performance during clinical placement is typically assessed against professional and clinical standards. Unlike other regulated health professions such as nursing, paramedicine students do not have a regulated minimum number of placement hours but rather is at the discretion of education institutions.

=== Postgraduate qualifications ===
A Master's Degree is generally mandatory to progress to specialisation as an Intensive Care or Primary Care paramedic, and is usually funded by the employer. Doctoral studies are growing in paramedicine, and are offered at multiple universities. As of 2023 there were 23 Paramedics with PhDs working in Australian Universities.

== Employment ==
As of December 2021, there are over 22,500 registered paramedics in Australia, of which approximately 70% (15,750) work for a state service. With the exception of the Northern Territory and Western Australia, all services are government agencies, and are commonly collectively referred to as the jurisdictional ambulance services (JASs). The services had a collective budget of over $4 billion AUD in 2021. The eight state services are:

1. Ambulance Tasmania
2. Ambulance Victoria
3. Australian Capital Territory Ambulance Service
4. New South Wales Ambulance
5. Queensland Ambulance Service
6. SA Ambulance Service
7. St John Northern Territory
8. St John Western Australia

Employment outside the state services is not subject to routine data collection, and there is limited accurate information available to summarise these roles.

== Clinical scope of practice ==
Although paramedics hold legal authority to practice through their registration as a paramedic, practice with a pre-hospital care provider typically requires an additional authority to practice that outlines a paramedic's approved assessment and intervention skill as determined by their employer. These two forms of authority to practice form a large element of a paramedic's scope of practice. Authority to practice varies by jurisdiction, but broadly involves four levels of increasing capability:

1. Graduate or intern paramedics (sometimes referred to as an "Advanced Care Paramedic, Level 1")
2. General paramedics ("Advanced Care Paramedic, Level 2")
3. Intensive or critical care paramedics (ICP or CCP)
4. Flight or retrieval paramedics

Some paramedics will hold an additional or restricted authority, authorising additional skills or a focus on low acuity, retrievals, and primary care practice. Organisations typically do not allow intern paramedics in their first year of practice after initial qualification (commonly referred to as a graduate or "grad" year) to practice independently until they complete a workplace graduate program and progress to the general paramedic level. General paramedics may apply to complete further training (usually master's level education and an organisational program) to advance to the ICP/CCP scope.

Extended care paramedics are specially trained to treat lower-acuity patients, avoiding the need to transport patients to hospital for definitive treatment. This involves primary care for patients with uncomplicated conditions not anticipated to require hospital-level nursing or medical care, or supporting patients to access alternative care providers such as general practice or community care organisations. Paramedics practising at this level can sometimes be called "Community Paramedics" (CPs) and work in a "Local Area Assessment and Referral Unit" (LARU).

Intensive care paramedics (ICPs), sometimes known as Critical Care Paramedics (CCPs) or Mobile Intensive Care Ambulance Paramedics (MICAs), provide additional critical care skills such as advanced airway management, critical care cardiology, and medically-induced sedation. ICPs most commonly operate as individual practitioners out of smaller vehicles holding only specialist equipment, instead assisting other ambulance crews as required.

Beyond Critical & Intensive Care paramedics, most services additionally have a third-tier clinical level, usually reserved for Helicopter Emergency Medical Services (HEMS) paramedics, commonly called Flight Paramedics. Additional qualifications for this level vary; in some services a Graduate Diploma is required, while in others a second Master's Degree is undertaken (for a total of 7 years' university, including previous qualifications). Flight Paramedics undertake high level and critical cases by both road and air, and depending on the service have additional aviation training as down-the-wire winch crew. Paramedics have additional critical care training to facilitate stabilisaiton of the patient prior to helicopter transportation. This usually includes administration of blood products, pressors, mechanical ventilation, finger thoracostomy, and ultrasonography. In Western Australia, the Northern Territory, South Australia, and Victoria Flight Paramedics usually work autonomously, while in ACT, NSW, Queensland, and Tasmania they usually work in a team with a critical care doctor. Flight responses generally fall into two categories: a primary rescue (where the helicopter vehicle is required to access the patient – such as for winching – or transport larger distances) or a primary retrieval (where the additional skills or medications of a Flight Paramedic are required for stabilisation of the patient).

An example of the types of skills and medications often authorised by employers to the different paramedic clinical levels is provided in the table below:

Clinical level	Generalist paramedic	Extended Care paramedic	Intensive Care paramedic	Additional scopes of practice (commonly Flight Paramedics)
Routine medications	Adrenaline, aspirin, antivenoms, ceftriaxone, clopidogrel, dexamethasone, droperidol, fentanyl, glucagon, glyceryl trinitrate, heparin, hydrocortisone, hydroxocobalamin, ibuprofen, ipratropium bromide, ketamine, magnesium sulphate, methoxyflurane, midazolam, morphine, naloxone, ondansetron, oxytocin, paracetamol, prochlorperazine, tenecteplase, ticagrelor, tranexamic acid	Frusemide, lignocaine, loperamide, loratadine, Amlodipine, Amoxicillin / Azithromycin / Benzacine penicillin / Ceftriaxone / Erythromycin / Flucloxacillin / Gentamicin / Roxithromycin / Chloramphenicol / Doxycycline / Nitrofurantoin, Metronidazole, Bisacodyl / Sennoside B, Codeine / Oxycodone, Hyoscine butylbromide, Kenacomb, Levomepromazine, Levonorgestrel, Loperamide, Metoprolol, Miconazole, Parecoxib, Prednisolone, Vaccines	Atracurium, Amiodarone, Atropine, Adenosine, Benztropine, Calcium gluconate, levetiracetam, olazapine, propofol, rocuronium, vercuronium, suxamethonium, sodium bicarbonate	Blood products, Enoxaparin, Plasma, Fibrinogen, Isoprenaline, lorazepam, metaraminol, metoprolol, noradrenaline, phenytoin, nifedepine, parecoxib
Routine skills	Intravenous cannulation, medication administration (IV, PO, IM, SC, SL), auscultation, vital signs survey, airway management (OPA, NPA, LMA, suction), gastric tube insertion, laryngoscopy, magill's forceps, needle thoracostomy, resuscitation (CPR, defibrillation), IPPV, CPAP,	Local anaesthesia (digital ring block, dental block, fascia iliaca block, wound exploration / closure), Enema administration – fleet (phosphate) / microlax, Manual decompaction of faeces, Ophthalmoscopy, Otoscopy, Peak expiratory flow rate measurement, PEG management, Rectal prolapse reduction, Urinary catheterisation, Wound closure – glue, staples, sutures	Rapid sequence induction, delayed sequence induction, ketamine-only breathing intubation, cricothyroidotomy, mintracheostomy, infusions, cardioversion, pacing, intraosseous access	Finger or tube thoracostomy, mechanical ventilation, Focused Abdominal Sonography in Trauma, invasive blood pressure monitoring

=== Paramedic Practitioners ===
Australia does not recognise the position of "paramedic practitioner" that appears in some other countries such as the United Kingdom. The Australian Institute of Paramedic Practitioners (ACPP) is a professional association advocating for the creation of a role similar, and states that a Paramedic Practitioner would have the capability to "assess and treat a broad range of patients". While paramedics may legally practice in an independent setting, paramedics do not have the legal authority to prescribe or initiate medicines outside of ambulance Drug Therapy Protocols (DTPs, a form of standing order authorised by a doctor or nurse practitioner) or access Medicare rebates for services.

In June 2023, Monash University announced it had been promised $20 million in funding by the Victorian Government to develop an Australian 'Paramedic Practitioner' role and begin training in 2024 to have 25 Paramedic Practitioners qualified by 2026.

== Clinical practice guidelines and drug therapy protocols ==
All jurisdictional services in Australia utilise clinical practice guidelines (CPGs) to outline how paramedics 'should' assess and treat patients. Unlike in nursing and medicine, adhering to the CPGs is often regarded as pivotal, and new paramedics may be expected to memorise all their CPGs although this is changing. Cases are routinely audited, and variations from CPGs usually result in a paramedic being formally asked to explain their reasoning behind the variation, and in some cases disciplinary action. Additionally, universities usually use the local CPG as an assessment tool during OSCEs. All 8 state service CPGs are openly available.

With the exception of a sharing agreement between Ambulance Victoria and Ambulance Tasmania (where Tasmania pay a nominal annual licensing fee to use Ambulance Victoria's CPGs, which are then modified as appropriate for Tasmanian requirements), CPGs are developed largely in isolation by each individual service.

Paramedics do not hold legal authority to prescribe, administer or supply medications without authority from a doctor or nurse practitioner. In practice, authority to administer medications is provided through Drug Therapy Protocols (DPTs) - a form of standing order prescription that outlines the conditions when paramedics may administer a drug, and in what form and dose. DTPs are authorised under state and territory ambulance legislation or medicines regulation, and approved by organisation medicines committees. The use of medicines outside of DTPs requires special approval from a doctor or nurse practitioner.

== Professional organisations ==
=== Colleges ===
Australia's primary professional association for paramedics is the Australasian College of Paramedicine (ACP). In 2019, a group of paramedics founded a subset college specialising in low acuity paramedicine, the Australasian College of Paramedic Practitioners (ACPP). There is no critical care paramedicine college. Unlike for medical practitioners (doctors), membership of a college is not a prerequisite to specialisation and colleges do not authorise training programs nor assess candidates for clinical skills. The role of the colleges is a combination of providing continual professional development (of which 30 hours per year is required to maintain registration with AHPRA) opportunities via education and conferences, advocacy, and funding research.

=== Unions ===
Paramedics are usually encouraged to join unions by employers, and union-employer bargaining is the primary determinant of Enterprise Bargaining Agreements that determine pay and work conditions. Industrial representation varies from state to state. Registered paramedic unions in Australia include Ambulance Employees Australia (AEA) and the Health Services Union. Unregistered (non-Union employee support organisations) include Australian Paramedics Associations (APA), Victorian Ambulance Union (VAU) & Australian Paramedic Association QLD (APAQ).
