= Sunshine Coast Helicopter Rescue Service =

The Sunshine Coast Helicopter Rescue Service was an Australian non-profit organisation, established in 1979 to undertake vital rescue, medical and search missions throughout south-east Queensland. The service was based at the Sunshine Coast Airport at Marcoola, on the Sunshine Coast, Queensland. It merged with LifeFlight Australia in 2013.

== History ==
The service began life as the Sunshine Coast Helicopter Rescue Service in November 1979. Local businessman Des Scanlan, alongside other local business people and heads of Emergency Services helped establish the Service with the purchase of a single helicopter; a Bell 206 Jetranger, and operated from a base at the Big Cow on the Bruce Highway at Yandina. In 1983, the base was moved to Maroochydore Airport. The services' operations were extended in 1989 with the purchase of a second helicopter, a Bell 206L Longranger, with the help of a $450,000 grant from the Government of Queensland.

Major sponsorship from 1979 onwards came either directly or indirectly from the Bank of New South Wales and its successor, Westpac. The energy distribution corporation South East Queensland Electricity Board (SEQEB), began sponsorship in 1994 (the service would be renamed Energex Community Rescue Helicopter in 1998 following SEQEB's name change). The financial assistance from Energex and its customers (Energex consumers could nominate a donation to the Service from their quarterly utility bill) allowed the Service to purchase a third helicopter - a MBB/Kawasaki BK 117 - in 1997.

The Rescue Service was able to broaden its operations when, in March 1998, an additional base was set up at the Queensland Ambulance Service (QAS) Aerial Ambulance Hangar in Bundaberg, initially for a three-year trial period. In July 2001, with the realisation of the need for a second operational base, the Bundaberg Service was established on a permanent basis. At the same time the Minister for Department of Emergency Services increased the Queensland Emergency Service grants by millions of dollars a year for the service to provide bigger and better helicopters for the Bundaberg base.

In 2006, having outgrown the Service's existing facilities, and thanks to a federal government grant of $500,000 as well as donations from sponsors and the local community, the Sunshine Coast operation moved to a new purpose-built hangar within the Sunshine Coast Airport site. A year later, in 2007, Energex announced a record $1 million-per-year sponsorship of the service over the next three years in order to maintain the high level of service.

The service was professionally run, with 21 operational aircrew, four administrative staff and a number of dedicated volunteers, and works in close co-operation with Queensland Emergency Services and other Queensland community-based helicopter providers to provide helicopter rescue cover in south-east Queensland to assist Queensland Police, Queensland Health, Queensland Ambulance Service, Queensland Fire and Rescue Service, the State Emergency Service (SES), AusSAR and other services and organisations, such as the Coastguard. To ensure a no-cost operation, finances are obtained through sponsorship, donations, government subsidy and charter operations. All assets of the Service belong to the community.

In April 2009, Energex Community Rescue Helicopter became the AGL Action Rescue Helicopter as a result of a sponsorship deal with AGL. It merged with LifeFlight Australia in 2013.

== Area of operation ==
The main area of operation for the service is from Brisbane in the south to Miriam Vale in the north and west inland to the Bunya Mountains, although the service has ventured as far north as Gladstone, Queensland, as far south as Byron Bay inside New South Wales and as far inland as Chinchilla. 652,800 people reside in the Service's primary area of operation which stretches from Brisbane North to Miriam Vale including Fraser Island and west to Proston, Eidsvold and Monto while 2.3 million inhabit the secondary area extending from Northern New South Wales to Proston and the area south of Gladstone.

In 2007, the Service conducted 771 tasks during the year at an average of 14.8 per week. In that 12-month period a total of 1128 hours were flown and a distance of 67,855 nautical miles (125,667 km) covered.

== Helicopters ==
The service owns and operates three aircraft from its Sunshine Coast base: a MBB/Kawasaki BK 117 (VH-BKV), and a Eurocopter BK-117 (VH-EHQ). A Bell Longranger (VH-JOW) is based at Bundaberg.

Kawasaki BK117 B2
Engines: 2 x Honeywell LTS 101-750B Turboshaft 700 SHP (510 kW) ea
Maximum speed: 133 knots (kn) (231 km/h)
Maximum Range: 292 nautical miles (541 kilometres)
Maximum Weight: 3350 kg
Empty weight: 1723 kg
Payload: 1670 kg
Overall length: 13.00 m
Cabin Length: 9.90 m
Height: 3.36 m
Rotor Diameter: 11.00 m

Eurocopter BK117
Engines: 2 x Honeywell LTS 101-750B Turboshaft 700 SHP (510 kW) ea
Maximum speed: 133 knots (kn) (231 km/h)
Maximum Range: 292 nmi (541 km)
Maximum Weight: 3350 kg
Empty weight: 1723 kg
Payload: 1670 kg
Overall length: 13.00 m
Cabin Length: 9.90 m
Height: 3.36 m
Rotor Diameter: 11.00 m

Bell 206L Longranger
Engine: 1 x Rolls-Royce 250-C30P Turboshaft 557 shp (415 kW)
Maximum speed: 110 kn (200 km/h)
Range: 321 nmi (594 km)
Max takeoff weight: 1520 kg
Empty weight: 1047 kg
Payload 473 kg
Length: 10.1 m
Cabin length: 2.74 m
Rotor diameter: 11.28 m

== See also ==
- Westpac Lifesaver Rescue Helicopter Service
