= St John Ambulance Victoria =

St John Ambulance Australia Victoria
- Abbreviation: SJAAV
- Formation: 1883
- Type: Charitable organisation Limited company
- Headquarters: Notting Hill, Victoria
- Location: Victoria, Australia
- CEO: Gordon Botwright
- Key people: Mark Engel (Chairman)
- Parent organisation: St John Ambulance Australia
- Affiliations: St. John Ambulance; Order of St John
- Staff: 500+
- Volunteers: 2,194 (2017)
- Website: https://www.stjohnvic.com.au/

St John Ambulance Victoria, formally St John Ambulance Australia (Victoria) Inc, is the state branch of St John Ambulance Australia in Victoria. St John Victoria is a self-funding, non-profit charitable organisation providing first aid training, patient transport and event health services and youth programs in Victoria. These services are provided through a combination of paid and volunteer staff.

St John Victoria is funded through a combination of government grants, donations and user pays services.

Under the State Health Emergency Response Plan and Emergency Management Manual, St John Victoria can be called upon to provide first aid and patient transport services to the public and other emergency services in times of emergency and disaster. This includes supporting Ambulance Victoria. Most notably, they have been called upon during the January 2017 Melbourne car attack, Melbourne thunderstorm asthma event and Black Saturday bushfires.

== History ==
St John Victoria was initially founded to teach public first aid classes in 1883, and between 1887 and 1916, operated the first ambulance service in Melbourne.

In 1908, they provided their first public first aid duty during the visit of the Great White Fleet.

In 1956, St John Victoria provided event first aid services at the Melbourne Summer Olympics. It was the largest public duty carried out by St John Ambulance in Australia to date.

In 1974, they were called out to assist with the search of missing Australian Prime Minister, Harold Holt. They had formed a search and rescue squad in 1965.

In 2012 the First Aid in Schools program was launched.

In 2013, St John Victoria started their non-emergency patient transport service.

In 2017, the community transport service was launched.

In 2018, they became a trusted response organisation for Ambulance Victoria's new GoodSAM application.

== Structure ==
As a non-profit organisation, revenue from paid services are used to provide free community programs.

=== Event Health Services ===
St John Victoria provides volunteer first aid services at events and emergencies. Volunteers attend over 4,500 public events and treat close to 27,500 patients each year.

Teams within Event Health Services include Bicycle Emergency Response (BERT), Health Emergency Response (HERT), Medical Assistance (MAT), Buggy Response and First Responder Medics.

These services can be deployed to a variety of sporting, music, cultural and major events, including the Australian Open, AFL matches, Melbourne Marathon and Beyond the Valley, as well as smaller local events like school fetes and Little Athletics.

=== Patient Transport ===
St John Victoria operates 57 non-emergency patient transport vehicles, which transported over 65,000 patients in 2024. In 2019 St. John were awarded an expanded contact with Ambulance Victoria and have established additional branches in Geelong, Ballarat, East Keilor and West Melbourne. St John also operate a contract with the Victorian Coroner's Court, transporting deceased persons.

=== Community Transport ===
St John Victoria now operates a demand responsive community transport service, staffed by volunteers.

=== Commercial Training ===
St John Victoria operates a large commercial first aid training department. It has recently expanded into offering non-emergency patient transport training to a Certificate III level.

=== First Aid Kit Servicing ===
St John Victoria operates a department dedicated to workplace first aid kit servicing, sales and stocking.

=== Community Programs ===
St John Victoria runs a number of community programs at no cost. This includes training over 670,000 primary school students in first aid through First Aid in Schools, gifting or subsidising defibrillators to various community clubs and running a free CPR Lab.

=== Youth Program ===
A youth program for children aged 12 – 17 is run by St John Victoria. These members learn first aid and soft skills and attend events alongside the adult Event Health Services volunteers.

== Vehicles ==
St John Victoria operates a fleet of 143 vehicles and 12 bicycles.

These include a number of Toyota HiAce single stretcher first aid posts, Mercedes-Benz Sprinter non emergency patient transport and Hyundai i30, i40 and Santa Fe command vehicles.
