= St John Ambulance Australia =

Australian health and wellbeing charity

- Abbreviation: SJAA
- Formation: 1883; 143 years ago
- Type: Charitable organisation; Limited company
- Location: Australia
- Members: 11,100
- Chancellor: Cameron Oxley
- CEO: Brendan Maher
- Affiliations: St John Ambulance
- Revenue: A$22.6 million (FY23-24)
- Expenses: A$22 million (FY23-24)
- Volunteers: Over 11,000 (2025)
- Website: stjohn.org.au

St John Ambulance Australia (SJAA), known simply as St John, is the Australian national priory of the Order of St John, an international charitable network dedicated to helping people in sickness, distress or danger. Each state and territory has their own autonomous St John organisation, supported by SJAA as the national office. St John organisations in Australia are profit-for-purpose, with revenue from commercial activities used to fund programs aimed at improving the health and wellbeing of Australian communities.

St John first aid training centres were established in Australia in the late 19th century. On 13 June 1883 a public meeting was held in the Melbourne Town Hall, Victoria to form a local branch of the association. By the end of June 1883, a centre had been established under the leadership of Edward Neild.

The first division of the St John Ambulance Brigade, now known as Event Health Services, was established in Glebe, New South Wales in 1903. A division of this organisation is still in operation today and is known as St John Ambulance Glebe Division. After this initial division was established other states followed suit, with divisions being set up in other states soon after. In 1987, the organisation adopted a single public title, "St John Ambulance Australia". The cadet movement was established in Australia in 1925 with a division in Glebe, NSW. The first Grand Prior's Badge issued outside the UK went to a cadet from Marrickville Cadet Division in 1933 named Marion Higgins.

== State and territory organisations ==
St John organisations in each state and territory are responsible for delivering services within their jurisdiction, strategically supported by SJAA. Occasionally, St John members from one jurisdiction may be deployed interstate to assist with large events or emergencies (such as natural disasters).

Organisation	Commercial activities	Charitable activities
St John Queensland	Event Health Services; First aid training; Community transport	First aid in schools; Community transport; St John Eye Van
St John NSW	Event Health Services; First aid training; Community transport; Non-emergency patient transport	First aid in schools
St John ACT		First aid in schools
St John Victoria	Event Health Services; First aid training; Community transport; Non-emergency patient transport; Aged care services	First aid in schools; Defib In Your Streets
St John SA	Health & Medical Services: Event Medical Services; Emergency Incident Health Support; Ambulance Transport (SA Health licensed provider contracted to SA Ambulance Service & private clients/hospitals); Community Care; Commercial First Aid training; Defibrillator and First Aid kit sales; First aid in schools	
St John WA	Emergency ambulance services; Event Health Services	First aid in schools
St John NT	Emergency ambulance services	First aid in schools
St John Tasmania	Event Health Services; First aid training; Community transport	First aid in schools

In Western Australia and the Northern Territory, St John is contracted by the state/territory government to provide public emergency ambulance services.

== Services ==
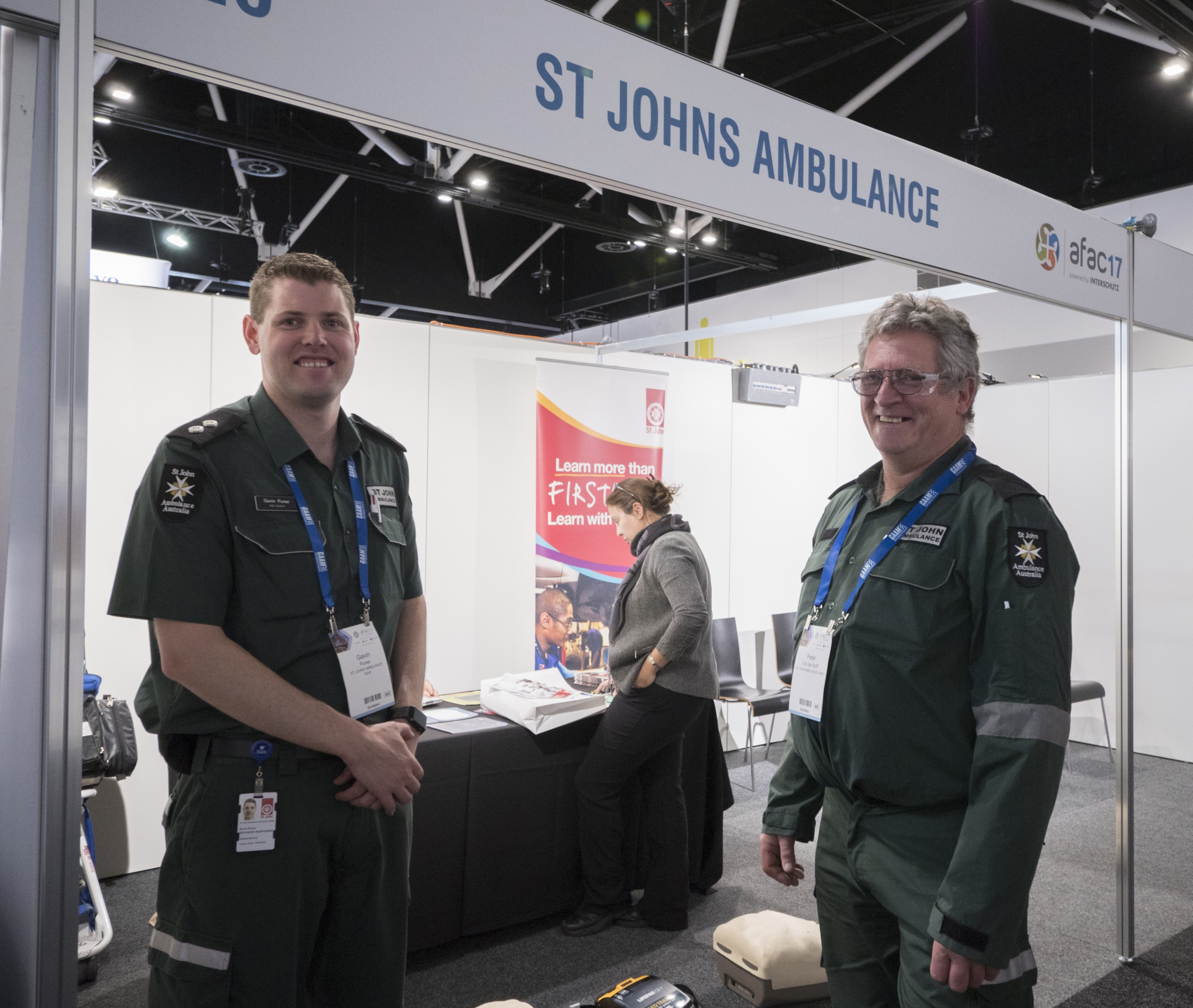
St John NSW volunteers at an event in 2017.

The organisation is divided into the states/territories who have their own boards and oversee the day-to-day running of St John. Some states are also divided into regions, who oversee all branches and report to the state boards. St John Ambulance Australia has three main branches, with each one having its own specific area of operation.

=== Event Health Services ===
St John provides volunteer (and in some States, salaried staffed) event health, medical & first aid services at events and emergencies. In most states, Event Health Services is coordinated by regions containing multiple operational divisions. In South Australia division are known as “Teams”, and in Queensland, they are known as "Hubs".

Events covered by St John Australia include sports, such as the 2006 Melbourne Commonwealth Games, where a team of 500 members treated over 3000 casualties. Other events covered include sporting events, such as the Australian Open, music concerts and community fetes. St John EHS volunteers support state emergency management and disaster plans in some states, in conjunction with other organisations like the State Emergency Service and local councils.

South Australia now engages approximately 200 full time and casual staff providing event health and medical services. Commercial event clients are staffed by salaried staff and supplemented by volunteer members. Volunteer members traditionally cover community events, occasionally needing salaried staff when high risk events require guaranteed attendance of health care professionals. In South Australia both volunteer and salaried staff wear the NHS style green uniform (as used in St John New Zealand). No rank markings are used in South Australia. The clinical levels In South Australia are:

- Event Responder (advanced first aid and advanced resuscitation) including use of inhaled and oral pain relief, adrenaline auto injectors, aspirin for cardiac use and GTN nitroglycerin.
- Event Medic (Certificate II in medical service first response) skills include use of I-Gel airways, pelvic splints, IM adrenaline ampules for anaphylaxis/asthma, glucagon IM, NSAIDs, antihistamines
- Ambulance Officer (Certificate IV in Health Care) skills included IM naloxone, ECG, ondansetron, midazolam
- Registered Nurse, Registered Paramedic, Medical Officer (Doctor)

St John SA does not recognise or Credential Enrolled Nurses (CENs/ENs)

=== Ophthalmic services ===
St John Ambulance in Australia raises funds and recruits staff for the St John Ophthalmic Eye Hospital in Jerusalem. Funds are raised through public donations, and income received from conducting first aid courses and selling first aid kits and merchandise.

St John Queensland also owns and operates the St John Eye Van, a mobile ophthalmic truck which provides eye care to rural and remote Queensland communities, particularly Aboriginal communities. Services available on-board the truck include eye health checks, glasses and prosthesis dispensing, and some minor ophthalmic procedures.

=== First aid training ===
St John is the largest first aid training organisation in Australia. Apart from its flagship Provide First Aid (a workplace first aid course), St John also offer instruction in topics such as Advanced Resuscitation, Advanced First Aid, pain management, remote first aid, live low-voltage rescue, occupational first aid, as well as Adult Teaching and Assessment. The national SJAA office is accredited to provide these courses, which are then delivered in partnership by local St John training teams.

=== Community care and transport ===
St John Community Care conducts programs that are specific to each state. These activities range from assisting disadvantaged youth, to providing voluntary transport and support programs for the frail and elderly.

=== Emergency ambulance services ===
==== Western Australia ====
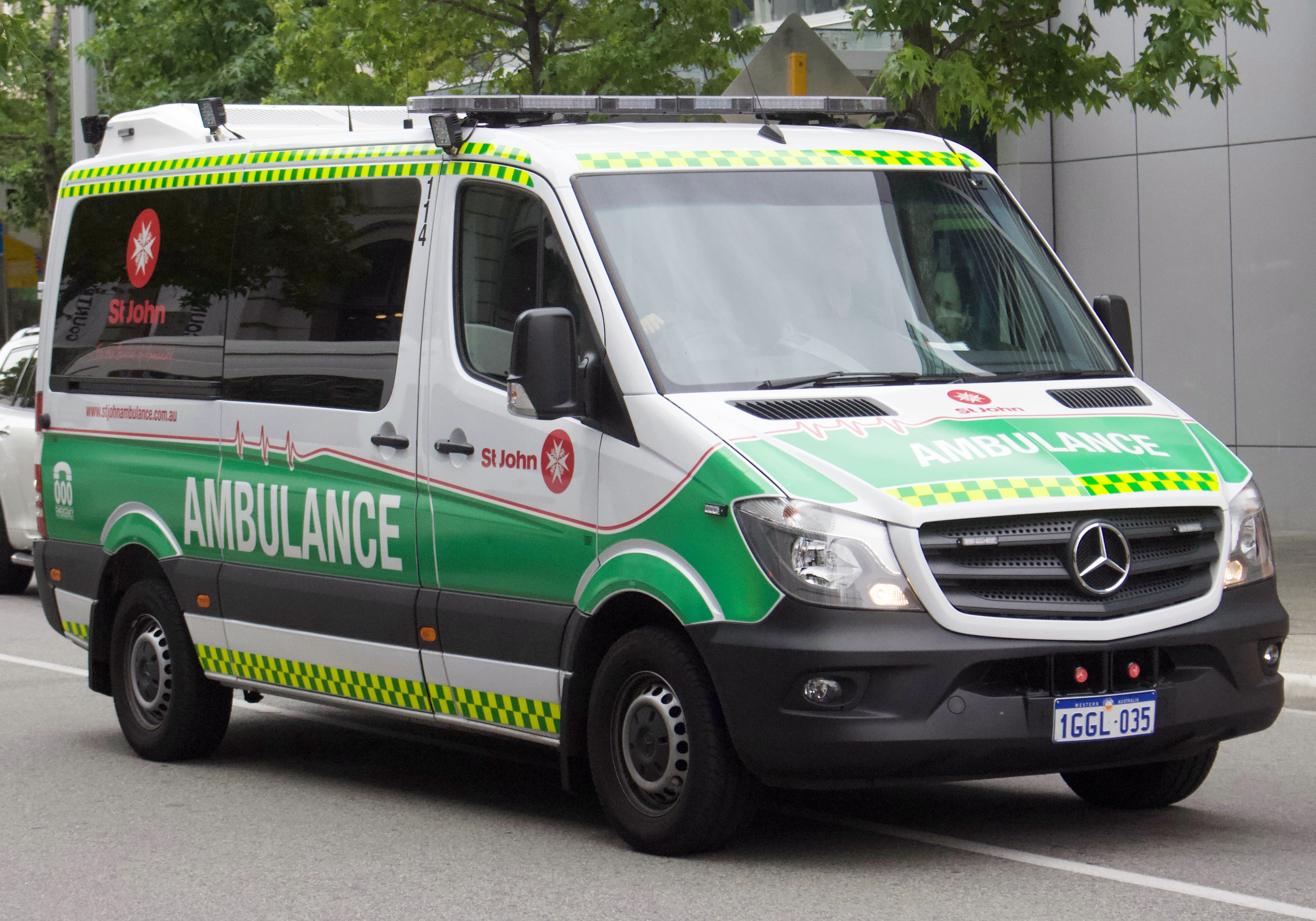
St John Ambulance Western Australia

In Western Australia St John Ambulance provides the ambulance service. This service is provided through a combination of paid and volunteer staff. Paid ambulance officers and paramedics are used in the metropolitan areas and larger regional centres. Volunteer ambulance officers are used in regional areas and some outer metropolitan areas.

==== Northern Territory ====
In the Northern Territory St John Ambulance provides the ambulance service. This service is provided through a combination of paid and volunteer staff. Paid ambulance officers and paramedics are used in the metropolitan areas and larger regional centres. Volunteer ambulance officers are used in regional areas. Aeromedical role is offered by CareFlight operating an AW 139 out of Darwin.

== Ranks in St John ==
St John Ambulance Australia employs the use of ranks, as an organisation with its roots in the military. Its rank structure is based upon that of St John Ambulance in the United Kingdom, while also taking inspiration from the Australian Army. St John Ambulance South Australia no longer wears rank markings on green operational uniforms. Epaulettes show either clinical role or operational role in wording only.

A youth leader is an adult member between 18 and 25 that has undertaken a specific leadership course and is ranked above cadets and privates but below all other adult ranks.

Grade I Officers and above may wear a peak cap with different braiding on the peak for National Officers and Chief Officers.

Clinical epaulettes are worn for members involved in events or activities requiring the Events Uniform.

=== Cadet ranks ===
Cadet Ranks
Rank	Notes
Youth/Cadet	Aged 12–15, has Level 1 First Aid Qualification
Youth Squad Leader/Cadet Corporal	Aged 12–15, has Level 1 First Aid Qualification and has gone through Youth NCO training
Youth Senior Leader/Youth Sergeant	Ibid.
Senior Youth/Senior Youth	Aged 14–18, has Level 2 First Aid Qualification ('Provide First Aid' Qualification)
Senior Youth Squad Leader/Senior Cadet Corporal	Aged 14–18, has Level 2 First Aid Qualification and has gone through Senior Youth NCO training
Senior Youth Senior Leader/Senior Youth Sergeant	Ibid.
Youth Leader ^	Aged 18–25

^ Youth Leaders are adult members who have undertaken a specific leadership course and are ranked above youth members and adult privates, but below grade 6 Adult Officers and above.

=== Adult ranks ===
Divisional Ranks
Rank	Equivalent Australian Army Rank Insignia
Private/Member	Private
Corporal	Corporal
Sergeant	Sergeant
Officer Grade 6	Second Lieutenant
Officer Grade 5	Lieutenant
Officer Grade 4	Captain
Officer Grade 3	Major
Officer Grade 2	Lieutenant Colonel
Officer Grade 1	Colonel
Commissioner	Brigadier
National Officer Grade 3	Brigadier-General
National Officer Grade 2	Major-General
National Officer Grade 1	Lieutenant-General

- N.B. Each adult rank of officer may hold specific titles within a division, region, state/territory or national headquarters, such as Divisional Superintendent. With the exception of the National Youth Officer, national officer appointments are no longer made.

The St John leadership training programs (Cadet Leadership Course, Team Leadership Course or Officer Leadership Course) provide one way to gain the necessary qualifications to meet these requirements. St John leadership training programs are not the only way that a member can be recognised for promotion to officer. They may possess equivalent qualifications or have the knowledge, skill and experience to hold an officer appointment. This recognition of qualifications or experience should be considered on a case by case basis in jurisdictions. A new officer who has not completed the St John leadership training programs should gain a sound working knowledge of St John policies, standards and guidelines.

== Youth and cadet movements ==
St John runs Cadet Divisions for children aged 8–17, this includes Juniors (8–11) and Cadets (11–17). These can be found in most towns or suburbs of major cities in Australia. Examples are Glebe Division and Bathurst Division in New South Wales, Greater Dandenong Division in Victoria and Playford Cadet Division in South Australia.

The cadet program has ceased in Western Australia and Queensland.

The youth program in Australia, focuses on developing young people in a variety of aspects. Young members are taught first aid and participate in youth development and social activities. For cadets, it is also possible to study for various 'badges'. Some of the topics available include counter-disaster, animal care and cookery.

Across most divisions, youth and cadet divisions meet once a week, in a designated place, to conduct a training night. There is a designated training program for youth and cadet divisions

Youth members within Event and Emergency First Aid Service programs attend public duties to provide first aid at various events to members of the public. These duties include things such as: Big Day Out, Royal Easter Show (NSW), National Folk Festival (ACT), AFL Games (All AFL states), NRL, Super 12, and Rugby Union games, amongst other popular events. There are also many more lower profile events, like local fetes and markets. At these duties, St John members use treatment tools such as oxygen therapy equipment, defibrillators and analgesic gases on top of the standard first aid equipment.

In most states, new youth members (minimum age 14) will be put through a Senior First Aid Course (SFA) free of charge.

St John youth also provides leadership opportunities for people of all ages. The program possesses a leadership program and a ranking system similar to the military.

First aid competitions are also held each year. In these competitions, cadets (in teams of up to 3, or on their own) are tested on their first aid skill, practical thinking and problem solving ability, and scene management skills. A national competition is held every year, at the National Cadet Camp.

== See also ==
- St John Ambulance
- Venerable Order of Saint John
- Insignia of the Venerable Order of St John
- Service Medal of the Order of St John
