= LifeFlight Australia =

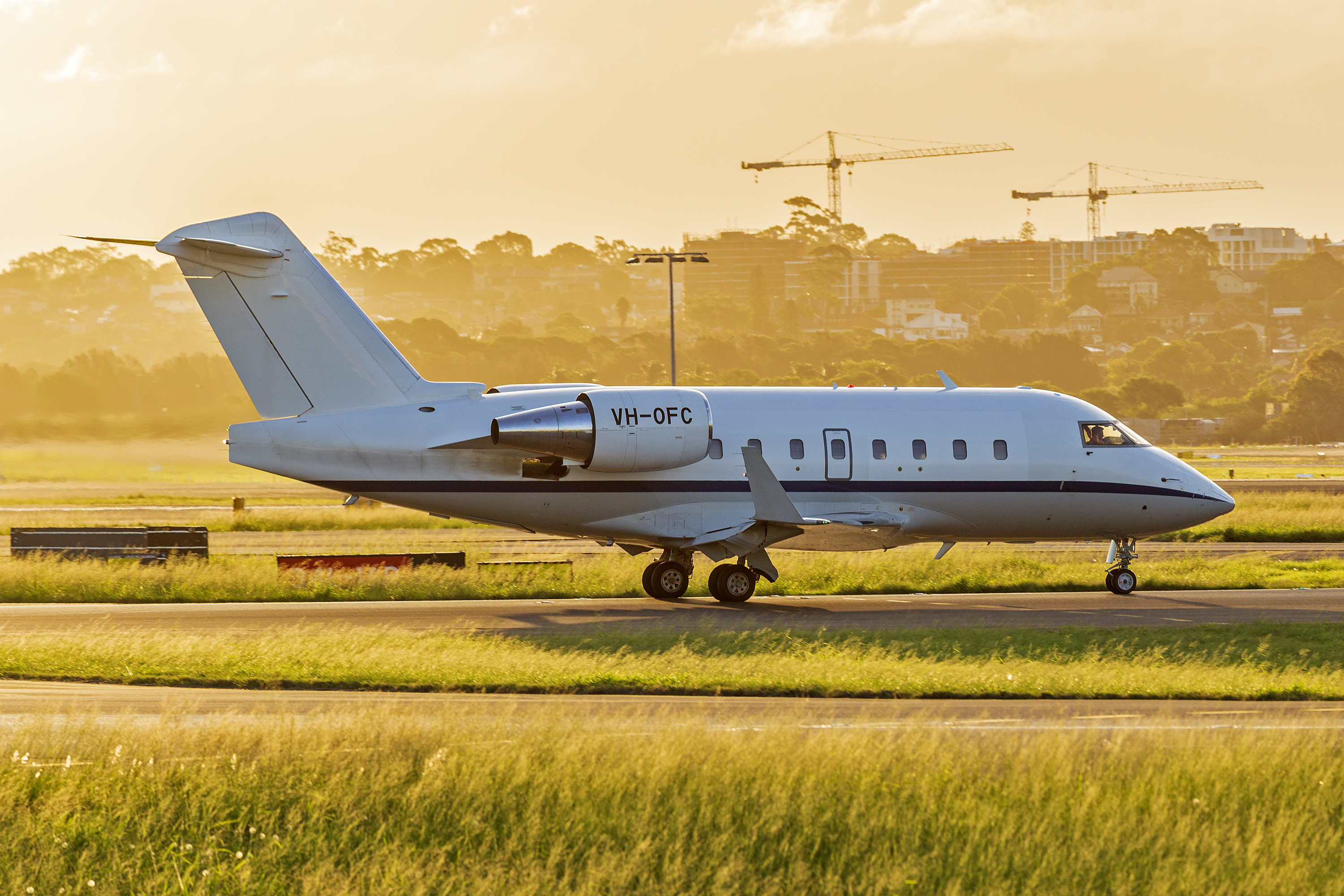
- Lifeflight Australia (VH-OFC) Bombardier CL-600-2B16 Challenger 604 taxiing at Sydney Airport
- Formation: 1979
- Headquarters: Brisbane, Queensland, Australia
- Services: Aeromedical (Primary)
- Key people: Ashley van der Velde
- Subsidiaries: RACQ LifeFlight Rescue LifeFlight Commercial LifeFlight Training Academy LifeFlight Air Ambulance LifeFlight Retrieval Medicine
- Website: https://www.lifeflight.org.au
- Formerly called: Gold Coast Helicopter Rescue Service (GCHRS) (1981 - 1993) CareFlight Queensland (1993 - 2007)             CareFlight Group Queensland (2007 - 2014) CareFlight Group (2014 - 2016)

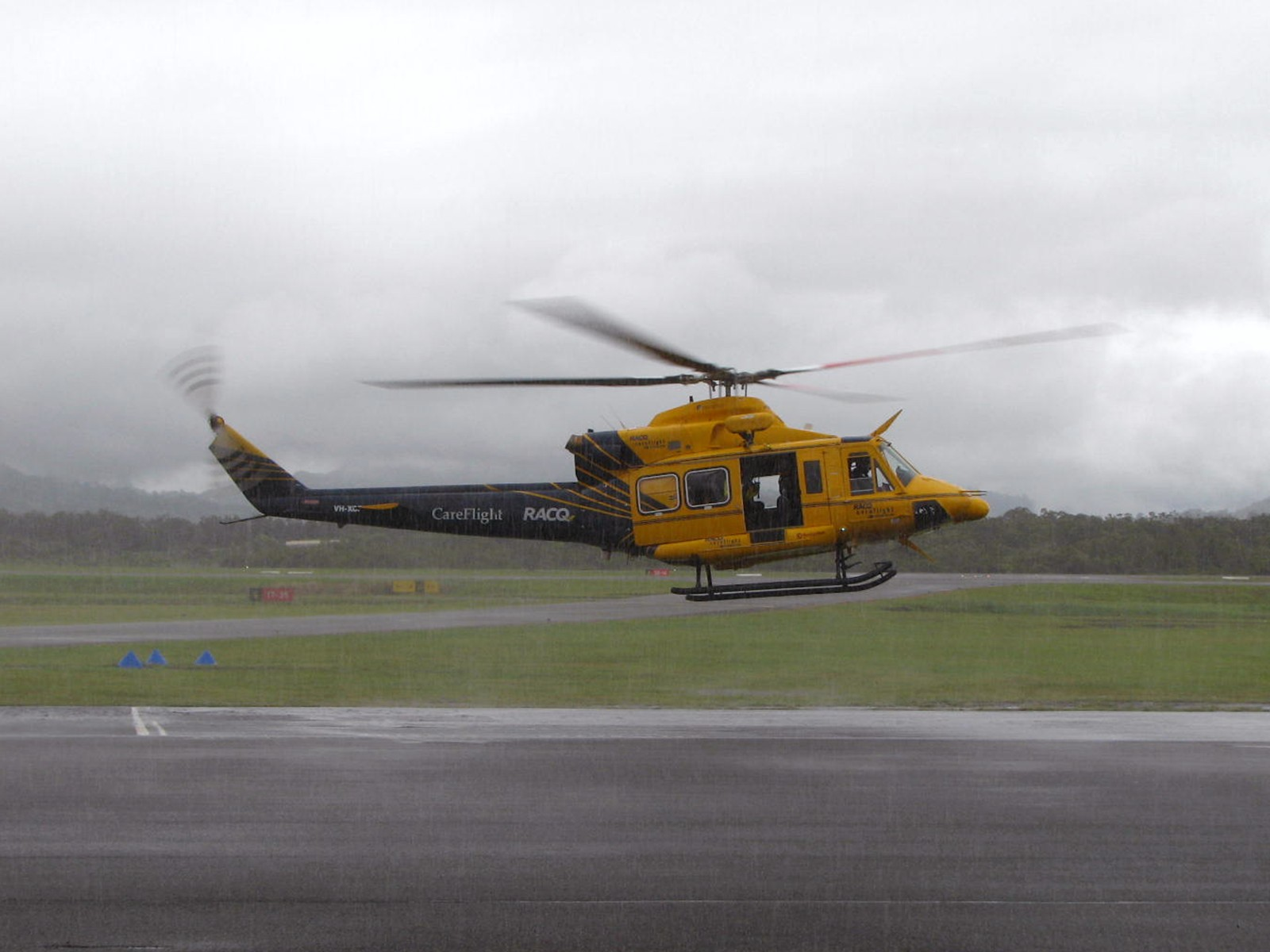
RACQ CareFlight Rescue Bell 412 Helicopter (VH-XCF).

LifeFlight Australia is an aeromedical organisation headquartered in Brisbane, Queensland, Australia. Until July 2016, it was known as CareFlight, but was renamed to avoid confusion with the CareFlight organisation headquartered in New South Wales. LifeFlight has helped over 81,000 people since 1979.

== History ==
In 1981, the Gold Coast Helicopter Rescue Service was established on the Gold Coast to provide rapid rescue services on the Gold Coast beaches and hinterland via helicopter. In 1992, under the new name of CareFlight Group QLD Limited, the rescue services were expanded to cover southern Queensland and northern New South Wales. In 1993, the Royal Automobile Club of Queensland became the naming rights sponsor with the service then known as RACQ CareFlight.

In 2013, CareFlight merged with the Sunshine Coast Helicopter Rescue Service, which had started in December 1979 with its first mission flown from the Big Cow on the Bruce Highway.

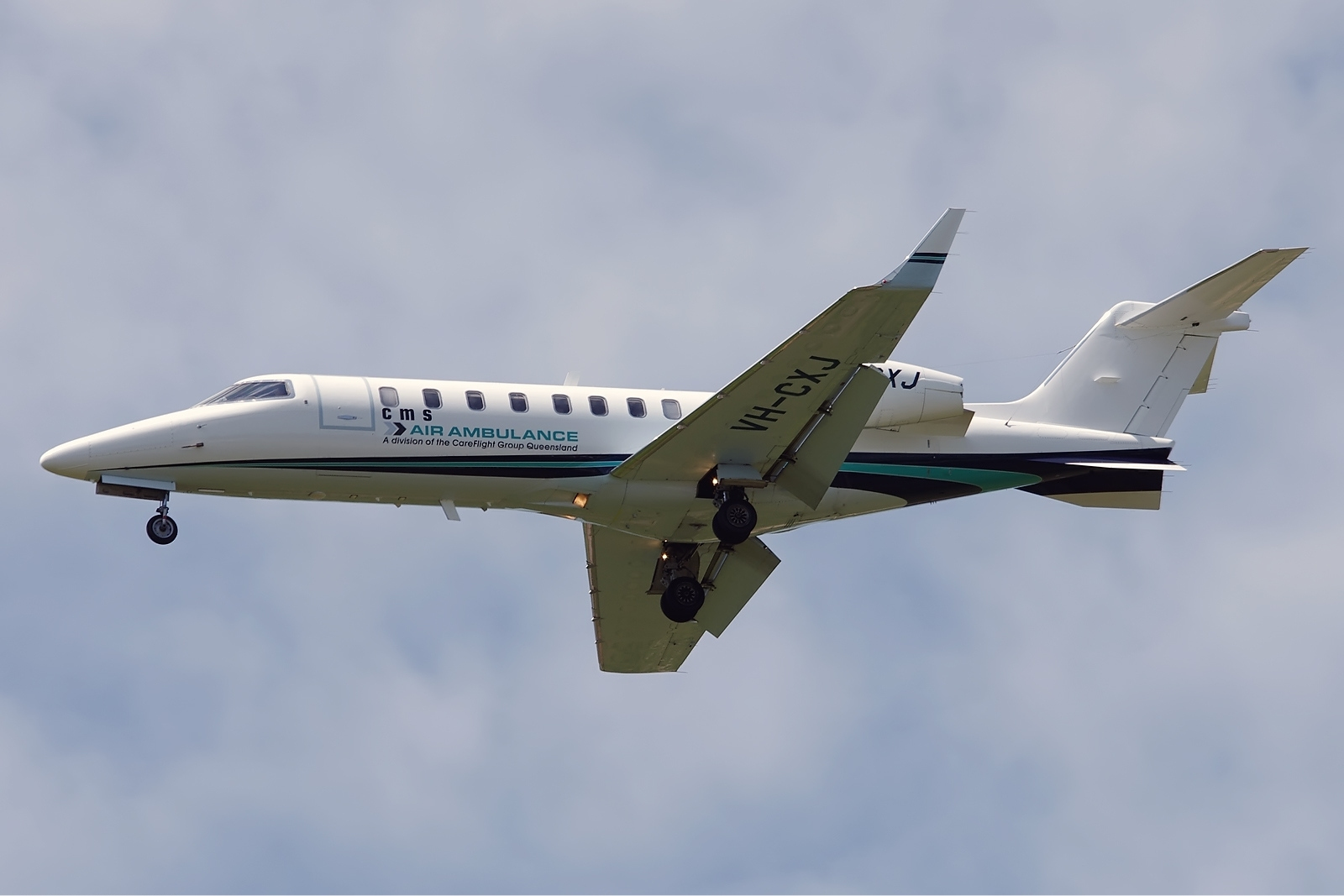
CareFlight Group Air Ambulance (Bombardier Learjet 45) at Darwin Airport, 2010

In 2013 former Queensland Premier Rob Borbidge became chairman of Careflight.

Clive Berghofer of Toowoomba has been a generous benefactor of the organisation. By 2014, he had donated $1 million over 10 years. His contribution is recognised by naming the organisation's hangar at Toowoomba City Aerodrome after him and the helicopter that operates from Toowoomba.

On 11 July 2016, Rob Borbidge, chairman of CareFlight, announced that the organisation would be renamed LifeFlight to avoid confusion with a similar organisation - CareFlight New South Wales. The organisation would be renamed LifeFlight. RACQ remain the major naming rights sponsor of the RACQ LifeFlight Rescue helicopter service.

== Bases ==
Australia: Brisbane Airport, Archerfield Airport, Sunshine Coast Airport, Toowoomba Airport, Bundaberg, Roma, Mount Isa Airport

Singapore: Seletar Airport

== Subsidiaries ==
RACQ LifeFlight Rescue: LifeFlight Australia is most commonly known for its subsidiary RACQ LifeFlight Rescue, which is a not-for-profit community rescue service utilising Rotary and Fixed Wing aircraft. The aircraft are generally staffed by a Pilot, Aircrew Officer, Flight Paramedic or Nurse and a Critical Care Doctor. The naming rights sponsor is RACQ, a motoring club and mutual organisation, providing roadside assistance, insurance, travel, finance and other services.

LifeFlight Commercial: In close conjunction with Starflight, this is the commercial arm of LifeFlight and provides: Program management, Contract Management and oversight, Stakeholder engagement, Performance management, Support services (Ie: Finance/HR etc), Communications Media/Marketing.

LifeFlight Training Academy: This is a training arm of LifeFlight which completes training of aircrews and doctors for operations in the aviation industry. Located at Brisbane Airport, the facility is home to Helicopter Underwater Escape Training (HUET), a full size THALES AW139 Simulator, indoor pool, VR Simulators - both Medical and Aircrew - as well as classrooms.

LifeFlight Air Ambulance: The Fixed Wing arm of the fleet consisting of Bombardier Challenger 600 conducting domestic and international aeromedical missions. They are crewed by a Captain, First Officer, Critical Care Doctor and a Flight Nurse.

== Fleet ==
=== Current fleet ===
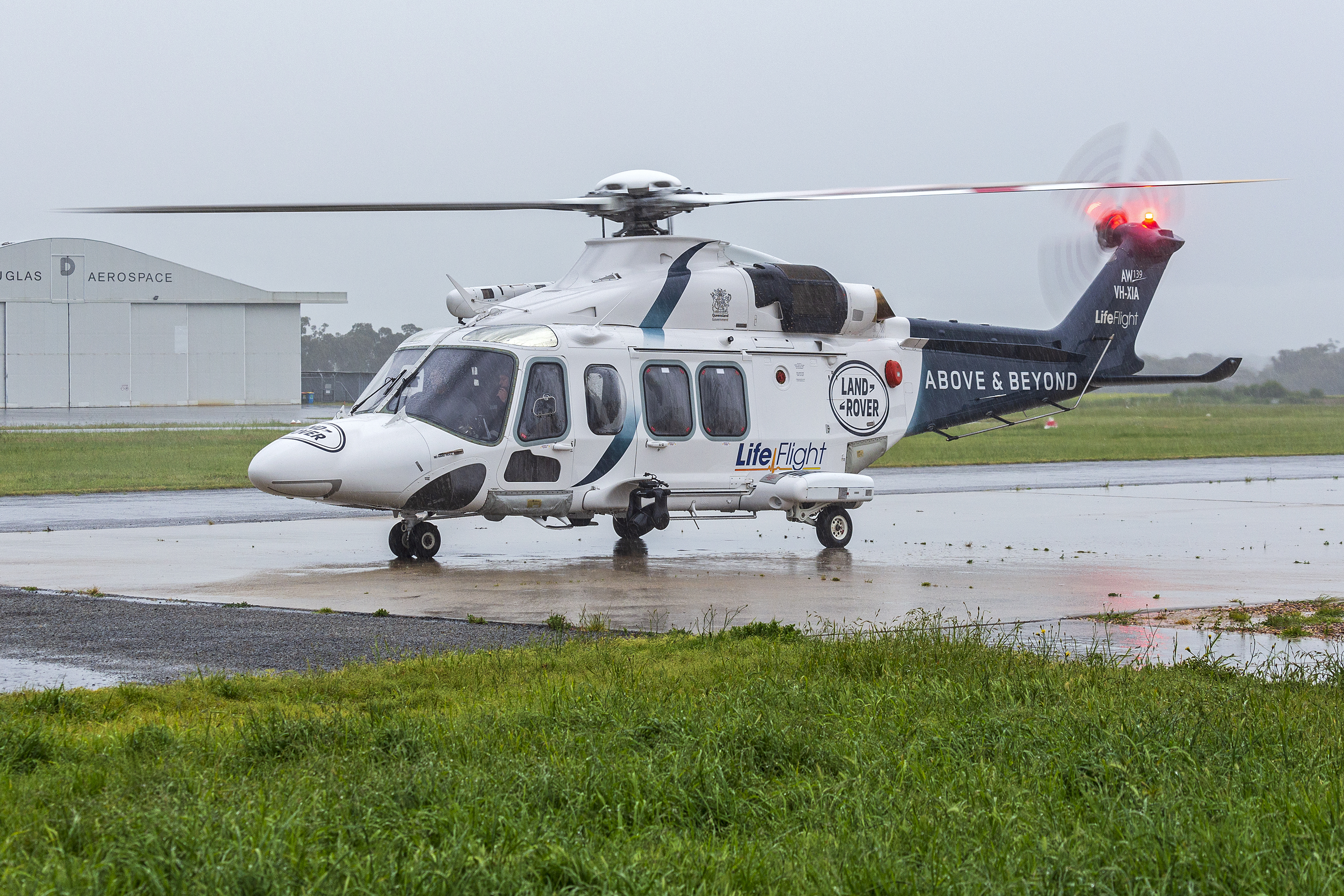
LifeFlight AgustaWestland AW139 Special Mission Helicopter at Wagga Wagga Airport in October 2022

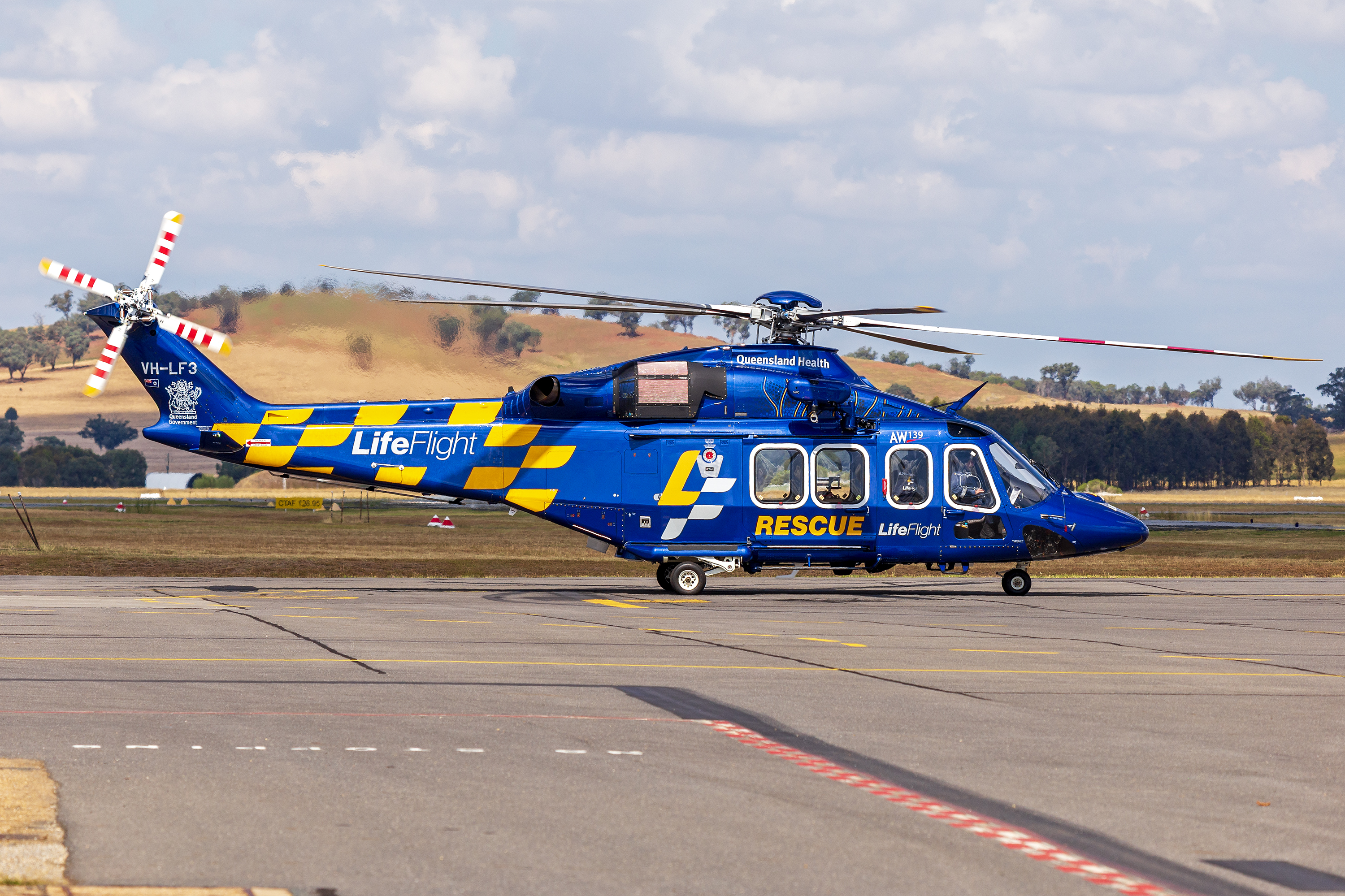
LifeFlight Australia Leonardo AW139 in new livery at Wagga Wagga Airport in March 2025

As of October 2022, the LifeFlight Australia fleet consists of the following aircraft:

Aircraft	In service	Notes
Bell 412 EP	3	VH-XCI currently on contract to Rotor-Lift Aviation on behalf of Ambulance Tasmania.
Agusta AW139	11	VH-PVO, VH-PVQ and VH-PVR operated by StarFlight Australia on behalf of Victoria Police.
Eurocopter AS.350BA	1	
MBB-BK 117	1	
Bombardier CL-600	5	
Total	16	
