= St John Northern Territory =

Australian healthcare organisation

St John NT
- Formation: 1966; 60 years ago
- Type: Non-governmental organisation
- Headquarters: Casuarina, Northern Territory
- Location: Northern Territory, Australia
- Group Chief Executive: Andrew Tombs
- Key people: Roland Chin (Chairman); Thomas Quigley (Chief Medical Officer); Melissa Crompton (Commissioner of Volunteers); Andrew Thomas (Director of Ambulance Services)
- Parent organisation: St John Ambulance Australia
- Affiliations: Order of St John
- Staff: 411 (FY2025)
- Volunteers: 380 (FY2025)
- Website: stjohnnt.org.au

St John Ambulance Northern Territory (St John NT) is a non-profit, charitable organisation providing first aid services and training, urgent care, patient transport, ambulance and other medical services in the Northern Territory. It has served as the primary ambulance service in the Northern Territory since 1966. These services are provided through a combination of paid and volunteer staff. St John NT is funded through a combination of government funding, corporate and private donations and user pays services.

== History ==
A first aid course was held in Darwin in September/October 1915 with successful students being awarded a certificate from the St John Ambulance Association. This certificate would have been issued from one of the southern states.

In 1936, "an ambulance movement was inaugurated in Darwin" and in 1937 a division of the St John Ambulance Brigade was formed. This was a sub-centre under the control of either Victoria or NSW and was short lived. Little is known about this division, apart from the fact of its existence.

After a visit to Darwin in 1946 by Lady Mountbatten, The Commandery of the Australian Commonwealth wrote to the Northern Territory Administration about forming a St John Ambulance Association and later a St John Ambulance Brigade in Darwin. Postwar Darwin was a rather rough place at the time and the enquiry was rebuffed.

In 1952 Mr Charles Bannerman wrote to Sydney HQ about restarting St John Ambulance in Darwin. Around the same time, officers from the Department of Civil Aviation (DCA) were working on forming a branch of the St John Ambulance Brigade. A meeting was held in Darwin on 28 April 1952 with DCA Fire Chief Norman Bradbury elected as president.

Instruction in first aid began almost immediately with certificates being awarded to 18 successful candidates. Bradbury and navy Surgeon Lieut. O’Donoghue conducted first aid courses in Daly Waters, Tennant Creek and Alice Springs. Bradbury started a division in Alice Springs and first aid groups in the other centres. The Alice Springs division closed in 1956 from a lack of community support.

In October 1952, St John in South Australia gave approval for the formation of a St John Ambulance Brigade in Darwin and a division was registered in early 1953. A cadet division was formed in October 1954.

In 1960, an Auxiliary that became a de facto council was formed in Darwin. A further advancement occurred in November 1965 when a Branch Council of the Order of St John was formed, making the NT a separate sub-District of St John Ambulance, South Australia. The Administrator of the NT became the Council President and officers of the auxiliary, councillors.

As early as 1971 the Department of Health was considering that St John should operate the full Darwin ambulance service, which would need paid staff. Discussions in August 1974 resulted in plans for St John to take over the full service by 1 July 1975. Then along came a cyclone called Tracy. On the night of 24/25 December 1974, Darwin was devastated by the cyclone and on Christmas Day, St John Ambulance took control of all ambulance services in Darwin, including ambulances belonging to the Department of Health.

A full-time manager and a training officer were employed in August 1975 with the first paid ambulance officers starting in February 1976. These included the first two full-time female ambulance officers in Australia. Ambulances operated similar to before Tracy, with paid staff working normal hours week days and volunteers after hours and weekends. The communications centre was operated 24/7 by paid staff. Many staff were also volunteers and worked nights and weekends unpaid.

St John took over the ambulance service from the Department of Health in Alice Springs and in Tennant Creek on 1 July 1979. Paid staff operated weekdays with volunteers at nights and weekends. Declining numbers meant that volunteer ambulance shifts were gradually phased out in all Territory centres.

New adult divisions started in Adelaide River and Batchelor in 1973, at Casuarina in 1976 and at Ayers Rock in 1979. Cadet divisions were formed at Casuarina for boys in 1971 and for girls in 1973. A combined cadet division began in Alice Springs in 1977.

St John Ambulance in the Northern Territory gained independence from South Australia when the brigade was granted full district status on 30 September 1976, and the last tie was cut when the St John Council was presented a new constitution on 16 July 1977.

== Resources ==
At 31 July 2025, the St John NT workforce comprised 411 paid staff members and 380 volunteers. In addition to emergency ambulance services, St John NT also provides:

- first aid training and products
- Event Health Services at community and public events
- help during natural disasters

=== Vehicles ===
St John NT employs various vehicles in their fleet. Of the most common of ambulances is the Mercedes-Benz Sprinter which serves as the organisation's primary means of emergency patient transport. The Toyota Fortuner is used as Critical Response vehicles and command cars, while the Toyota Land Cruiser is used in remote and rugged areas. Two Ford Ranger Operational Support Vehicles are in service equipped to manage mass-casualty incidents in remote areas. The service is also introducing Toyota HiAce vans fitted with suspension lifts, bull bars, and a 4x4 conversion for Nhulunbuy and other remote areas.

== Communications ==
The St John Emergency Communications Centre (ECC) operates out of the Joint Emergency Services Communications Centre (JESCC). St John uses the Northern Territory Police Force Computer-aided dispatch system. This service also coordinates responses outside of ambulance response areas within the NT.

== Volunteer ==
The first Northern Territory volunteer division was formed in Darwin in late 1952 and has been serving the Northern Territory community since, ensuring that members of the public have access to First Aid services at a range of community and public events.

The current Commissioner of Volunteers is Melissa Crompton.
