= History of the Queensland Police =

History of law enforcement for Queensland, Australia

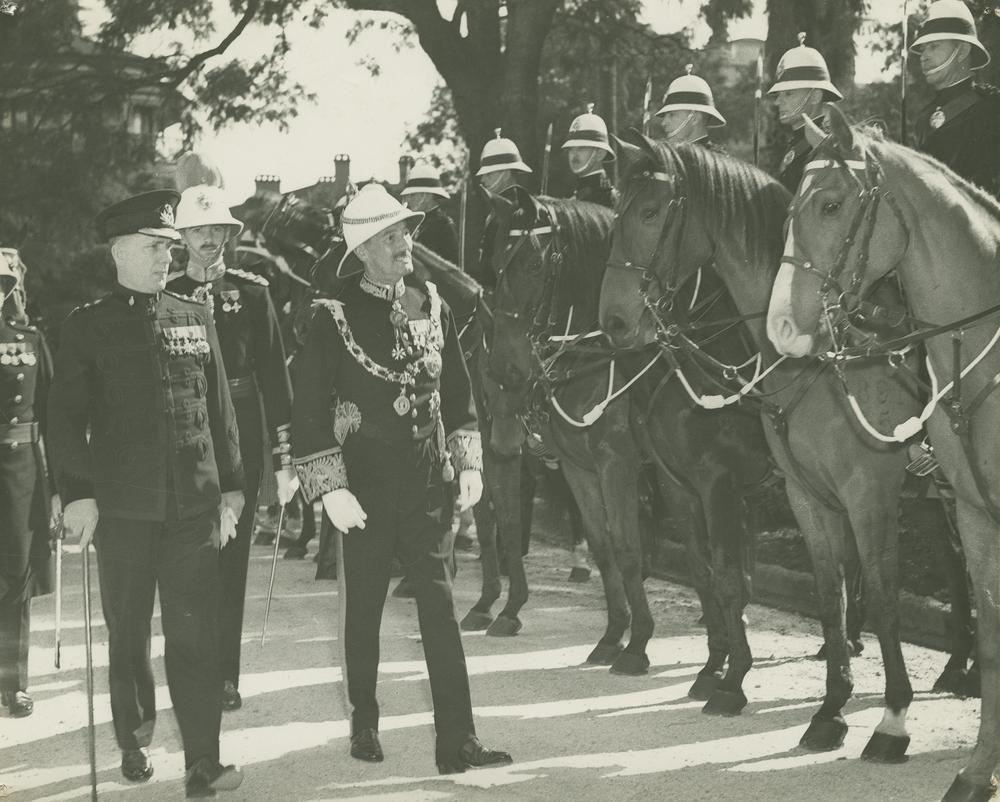
Governor of Queensland inspecting the mounted police, Brisbane, circa 1940

The history of the Queensland Police Service in Queensland, Australia, commenced in 1864, five years after the Separation of Queensland from New South Wales in 1859. This timeline highlights significant developments in Queensland policing.

== 1860s ==
The uniform worn by Queensland police officers after separation in 1859 was a dark blue jacket and top with a forage cap, supplied by the New South Wales police.

=== 1864 ===
The Queensland Police Force was established by the Queensland Government on 1 January 1864 with strength of 287 officers serving a population of 61,467. David Thompson Seymour appointed as Acting Commissioner and later as Commissioner.

Transport in the settled areas was mainly by foot and in the unsettled areas by horse.

The hulk Margaret Eliza was purchased for £3000. It was refitted and renamed the Proserpine. She was used as a floating water police office, prison, and later as a reformatory school.

Correspondence with the Police Commissioner or between stations was by handwritten letter, moved by horse or Cobb and Co stagecoach, or by telegram.

Finding that no written instructions had ever been issued for the guidance of the police, Commissioner Seymour issues "Rules for the General Government and Discipline of members of the Police Force of Queensland" based upon the Victorian police model.

On 1 December, the Detective Office was created with Sub-Inspector George Elliott in charge.

At December 1864, in the first year of operation of the Queensland Police Force, there were 27 ordinary police stations with 151 foot and mounted officers, and 16 native police camps of 136 European officers and indigenous troopers. Twenty of the 'ordinary police force' stations averaged four officers each, the bigger stations like Brisbane, Ipswich, Rockhampton and Maryborough had larger staff numbers. Native police camps averaged between 7 and 17 men, large camps like Rockhampton could have up to 27 men of both officers and troopers.

=== 1865 ===
Police Commissioner David Seymour described the lack of accommodation for police: "Many men are compelled to live in lodgings, and in the country districts constables live in public-houses some distance from the lock-up at times making them unavailable for sudden emergencies".

Police Commissioner Seymour focussed on the crime of bushranging and took active measures to hasten the capture of these criminals through the purchase of fresh police horses and the construction of securely fenced paddocks at every police station.

Water police were stationed on board the hulk Proserpine at the mouth of the Brisbane River.

Revolvers were supplied to every police station and 50 breech-loading carbines were delivered to the Department.

=== 1866 ===
The Bread or Blood riot started, threatening the sacking of Government House in Brisbane. Hundreds of government officials were sworn in as special constables to assist police.

The first uniform consisted of a Garibaldi jacket of dark blue, serge wool cloth, red facings, and shoulder knot; trousers of the same material, with red cord, and a high cap with French peak.

=== 1867 ===
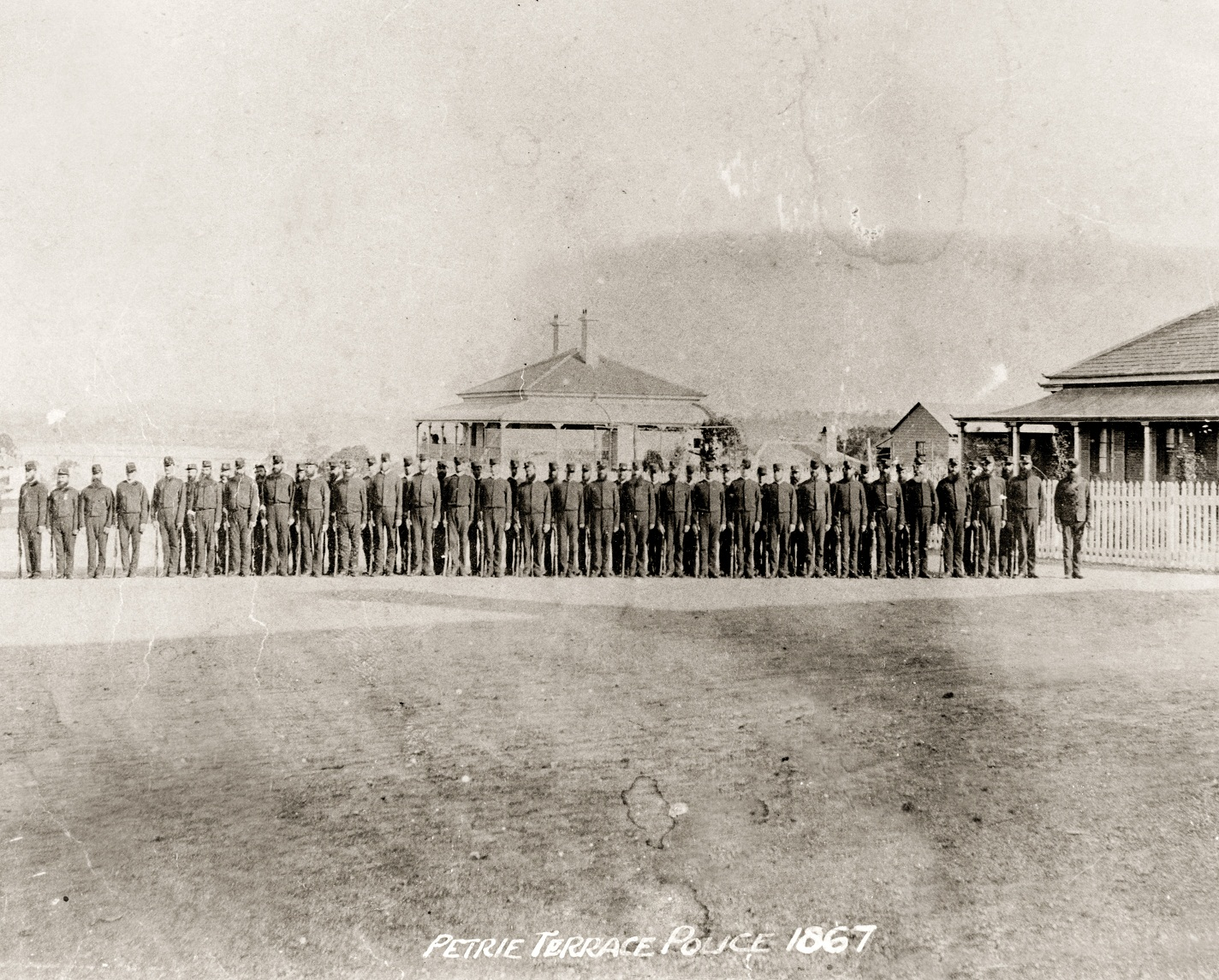
Police at Petrie Terrace, 1867

On 6 November 1867 Constable Patrick William Cahill and Constable John Francis Power were poisoned and shot in the head at the MacKenzie River Crossing while escorting a consignment of bank notes and bullion from Rockhampton to Clermont. The first major test for the Detective Office was to solve their murders.

Police Commissioner Seymour stated that "men at all stations are, when practicable, to be drilled once a week".

=== 1869 ===
The publication of "Rules for the General Government and Discipline of members of the Police Force of Queensland" was approved, printed and distributed.

Each constable required one pair of handcuffs as part of his equipment allotment.

== 1870s ==
Navy blue helmets were introduced and proved to be a very hot choice of headwear; they were phased out in favour of white helmets in 1896.

=== 1870 ===
A police barracks was established in George Street, Brisbane, on the site of the old convict hospital.

Changes to rank insignia were implemented which among other things meant that an acting sergeant would be called a senior constable.

=== 1872 ===
A general order was issued that the Chinese had as much right on the gold fields as Europeans, so long as they had a miners' permit. If a collision resulted in a riot which the police could not quell, they were to note the ring-leaders and apprehend them.

=== 1873 ===
Sub-Inspector Robert Johnstone, officer in charge of native police, accompanied explorer George Dalrymple on the north-east coast expedition to explore the coastal lands as far as Cooktown.

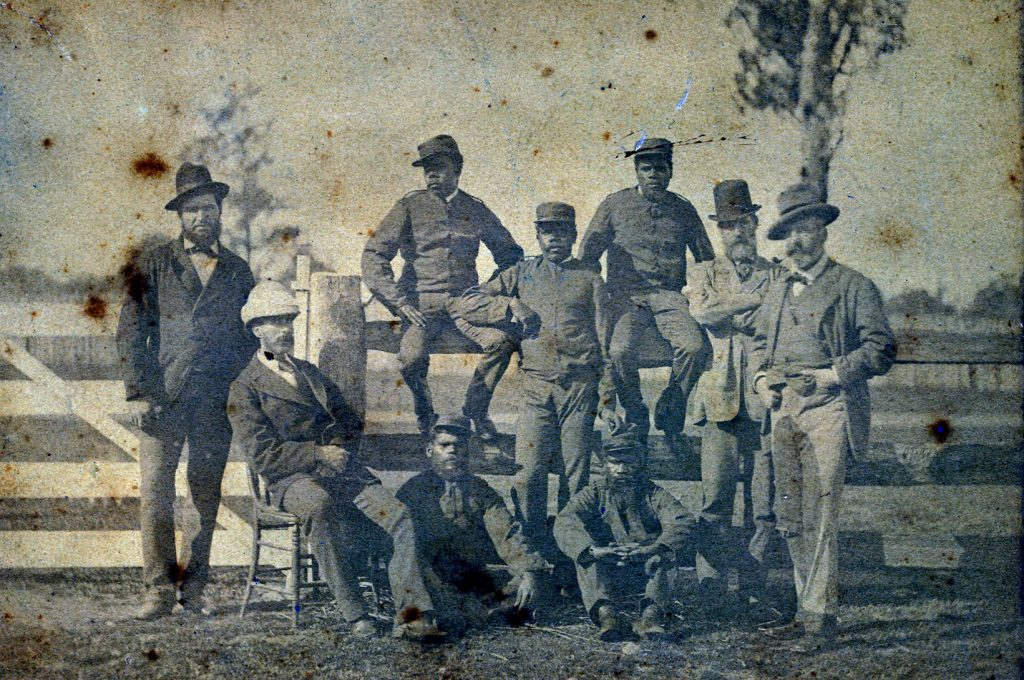
A contingent of Queensland Police Trackers were sent to Victoria to help in the hunt for the Kelly Gang in 1879. The Trackers along with Queensland and Victorian police officers pose in Benalla Police Paddock. Back Row L-R: Senior Constable Tom King (Standing); Troopers Jimmy, Hero and Barney and Victorian Police Superintendent J. Sadlier. Front Row L-R: Queensland Sub-Inspector Stanhope O'Connor, Troopers Johnny and Jack and Victoria Police Commissioner, Captain Frederick Charles Standish (hands in pockets)

=== 1875 ===
The bulk of the Queensland Police force moved from the Brisbane CBD to Victoria Barracks and occupies the army buildings on site.

Three movable houses and twelve large frame-tents were built in Brisbane and shipped to the Palmer River gold-field. They were quickly erected by two constables and could house six officers.

=== 1876 ===
The Police Manual instructed constables on beat duty to "possess such knowledge of the inhabitants of each house as to enable them to recognise their persons; and thus prevent mistakes, and be enabled to render assistance, when called upon, to the inhabitants".

"Instructions for the Guidance of the Police" were published and a system of competitive examination for promotion was introduced, intended to increase police efficiency.

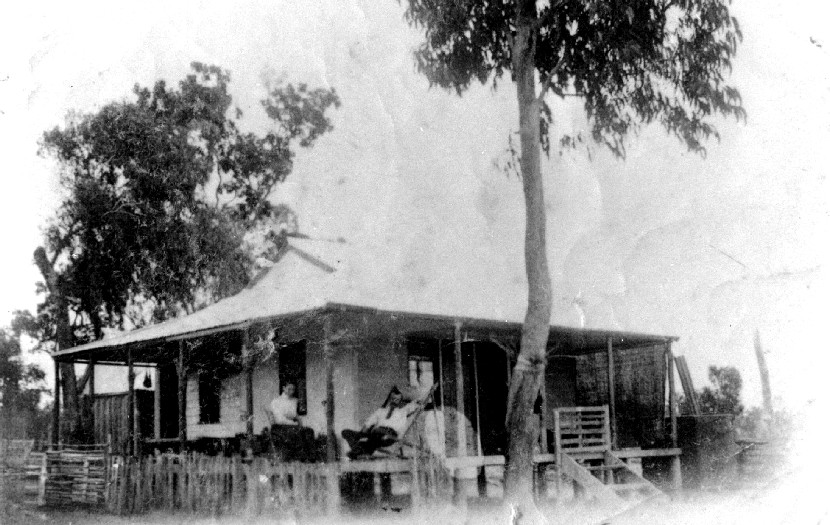
Constable Daniel Fitzgibbon and his wife relax on the verandah of the Laura Police residence, 1906

=== 1877 ===
Laura Police Station opened in 1877 with Sub-Inspector 1/c Hervey Fitzgerald in charge. As at 2019, it was still a single officer station today and was staffed by a senior constable.

=== 1879 ===
Roma Street Police Barracks were built and provided accommodation for about forty-five men, room for an Officer-in-Charge and two cells.

A contingent of trackers was sent to Victoria to assist in the hunt for the Kelly Gang.

== 1880s ==
=== 1880 ===
At Birdsville, locally available cane grass was used on police station walls for its insulation properties and longevity.

Native Police camp accommodation was constructed using a variety of materials, such as saplings, logs, bark, canvas and shingles.

=== 1881 ===
On 24 January Sub-Inspector George Dyas was found buried after being killed by being speared in the back by Aboriginals while he camped near the 40 Mile Waterhole near Normanton.

On 24 September Sub-Inspector Henry Kaye died from being speared through the chest by Aboriginals at Woolgar gold fields (100 kilometres (62 mi) north of Richmond).

=== 1882 ===
Sub-Inspector 1/c Alexander Douglas was sent to Herberton and with four troopers, two old gold diggers and five Chinese men; he blazed a trail from Herberton to Mourilyan. The party travelled without rations and in continuous rain for twenty days, living mainly on roots.

Martini-Henry rifles were purchased to replace the Snider previously used.

=== 1883 ===
The Petrie Terrace Gaol area was taken over by the Queensland Police and became known as the Petrie Terrace Police Depot where prospective police officers were trained.

On 24 January Cadet Sub-Inspector Mark Beresford died after being speared in the thigh and hit on the head by Aboriginals in the Selwyn Ranges to the south of Cloncurry.

On 26 January Constable William Dwyer was struck on the head by a tomahawk and killed by Wild Toby an Aboriginal bushranger, near Juandah Station via Taroom.

=== 1884 ===
Cap badges consisting of a separate district letter and number were issued and remained in use until 1906.

As policing reached across the State more and more stations were opened usually in small towns of less than 300 people or in places that were growing due to the building of train lines or the discovery of gold. By December 1884, twenty years after the inauguration of the Police Force, there were 155 stations with 657 police officers and 182 indigenous troopers and trackers. There was also a growth in the number of single officer stations. In 1884, 36 stations were operated by single police officers, of these 6 were assisted in their duties by an indigenous tracker.

Running a police station with one officer was a daunting task. Often there was no station building and one had to be rented or moves made to purchase something suitable. Married officers were generally not sent to single officer stations as there was generally no accommodation for them in town. However, wives who did join their husbands, found themselves looking after the station and taking inquiries, while her husband was away. Her tasks could also involve feeding and cleaning up after prisoners in the lock-up.

=== 1886 ===
The first six camels arrived in Birdsville from India in poor condition and by July only four had survived. Despite these early setbacks camels proved useful, travelling hundreds of kilometres on duties such as collecting statistical returns.

=== 1887 ===
The first honour given to any Queensland police officer was a Royal Humane Society Bronze Medal awarded to Constable James O"Brien for saving the life of a nine-year-old boy at Ipswich.

During the Burketown cyclone on 5 March, Sergeant John Ferguson's wife kept a lamp burning in the window of the courthouse and her beacon drew many people to the refuge during the storm.

=== 1889 ===
A Royal Commission of Enquiry into the Police Force proposed sweeping changes including that the control of the section of Water Police known as River Police was given back to the Police Commissioner.

The cost of buying ordinary clothing for plain clothes work was an extra burden that detectives had to meet out of their ordinary pay.

There were eleven detectives on the pay-roll across the State. Seven in Brisbane, two in Townsville, and one each in Normanton and Rockhampton.

On 27 October Senior Constable Alfred Wavell was shot and killed at Corinda (southwest of Burketown) by a man who had escaped from the Normanton lock-up.

== 1890s ==
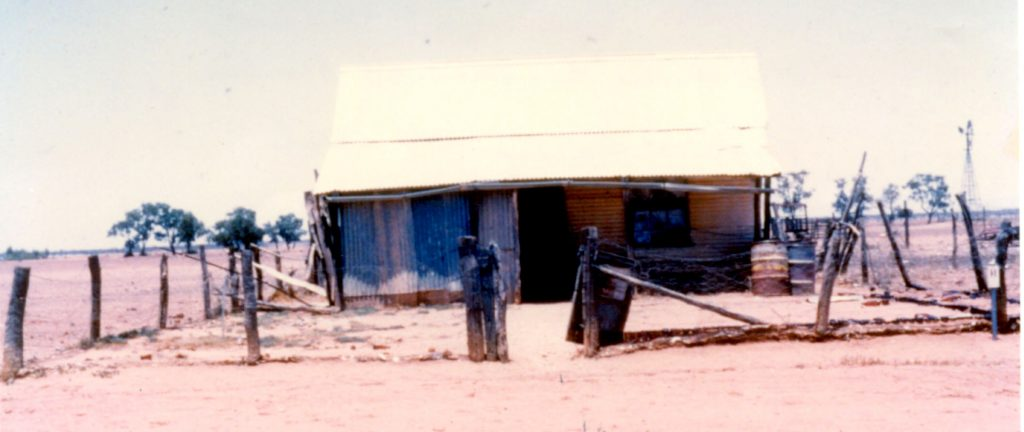
Very first Eromanga police residence built in 1894 so the police officer could bring his wife out to live with him, Photo, circa 1960

=== 1891 ===
Senior Sergeant Martin Breene and Constable Joseph Waters displayed energy and perseverance during the shearer's strikes by following and preventing "fire gangs" from doing damage at Lammermoor pastoral station.

Eromanga Police Station was first opened on 26 September 1891 in a two roomed cottage rented at a cost of five shillings per week, with Senior Constable Manuell in charge. At this time the township consisted of one large store owned by Mr W Paterson, two first class pubs built of brick, and a couple of "humpys". The resident population was about 20 and there was always a number of men from the opal mines and stations "knocking down their cheques" (spending their money) at Eromanga's pubs. Senior Constable Manuell remained in charge of Eromanga until he was instructed to close this station on 31 December 1891, and to proceed to Thargomindah. The station reopened in 1893. In 1894, the first police residence was built so the police officer have his wife live with him. As at 2019, it was still a single officer station and was staffed by a senior constable.

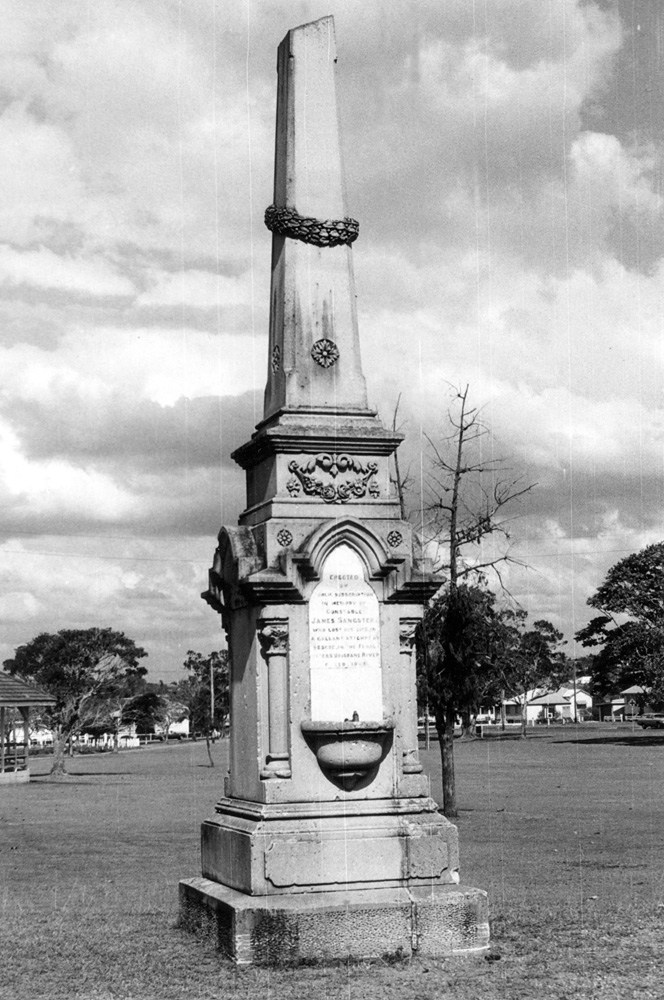
James Sangster Memorial, circa 1940

=== 1893 ===
During the shearer's strike, police were given sole power to "preserve order and secure liberty to all alike".

Acting Sergeant John Raphael Thompson was paid £10 extra to attend to photographic work which included mug shots and crime scene photography.

On 4 February Constable James Sangster, 25, drowned attempting a rescue of two members of the Jackson family during the 1893 flood of the Bremer River at North Ipswich. He is commemorated by the James Sangster Memorial at North Ipswich, which was initiated by the Jackson family and funded by public subscription. The monument has a broken obelisk which symbolises a life cut short.

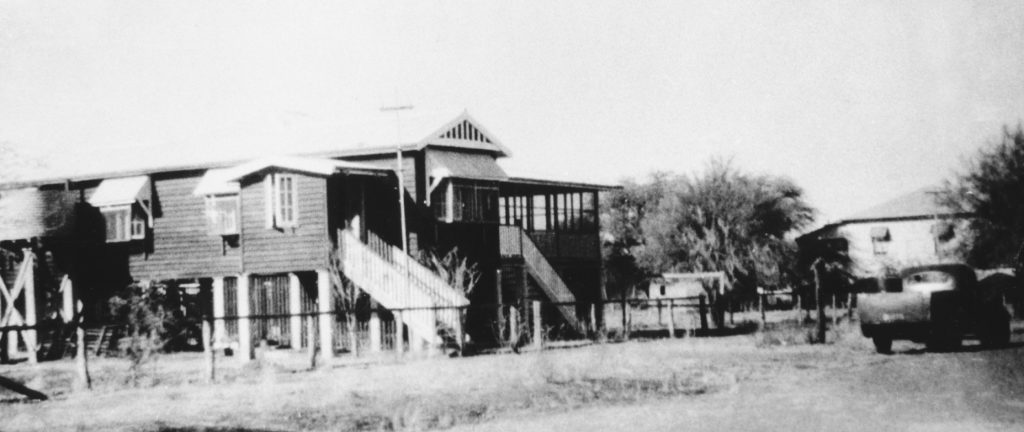
McKinlay police station, circa 1950

MacKinlay (now McKinlay) Police Station was opened in 1893.

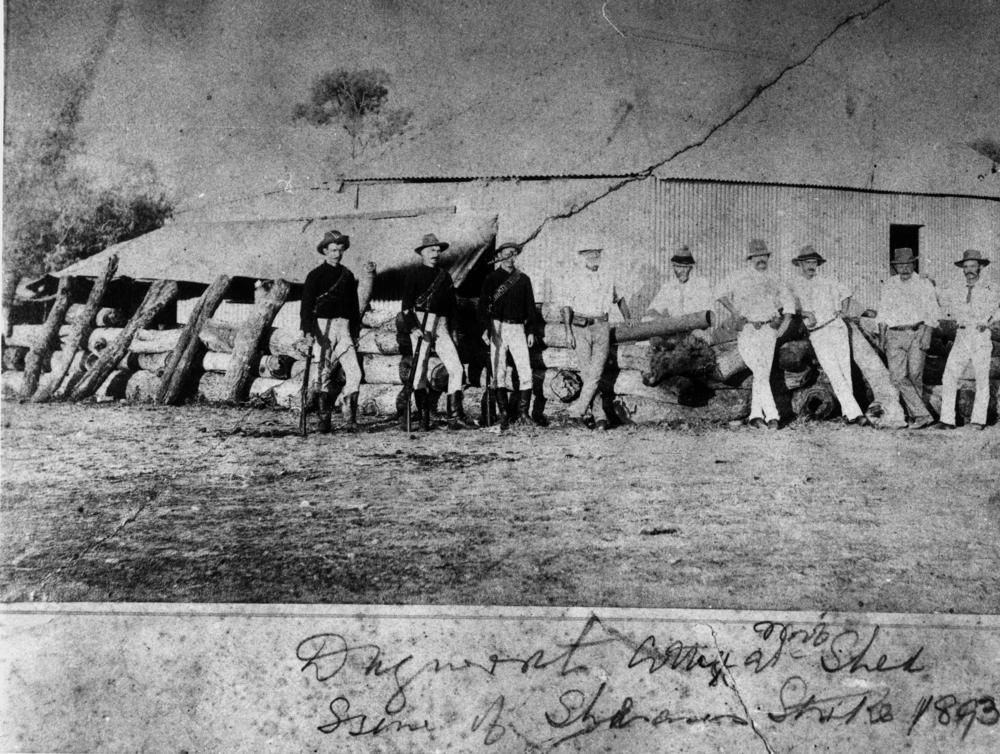
Troopers at Dagworth Station during the shearer's strike in 1894

=== 1894 ===
On 10 May Constable Benjamin Ebbitt died at South Brisbane having never recovered from an assault during an arrest on 9 November 1890 at Croydon.

On 6 September Constable Edward Lanigan was killed by being shot in the chest while trying to prevent another policeman from being shot during an arrest at Montalbion (a mining town near Irvinebank).

=== 1895 ===
On 30 June, Commissioner Seymour retired after 31 years in the job and was replaced by William Edward Parry-Okeden on 1 July. Full control of the water police finally came under the jurisdiction of Police Commissioner.

On 2 July Senior Constable William Conroy died after being stabbed several times trying to prevent a man from stabbing the man's wife on Thursday Island.

The Roma Street police station telephone exchange was connected to fourteen sites including the Woolloongabba and South Brisbane police stations, the Commissioner's house at Red Hill, the Detective Office, the Police Depot and the Central Fire Brigade Station.

=== 1896 ===
The bicycle, as a means of transport was introduced and a slow distribution occurred across the State. At about £13 a bicycle was more expensive than a horse.

Detectives received no special training. Generally, "the smartest and most intelligent" people from among the plain clothes officers in the general police were selected and expected to learn from experience.

The Pearl ferry capsized near the Victoria Bridge on the flooded Brisbane River on Valentine's Day. After the rescue of sixty survivors, police made every effort to recover and identify the bodies of the twenty-nine victims.

A loose tunic was adopted in place of the existing jumper for police uniform. Mounted officers performing mounted duty, wore Bedford cord breeches and black napoleon boots.

=== 1897 ===
The collection housed in the police museum running since 1893, was used to educate recruits about criminal methods.

=== 1899 ===
On the trail of an escapee, Constable James Kenny and four indigenous troopers survived Cyclone Mahina at Bathurst Bay, by staying together after their camp was blown away.

The recruit probation period was increased so that no man was sworn until three months' drill and instruction was completed at the Police Depot.

Englesburg police station was opened on 25 April 1899. The town's name was changed to Kalbar in September 1916 due to anti-German sentiment in World War I.

== 1900s ==
=== 1900 ===
At the turn of the century the Queensland Police Department had 845 police officers and 135 native trackers at 256 stations.

=== 1901 ===
First-Class Constable George Pugh displayed discretion and bravery in the single-handed arrest of three men for the unlawful killing of cattle at the Jundah Opal Fields, and for taking them on foot, the 20 miles (32 km) to Jundah police station.

The Criminal Investigation Branch moved into the old St John's Cathedral synod building on the corner of Elizabeth and George Streets.

=== 1902 ===
The Imperial Service Order and Medal was established by King Edward for the administration and clerical staff of the Civil Service throughout the British Empire for long and meritorious service.

On 30 March, Constable George Doyle was shot and killed while attempting to capture the Kenniff brothers in Upper Warrego, who had a long history of stealing cattle and horses.

=== 1903 ===
In May the Bronze Medal of the Royal Humane Society was awarded to First-class Michael Becher, Inspector Percy Galbraith, Constables Charles Pinwill and William Ryan who risked their own lives to save the lives of others between 12 November 1889 and 15 January 1903.

On 29 March Acting Sergeant David Johnston was killed by being hit on the head with an axe by a prisoner in the watchhouse at Mackay.

=== 1904 ===
The Fingerprint Bureau was established. During the first year of operation 578 fingerprints were taken and 226 came from other states.

On 16 September 1904, Constable First Class Charles O'Kearney was knocked down and killed by a horse being deliberately ridden towards him in retaliation for an arrest in Laidley.

=== 1905 ===
William Geoffrey Cahill became the third police commissioner on 1 April 1905.

On 23 December Constable Albert Price was stabbed and killed while making an arrest at Mackay.

=== 1906 ===
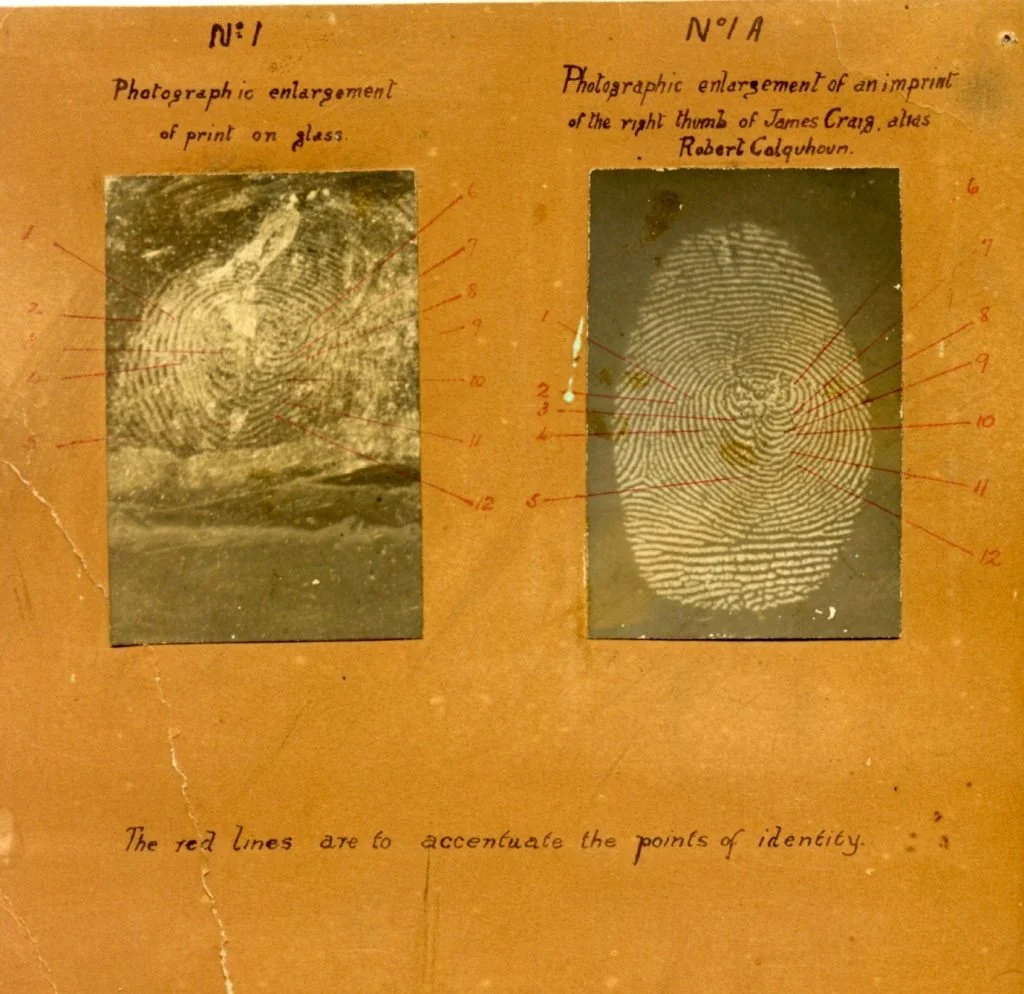
First fingerprint evidence in Queensalnd, February 1906

In February 1906, the police used fingerprint evidence for the first time, when Acting Sergeant Dundown Fowler compared a fingerprint on a beer bottow with the fingergprint of James Craig’s inked right thumb.

Queensland Police Medal for Merit

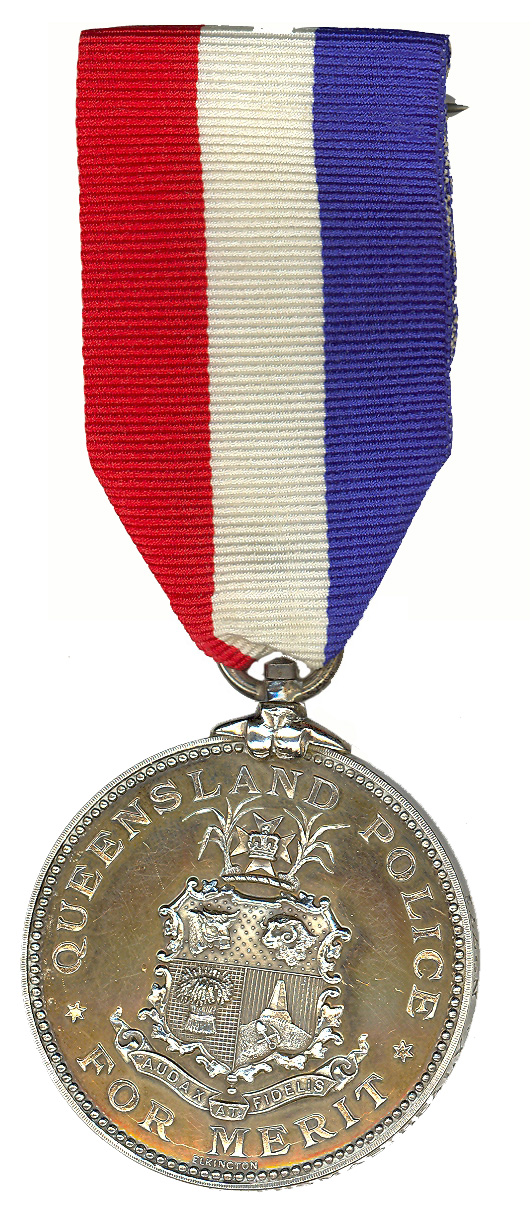
Queensland Police Medal for Merit (reverse)

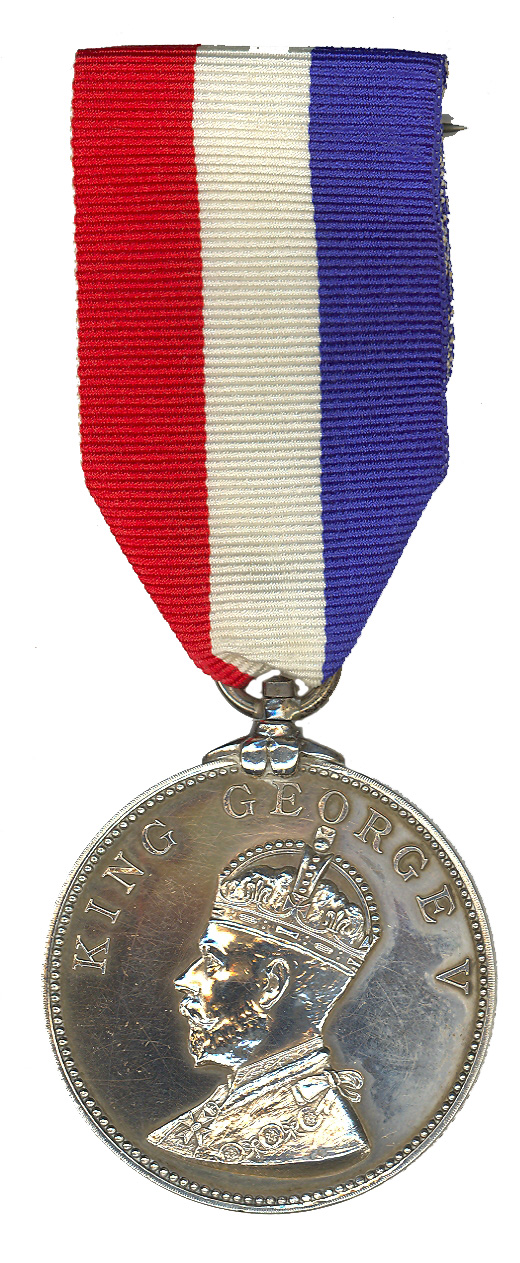
Queensland Police Medal for Merit (obverse)

On 27 September 1906: Sergeant Thomas Heaney died at South Brisbane from head fractures sustained when he was hit multiple times over the head with a metal bar during an arrest on 7 June 1905 at Woolloongabba, Brisbane.

On 4 October Police Commissioner Cahill announced the establishment of a Medal for Merit departmental award for police officers who displayed pre-eminent bravery on duty. The first two medals were awarded to Acting Sergeant John Hennessy and Constable Richard Runge on 12 October.

Queensland police enforced the Infant Life Protection Act 1905 by checking the registration of births and the deaths of illegitimate children.

=== 1907 ===
The Patrol was the first motorised vessel used by the Brisbane Water Police. She was capable of 8 knots (15 km/h; 9.2 mph).

Constable Charles Watson and a tracker followed suspected murderer J. W. Patterson for 350 miles (560 km). They captured the fugitive but had very little food or water for the last 100 miles (160 km) of the chase.

A new Figure-of-8 style handcuff was introduced.

In 1907, Police Commissioner William Cahill and the Deputy Queensland Government Architect, designed the Queensland Police Station badge based on the police cap badge of the time. Prior to this time, there was no standard way to indicate a police station.

=== 1909 ===
A very fine 78,000-acre (32,000 ha) reserve called Rewan was proclaimed as a stud farm for breeding police horses. The Woodford mares and foals as well as two purchased stallions, "Libertine" and "Mack" populated the reserve.

Very few police stations have a typewriter and some officers use their own to complete reports and correspondence.

The King's Police Medal was instituted by King Edward VII on 7 July to be awarded to those officers of properly recognised police forces and fire brigades under the jurisdiction of the sovereign, who showed distinguished service and conspicuous devotion to duty, or who carried out heroic acts of courage. First awarded to Constable John Bourke on 29 August 1911.

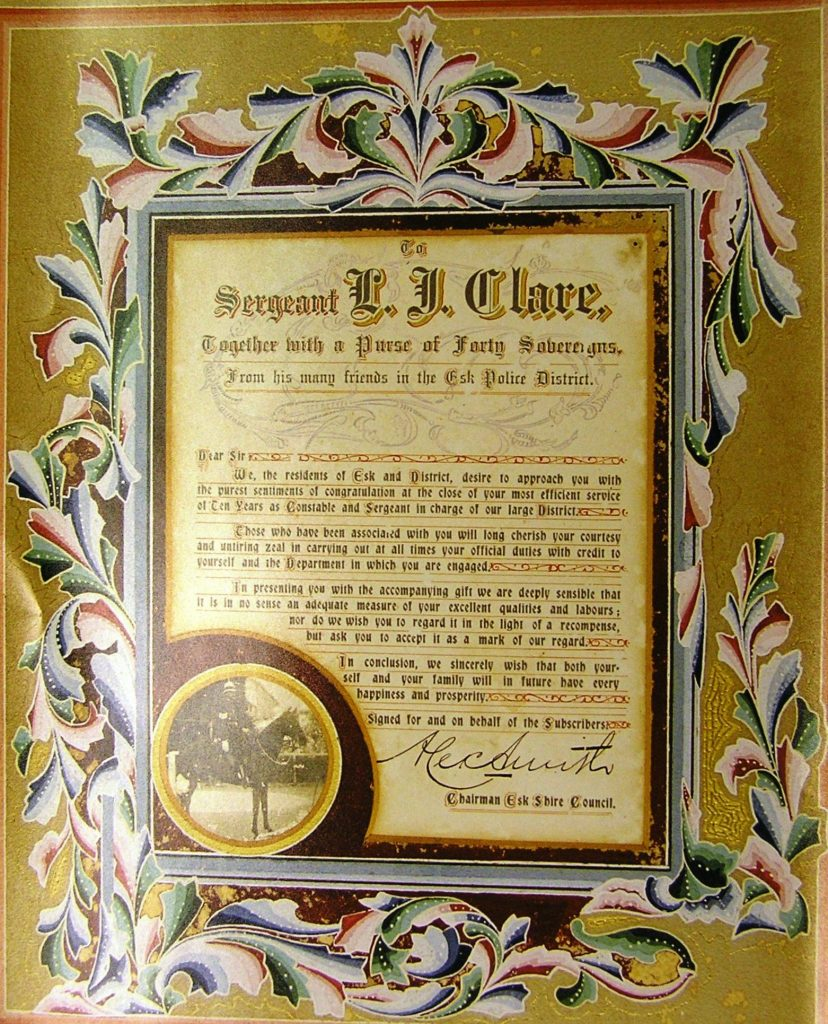
Highly decorated missive presented to Sergeant Lawrence Clare by the citizens of the Esk District when he was transferred in March 1909

The good will of the community was necessary if an officer was to be able to carry out his duties effectively while in town and to then to be confident that nothing untoward would happen while he was away checking the rest of his beat by horse. Communities were often loath to let an officer go when he was transferred away and often took up petitions and wrote letters to the Police Commissioner begging for the officer to remain in town. Long standing officers were often presented with gifts and highly decorated letters of thanks from their community. When Sergeant Lawrence Clare was transferred in March 1909, the citizens of the Esk District expressed their thanks:

To

Sergeant L. J. Clare

Together with a Purse of Forty Sovereigns

From his many friends in the Esk Police District

Dear Sir

We, the residents of Esk and District, desire to approach you with the purest sentiments of congratulation at the close of your most efficient service of Ten Years as Constable and Sergeant in charge of our large District. Those who have been associated with you will long cherish your courtesy and untiring zeal in carrying out at all times your official duties with credit to yourself and the Department in which you are engaged. In presenting you with the accompanying gift we are deeply sensible that it is in no sense an adequate measure of your excellent qualities and labours; nor do we wish you to regard it in the light of a recompense but ask you to accept it as a mark of our regard. In conclusion, we sincerely wish that both yourself and your family will in future have every happiness and prosperity.

Signed for on behalf of the Subscribers.

Alex Smith, Chairman Esk Shire Council

== 1910s ==
=== 1910 ===
Inspector White reported that nearly every station within a five-mile radius of the centre of Brisbane was connected by telephone.

Chief Inspector Urquhart favourably mentioned Constable Peter Hagarty of Finch Hatton: "he is an exceptional good man in a rough place among a very rough class of people. He made seventy-one arrests single handed this year and is most highly spoken of by the respectable portion of the community".

=== 1911 ===
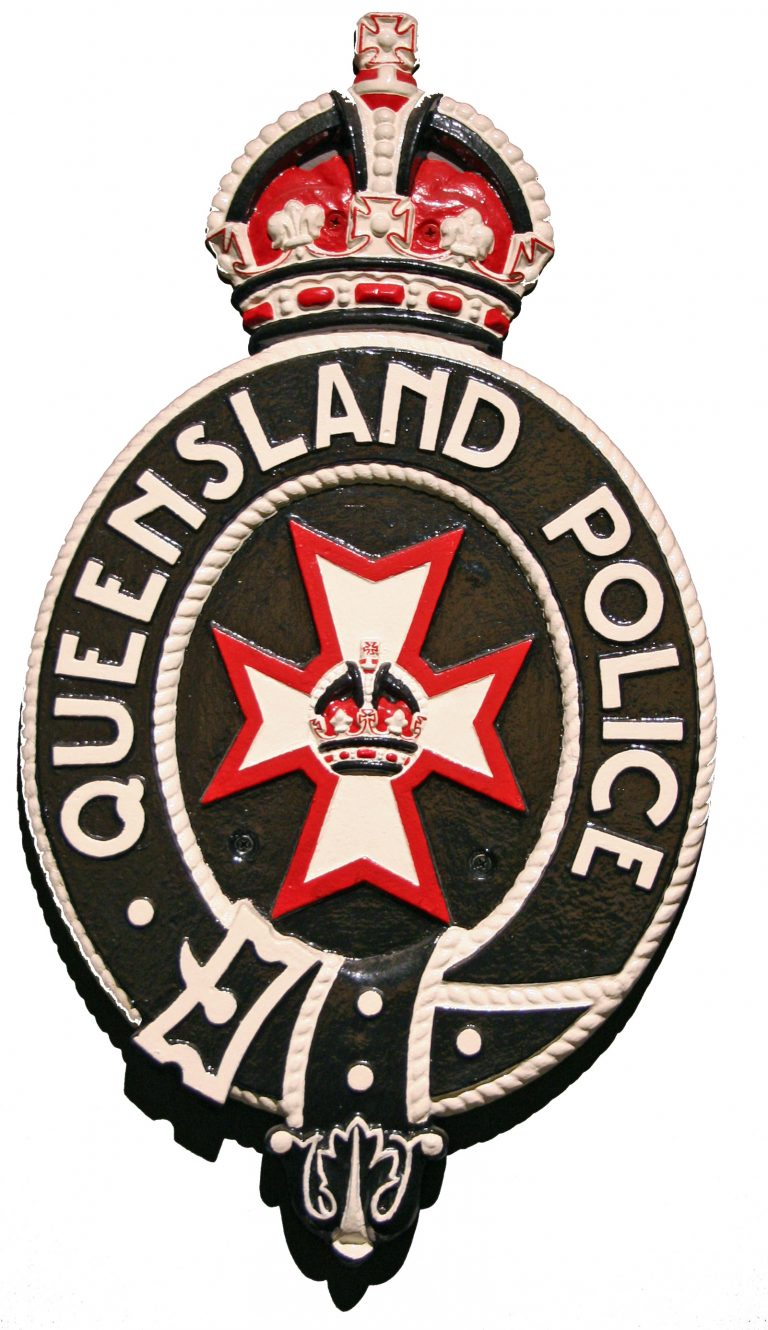
This cast iron Queensland Police Station Badge was used as a station identifier between 1911 and 1958

In 1911, 300 cast iron station badges, each weighing 17 pounds (7.7 kg) and costing £0/4/10, were manufactured for the Police Department by Harvey & Son, Globe Iron Works, Brisbane and distributed as identification badges to every police station in Queensland.

First reference to the idea of women police was made by the National Council of Women of Queensland.

=== 1912 ===
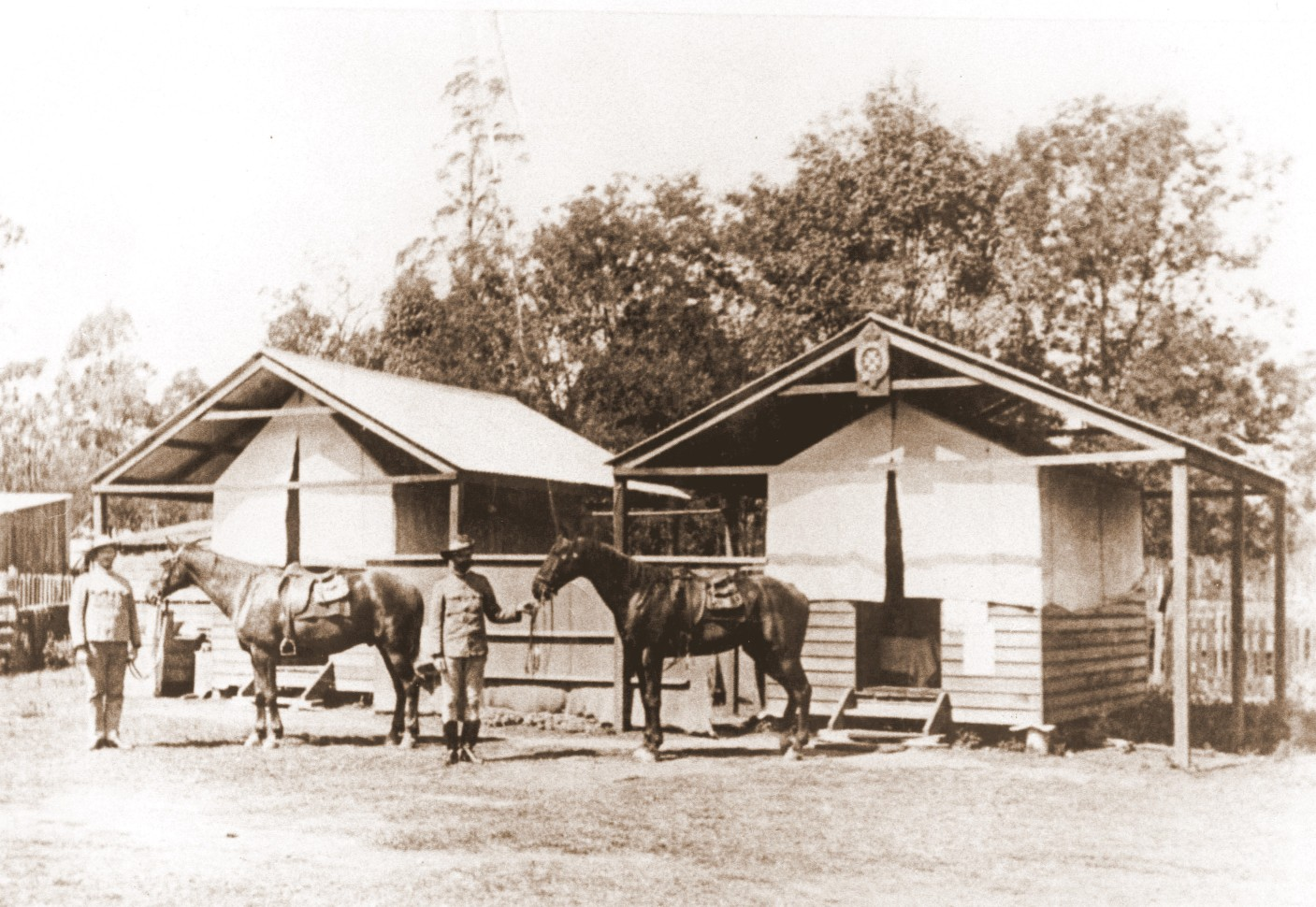
Blackbutt Police Station, 1912. Note the station badge attached to the peak of the right hand tent.

The 1912 Brisbane general strike started as a tramway strike but gains momentum with 20,000 or more people withholding their labour and brings industry to a standstill. Mass rallies see police numbers bolstered by the swearing in of 3,000 special constables.

=== 1914 ===
Police stations serve a variety of local community needs and police officers were expected to act in extraneous roles as representatives for the government. World War I begins.

=== 1915 ===
Police Commissioner Cahill rejects the idea of employing women following an inquiry by the Acting Home Secretary.

=== 1916 ===
The strength of the Force on 30 June, was 1037 general police, 30 Criminal Investigation Branch officers, 11 water police officers, 99 indigenous police, 27 recruits and 89 on leave with the Commonwealth Military Forces on active service in World War I.

At 13 July, four-year old Nicholas Frousheger wandered away from his home about 3 miles (4.8 km) south of Charleville. The media reports that "the police, and a large party of civilians are trying hard to overtake him, but it is difficult owing to the stony ridges and the light imprint left by the little one".

=== 1917 ===
Frederic Charles Urquhart becomes the fourth Police Commissioner on 1 January 1917.

=== 1918 ===
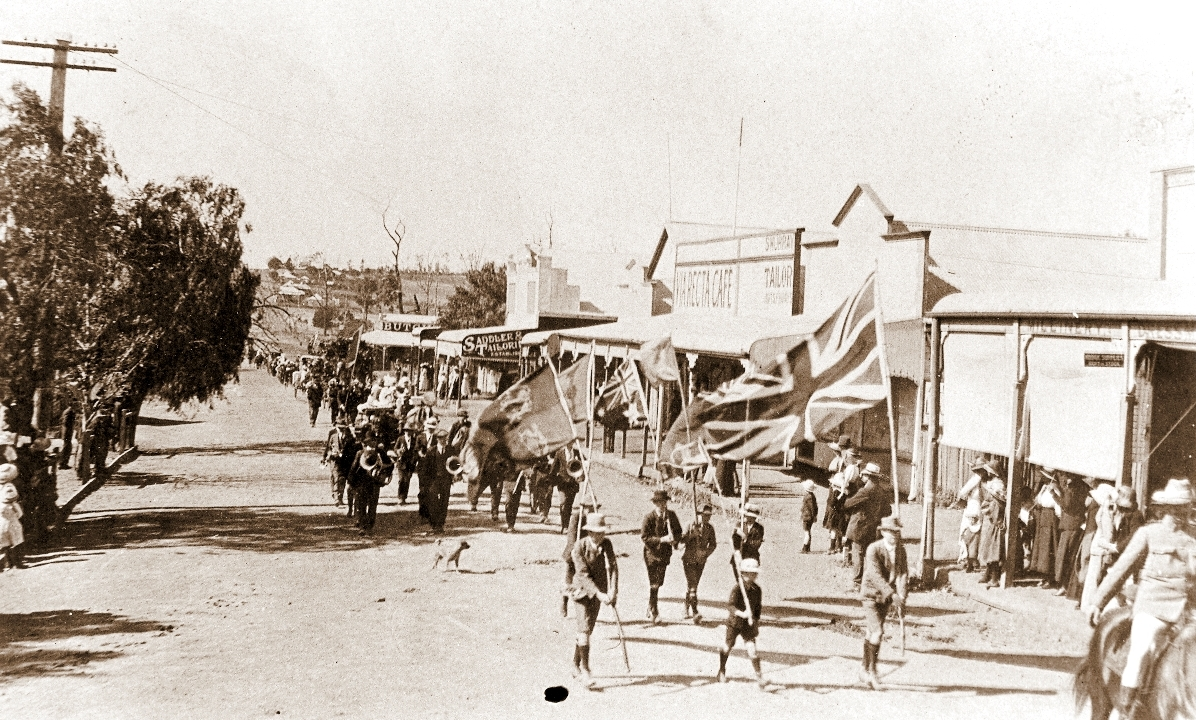
Constable George Chatfield heads up a peace procession in Kalbar to celebrate the end of First World War, 1918

World War I ends.

=== 1919 ===
On 24 March, 8,000 soldiers and conservatives march on the Russian émigré headquarters at South Brisbane which leads to violent clashes between protestors and police. This uprising was known as the Red Flag Riots or Red Monday.

== 1920s ==
=== 1920 ===
Bicycles, not cars, were the usual means of transportation used by police for the prevention and detection of crime. Police Commissioner Ryan establishes bicycle patrols so that plain clothes officers could keep the suburbs of Brisbane under surveillance at night time.

=== 1921 ===
An explosion at Mount Mulligan Colliery entombs over seventy miners. Residents, men from a neighbouring mine assist Constable James O'Dwyer in efforts to recover deceased miners.

Patrick Short became the fifth Police Commissioner on 16 January 1921.

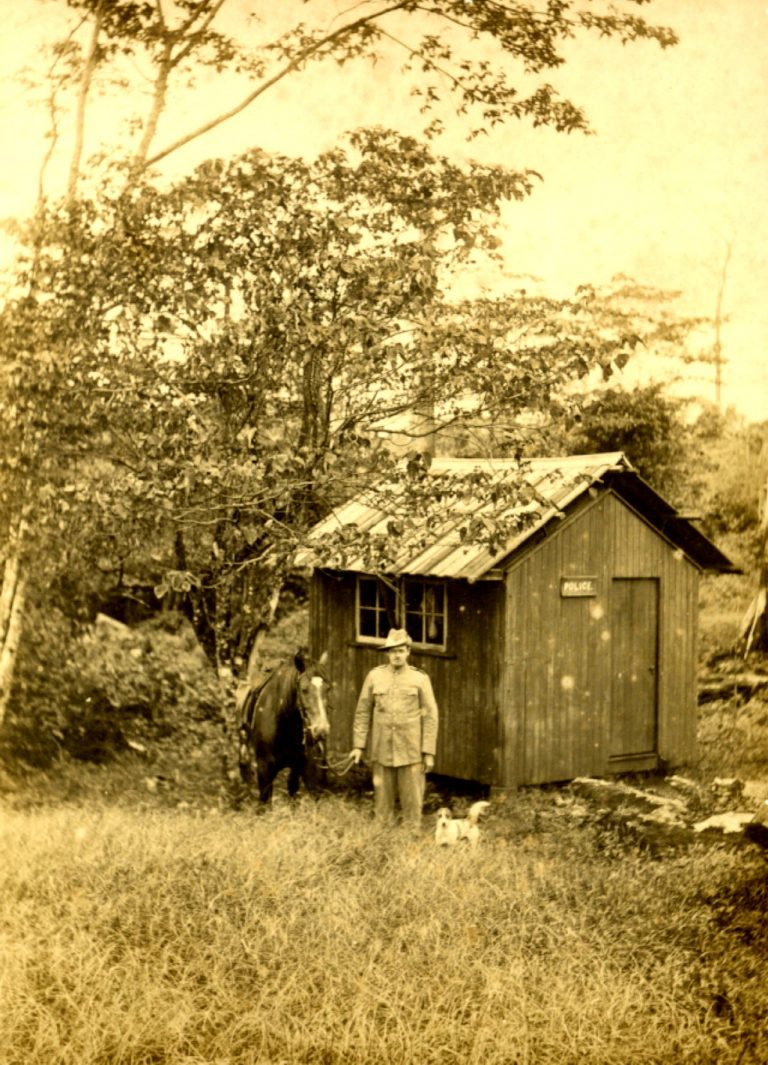
First officer to be stationed at Millaa-Millaa, Constable Daniel Dwyer, standing beside his horse, with his dog at heel, 1922

=== 1922 ===
Millaa Millaa police station opened in 1922. The first officer to be stationed at Millaa Millaa was Constable Daniel Dwyer. As at 2019, it was still a single officer station and was staffed by a senior constable.

=== 1924 ===
The first thorough revision of "Rules for the general government and discipline of the members of the Police Force of Queensland" was completed.

=== 1925 ===
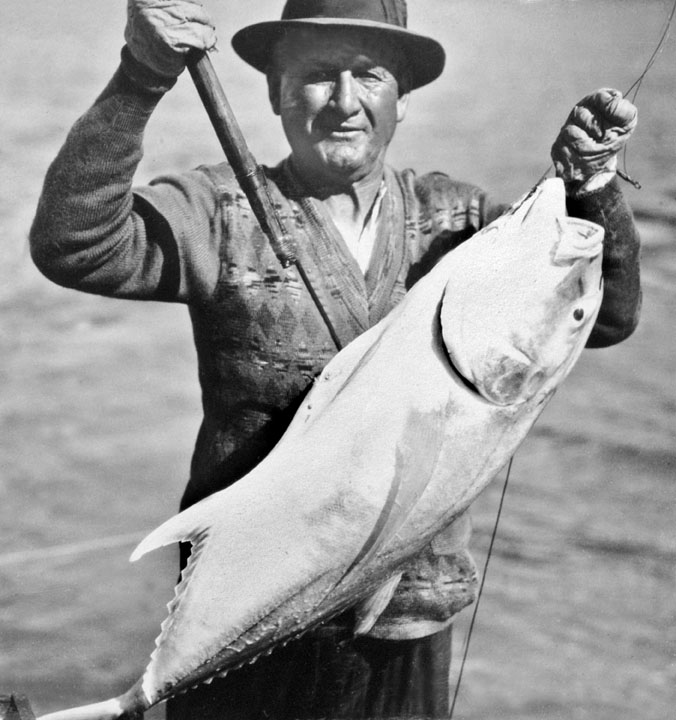
Police Commissioner, William Harold Ryan catches a fish in the Linne Passage, circa 1931

779 horses were in service, three camels were obtained for Noccundra police station and three new Harley-Davidson motorcycles with side cars were purchased.

William Harold Ryan becomes the sixth Police Commissioner on 15 January 1925.

=== 1926 ===
The first two motorised vehicles were Black Marias or prison vans, one of which utilised the body from a horse-drawn prison van on the back of a Bean truck chassis.

=== 1927 ===
The Criminal Investigation Branch building in Queen's Park was blown up by a criminal intent on destroying the evidence against him.

Retired Sergeant 2/c William Lynam had the job of burying seventeen Ingham flood victims, men, women, and children of three Italian families "on the nearest patch of dry land I could find".

Dustcoats and overalls were worn by members of the Criminal Investigation Branch when riding on motorcycles to prevent dust and oil from staining clothing.

=== 1928 ===
There was only one detective available to handle criminal investigations between Townsville and Cloncurry.

=== 1929 ===
Inspector Loch described Cecil Plains as "a large pastoral and farming district with large areas of thickly timbered and pear infested ground that gives stock thieves excellent opportunity to carry out their work".

== 1930s ==
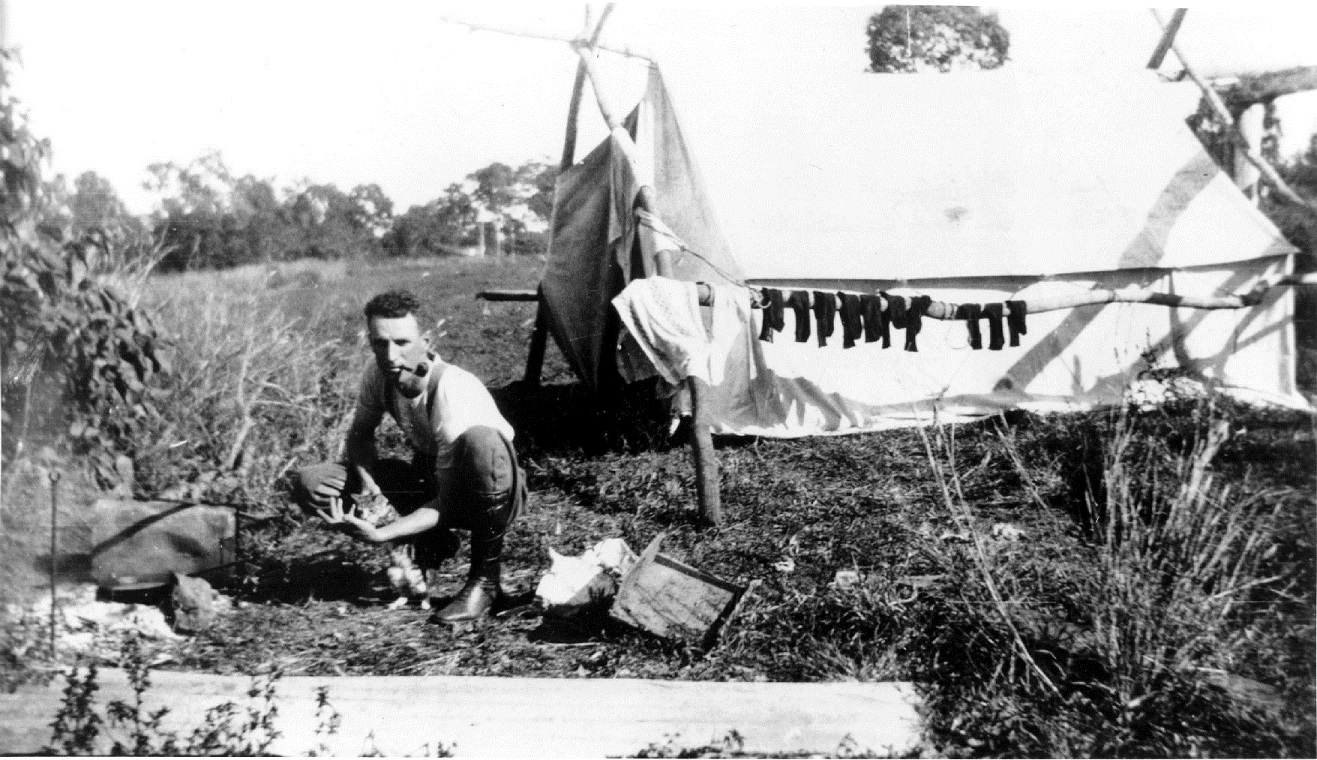
Constable Ernest Dawson playing with a cat at a camp near Ayr, circa 1930

=== 1930 ===
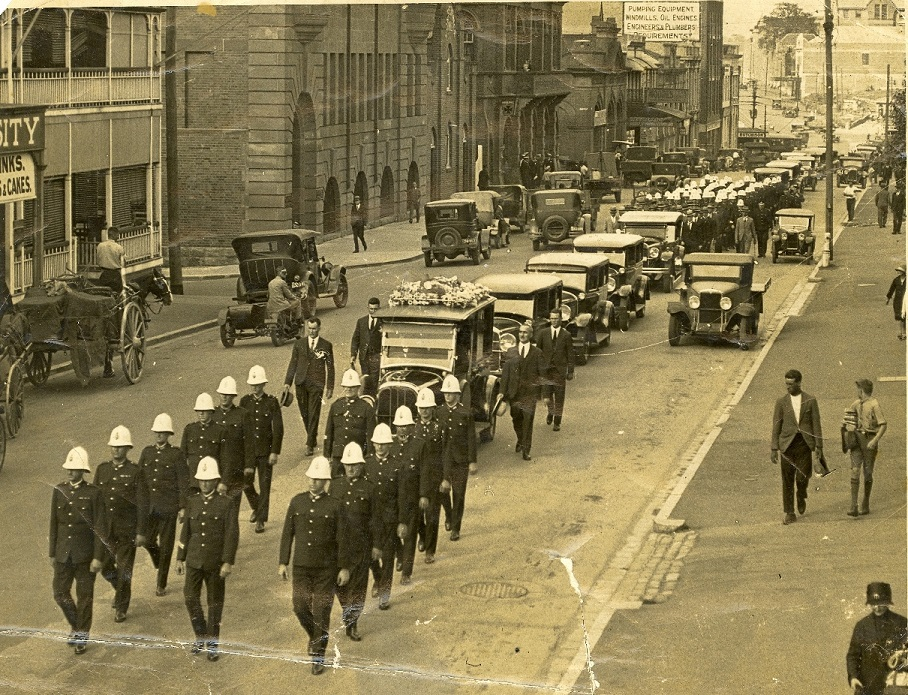
Funeral procession for Constable Ernest Dawson, 1931

On 6 August 1930 Constable Ernest James Dawson was on traffic duty on the Yungaburra Road near Lake Barrine when he lost control of his motorcycle. Despite emergency surgery which appeared initially successful, complications arose and he died in Brisbane General Hospital on 18 January 1931. There was a huge funeral procession in his honour on 19 January 1931.

=== 1931 ===
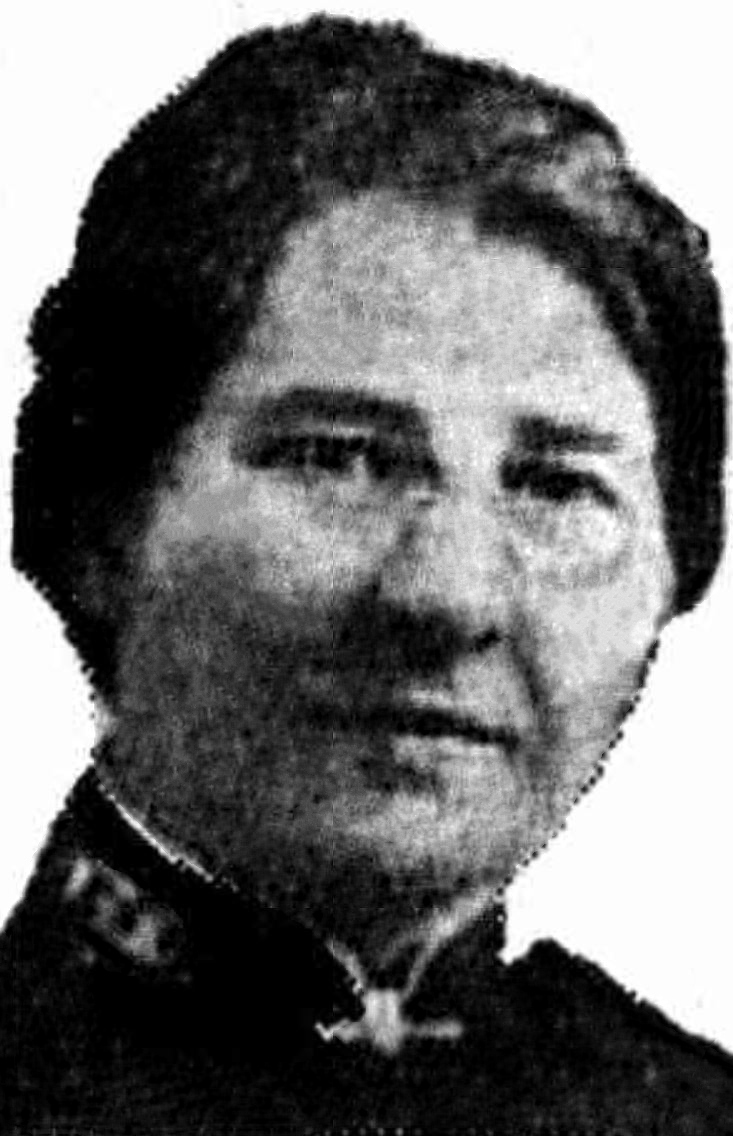
Zara Dare, one of the first two women appointed to the Queensland Police Force, 1931

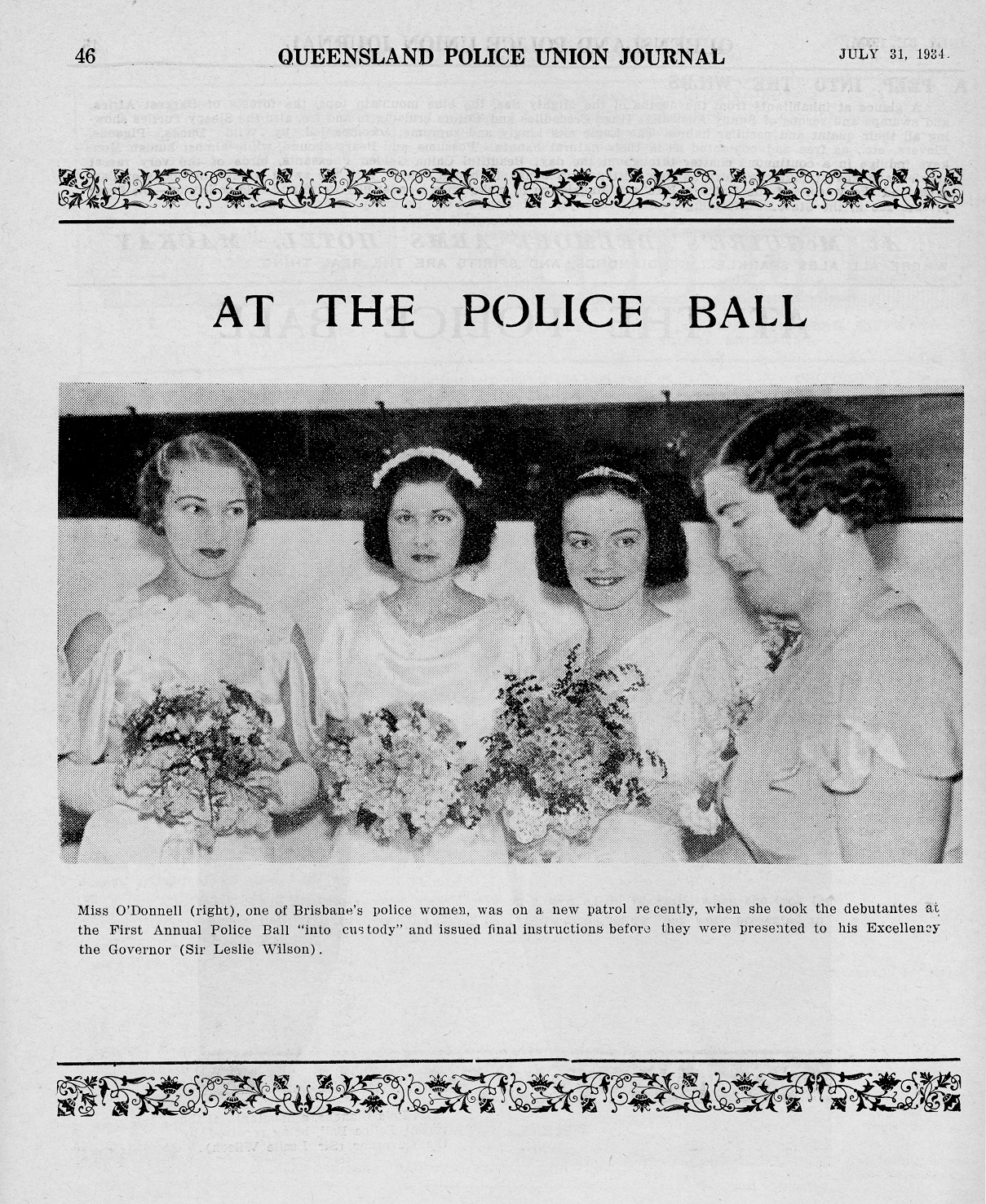
Policewoman Eileen O'Donnell (left) with three debutantes at the first Queensland Police Ball, 1 August 1934

The first two women police, Miss Zara Dare and Miss Eileen O'Donnell were appointed on 16 March, after Queensland Cabinet supported a submission by Irene Longman, Queensland's first female Member of the Queensland Legislative Assembly. There were 60 applicants for the roles. They were attached to Roma Street police station in the centre of Brisbane but were not sworn-in and had no powers of arrest. They did not have a uniform but were given a badge. Their duties were to protect the interests of women and children.

=== 1932 ===
On 5 January, four-year-old Betty Doherty was taken by 4-metre (13 ft) crocodile as she plays near the Seymour River, about 12 kilometres (7.5 mi) east of Halifax. Acting Sergeant Frank Conaty and Constables George Schnitzerling, Jens Fredericksen and Arnold Still made an extensive search but fail to find any trace of the child.

=== 1934 ===
Cecil James Carroll becomes the seventh Police Commissioner on 8 May 1934.

A special squad of traffic police was organised for the control of the Brisbane traffic district.

The Battley Single Finger Print System was adopted, to reduce the period of search for a print found at the crime scene among the 470,000 impressions held.

Carroll introduces the police cadet system to admit applicants of 18 years with a junior pass or a senior level school certificate.

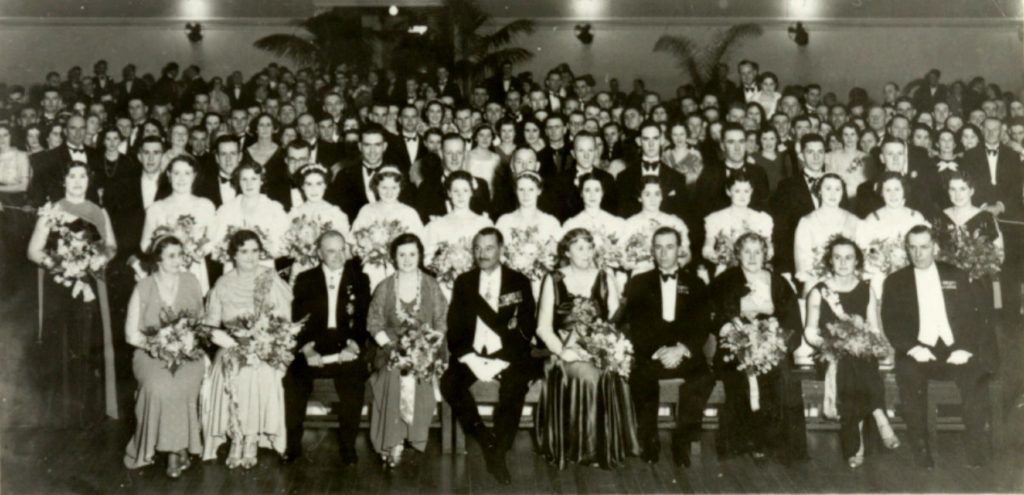
Group photo, inaugural Police Ball, Brisbane City Hall, 1 August 1934

Carroll initiated the establishment of the Queensland Police Welfare Club which was located within Roma Street police station and served alcohol as well as offering recreational amenities such as a library, billiard tables and darts boards. Six weeks after its establishment the Club held its first ball at the Brisbane City Hall on 1 August 1934. Over 2,000 people attended and was believed to be the largest function of its kind ever held in Brisbane. The balls were an annual event and were held at Brisbane City Hall until the 1960s when they relocated to Cloudland Ballroom; the balls ceased in the 1970s.

=== 1935 ===
The Modus Operandi Section was established by Police Commissioner Carroll as a central repository for criminal records regarding their habits or manner of working. A Criminal Photographic Supplement was reproduced in the Queensland Police Gazette to allow quick access to the information collected by the Modus Operandi Section.

The Queensland Police Department was given control of the Firearms Act and creates the Firearms Section under Clerk Thomas Baty, to undertake the major task of licensing firearms.

Commissioner Carroll gains approval for an experimental wireless station with the call sign 'VKR'. Three patrol cars were equipped with the new one-way, wireless communication system.

Weekly lectures were delivered by experienced officers at the Roma Street police barracks and copies of lectures were distributed to every police officer.

=== 1936 ===
Newly-sworn Constable Thomas Baty assumes charge of the Firearm Section.

The new brick two-storey, Fortitude Valley police station was built and officially opened on 6 July. It was described as the "finest, most up-to-date and most comfortable police station in Queensland". It is now heritage-listed.

=== 1937 ===
The Queensland Police becomes mechanised and a departmental garage was built to service the departments growing number of motorcycles and motor vehicles. Trained mechanics worked in the garage.

The Firearms Section was enlarged to include forensic ballistics and a laboratory was installed, with microscopical and photomicrographical apparatus to examine bullets. Thomas Baty, who was originally employed as a police service clerk at the expanded Firearms Section, was sworn into the police force as its firearms specialist.

=== 1938 ===
A librarian was appointed to look after the Central Police Library's collection of 5,000 law, crime and fiction books.

The Criminal Investigation Branch consisted of 48 detectives, 65 plain clothes police spread over all districts, along with 14 cadets.

The Firearm Section was expanded to encompass the scientific investigation of firearms under the area of Forensic Ballistics.

On 28 November Constable George Robert Young of the water police was one of four men on a RAAF amphibious aircraft which crashed killing all on board. They were searching for the body of missing woman Marjorie Norval in the estuaries of Moreton Bay when the aircraft hit high tension wires.

=== 1939 ===
During World War II (1939 to 1945) the Police Commissioner worked in cooperation with the Australian Defence Department to provide protection of civilian lives, public buildings and communications lines.

The King's Commendation for Brave Conduct was instituted by King George VI to acknowledge brave acts by civilians and members of the military in non-warlike circumstances during a time of war or in peacetime where the action would not otherwise be recognised by an existing award.

Legislation provides police with selection of and control over civilian air-raid wardens. Police officers were involved in enrolling and training wardens to receive and pass on news of raids from Defence Information Centres.

A seven-month-long "School of Instruction in Criminal Investigation Work" course was established.

New barracks at Petrie Terrace were built to replace the old structure used since 1883 at a cost of £40,000. It provided a training centre for recruits and a home for 104 single men performing duty in central Brisbane.

== 1940s ==
=== 1940 ===
The system of interchange of detectives and the sharing of knowledge with New South Wales and Victoria police continues, with one Queensland detective working in Sydney and the other in Melbourne.

The King's Police Medal becomes the King's Police and Fire Services Medal and was awarded for acts of exceptional courage and skill or who exhibit conspicuous devotion to duty. First awarded to Constable Athol Haines on 28 July 1943.

The George Medal was established by order of King George VI on 4 September, was given for acts of great bravery. First awarded to Constable 1/c Osmond Cislowski on 11 May 1956.

The number of women in the Women Police Section increases to nine in response to the extra demands on policing during World War II.

Thomas Baty pointed out the advantages of scientific methods in investigative police work in the examination of bullets, documents, clothing, and stains. He was placed in charged of the newly organised Scientific (Technical) Section which undertook forensic laboratory work.

=== 1941 ===
A permanent two-way radio station, allowing two-way radio wireless communication with patrol cars, was established to replace the temporary one-way system in use since 1935.

The Women Police Section was formed with Elizabeth Boyle as supervisor and attached to the Criminal Investigation Branch Headquarters in George Street, Brisbane.

The Central Fingerprint Bureau in Sydney was created for use by all policing jurisdictions.

The Forensic Ballistics Section was renamed as the Scientific Section and now encompasses forensic chemistry, scientific photography and the examination of documents and handwriting. The Scientific Section was examining documents and handwriting with ultra-violet rays and microscopy.

The Force was staffed by 1610 police officers and 34 native trackers at 341 stations.

=== 1942 ===
Inspector Noel Carseldine remarked: "The fact of the war having continued throughout the year has meant the performance of arduous duties by the police in this district. Several hundred aliens have been interned in the sugar areas of Ayr, Brandon, Giru, Halifax, Home Hill and Ingham".

=== 1945 ===
246 bicycles were in use across the State.

The Fingerprint Bureau, the Modus Operandi Record System, the Photographic and Scientific Sections were classified under the title: Technical Aids in the Investigation of Crime.

=== 1946 ===
Detective Constable Les Bardwell took over the Scientific Section and remains as the Officer in Charge until his retirement in 1976.

The "White Ghost", a white Chevrolet Special Deluxe utility, equipped with a loud hailer, was introduced to Brisbane and Toowoomba streets as part of a road safety campaign.

New uniform consisted of an open-neck tunic, airman's blue shirt, with detachable collar, black tie, and a new type white helmet.

=== 1947 ===
The Photographic Unit gains staff who have experience with drawing plans of crime scenes and road collisions.

Probationaries undergo six months of training at the Police Depot.

=== 1948 ===
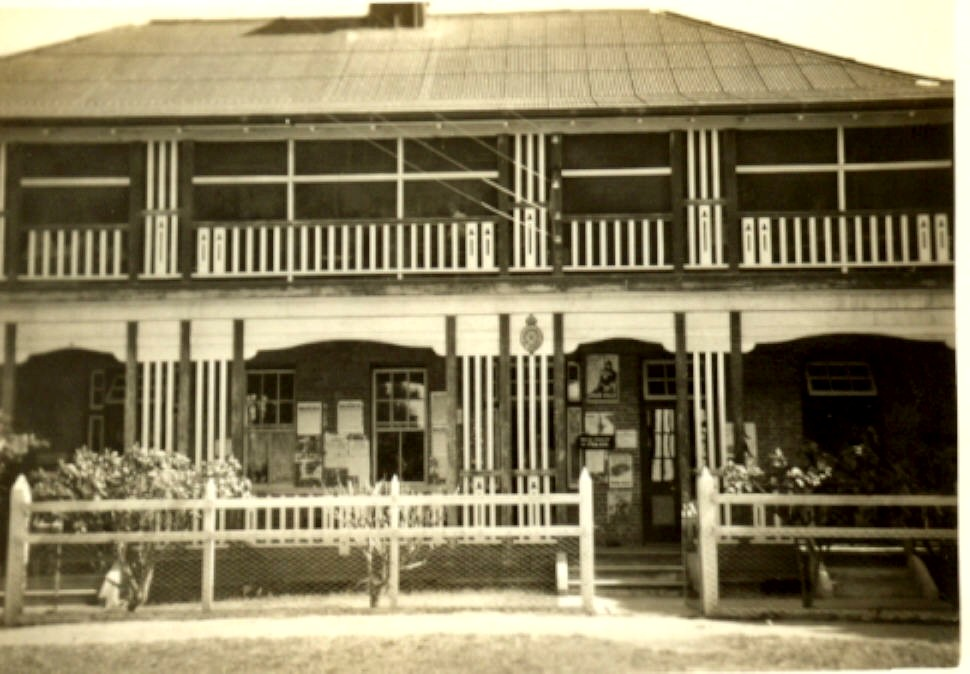
Cairns Police Station, 1948. Note the station badge above and to the left of the entry.

The Queensland Police-Citizens Youth Welfare Association was registered under the jurisdiction of the Police Department on 20 May.

=== 1949 ===
There were 100 cars in use across the state representing brands such as Ford, Buick, Chevrolet, International, G.M.C, Mercury, Hudson, De Soto, Dodge and Plymouth.

Fingerprint Expert Cecil Smith and two Queensland detectives make history when they take hand and palm prints from almost the entire population of Ocean Island (now Banaba Island) to catch a double murderer.

John Smith becomes the eight Police Commissioner on 24 July 1949.

== 1950s ==
=== 1950 ===
Radio transmissions were made from Mount Coot-tha and the switch from amplitude modulated (AM) mobile equipment to frequency modulated (FM) equipment was made.

Road safety lectures were introduced into schools and kindergartens. Puppets were used to illustrate scenarios for younger children and older children were taught to cross the street and to ride a bicycle safely.

After an inquisitive cow fell into a ditch at the rear of the Queensland Woollen Mill in Ipswich, police were called to perform a rescue operation. Using a small crane, the heavy beast was successfully winched from the ditch and suffered only shock.

There were fourteen police districts and 338 stations throughout Queensland at 30 June. Somerset police station was re-established and a new station was opened at Kenilworth.

The Police Force was staffed by 2030 male police officers, 10 women police and 30 trackers. The State population had reached one million.

=== 1951 ===
The Central Communications Room opens at the CIB building in Brisbane and becomes the nerve centre of police communications through the state.

=== 1954 ===
Police radio stations were operating in Brisbane, Rockhampton and Townsville.

The British Empire Medal for Meritorious Service originally established in 1922, was first awarded to Constable Noel Haupt on 17 October.

The King's Police and Fire Services Medal was split into two awards, the Queen's Fire Service Medal and the Queen's Police Medal for Gallantry which was first awarded posthumously to Constable 1/c Roy Doyle on 1 April 1956.

The King's Commendation for Brave Conduct became the Queen's Commendation for Brave Conduct. It was first awarded to Constable Clifford Lebsanft on 11 May 1956.

=== 1955 ===
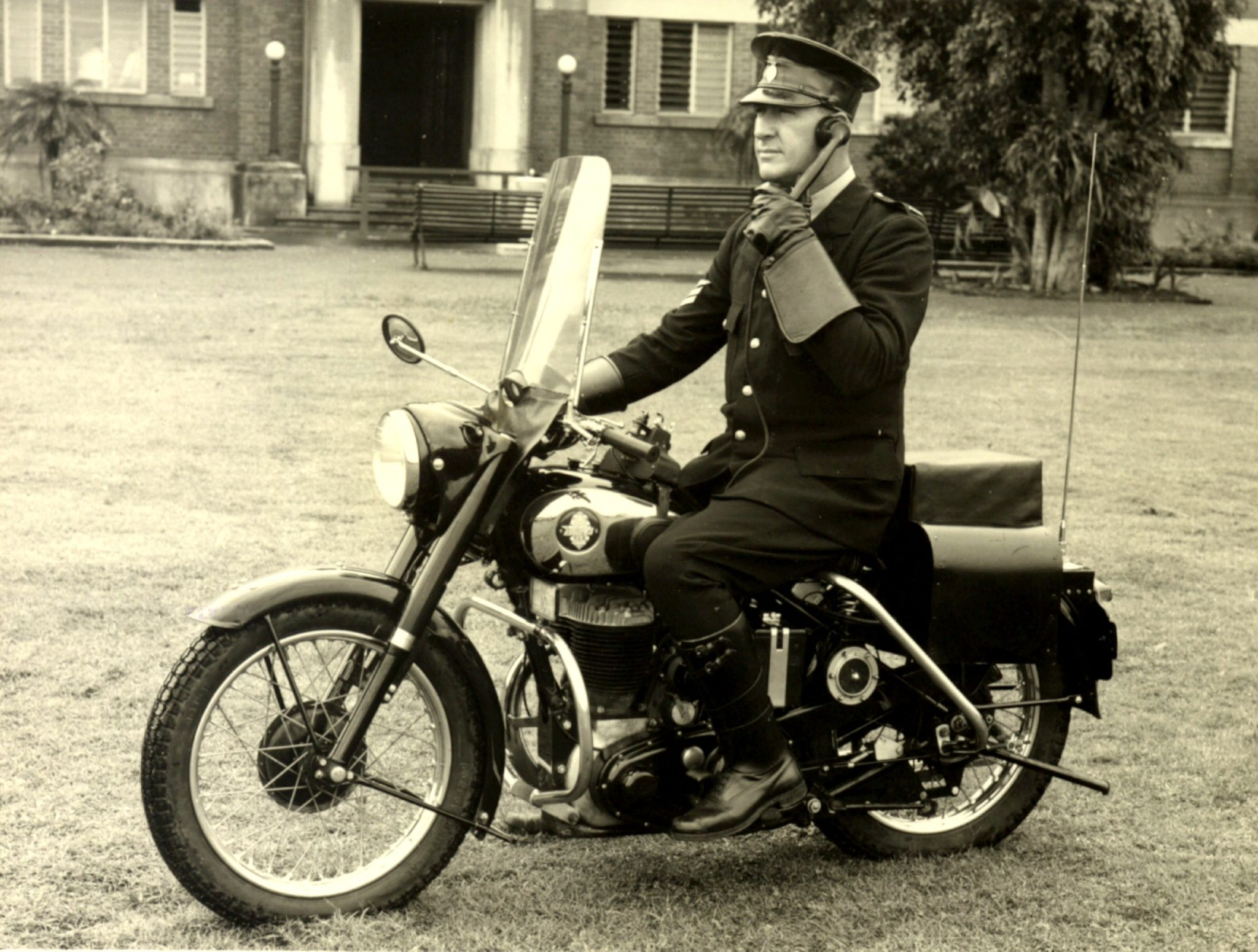
Sergeant Cecil Trower on his two-way radio equipped BSA motorcycle, circa 1956

Women were permitted to join the Queensland Police Union.

The Brisbane Traffic Branch was established as an entity separate from the Brisbane Police District.

Patrick Glynn becomes the ninth Police Commissioner on 6 January 1955.

=== 1956 ===
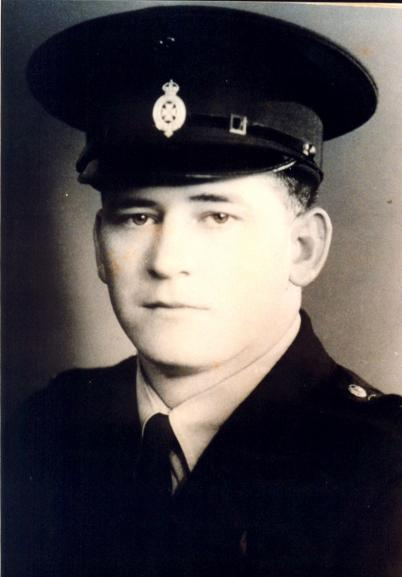
Constance Roy Doyle, 1956

The Union's application for equal pay fails in the Industrial Court.

The State was affected by cyclonic disturbances and flood conditions resulting in widespread interruption to communications and damage to property.

On 1 April Constable First Class Roy Doyle died in hospital at Mackay from head injuries sustained when he hit a submerged block of concrete while attempting a rescue in the flooded Pioneer River at Mackay on 29 March.

On 1 May the awarding of the Police Long Service and Good Conduct Medal, originally proclaimed by King George VI in 1951, was extended to include the states of Australia by Queen Elizabeth II. The medal was awarded after twenty-two years of approved police service and 378 police officers qualify.

=== 1957 ===
208 centres were sharing 384 vehicles and 126 horses – 73 cars, 113 utilities, 37 land rovers, 6 vans, 155 motorbikes and 179 bicycles.

Thomas William Harold becomes the tenth Police Commissioner on 1 April 1957.

Two Traffic Branch officers attend the "Traffic Engineering Course" offered by the New South Wales University of Technology.

Police Commissioner Harold puts into operation four radio-equipped prowl cars to cruise the city and suburbs through the night.

=== 1958 ===
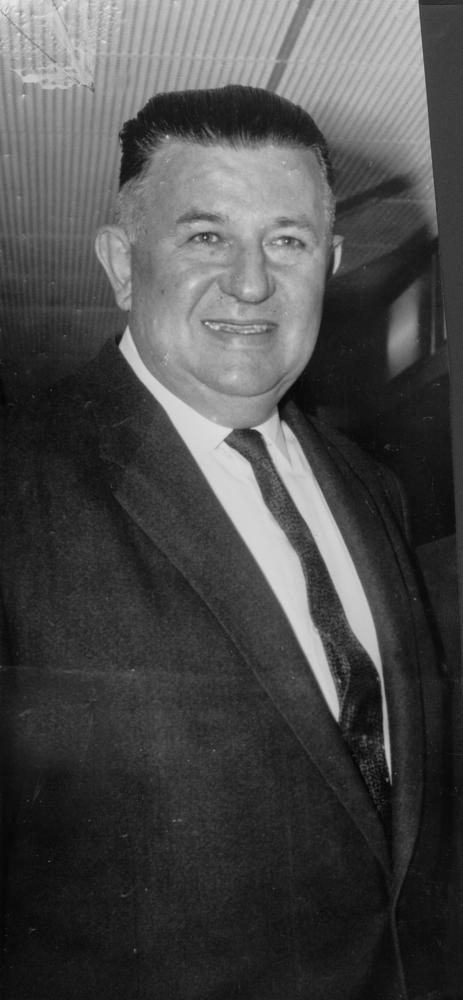
Frank Bischof, 1962

The British Empire Medal for Gallantry was established on 14 January. First awarded to Constable James Boyle on 7 August 1959.

Francis Erich (Frank) Bischof becomes the eleventh Police Commissioner on 30 January 1958. With a view to raising the morale and status of newly sworn-in personnel, Bischof decides to inaugurate passing out parades for probationaries. The first parade was held on 29 May with twenty-four men being sworn.

The Queensland Police Pipe Band makes its first public appearance on 29 August at a passing-out parade at the Petrie Terrace Police Depot.

=== 1959 ===
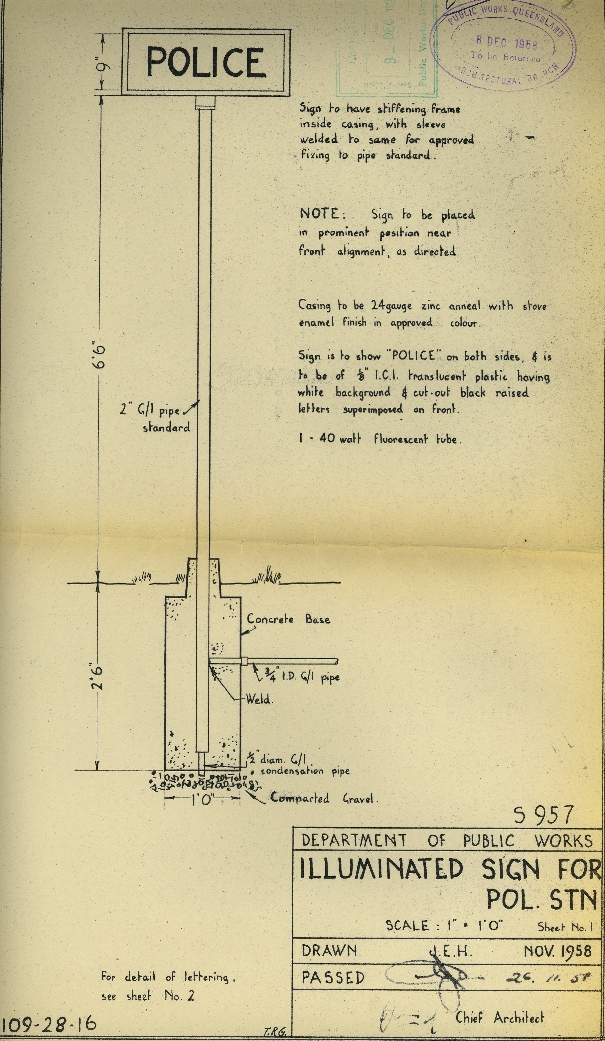
Original plan drawing for the first illuminated POLICE sign, dated 26 November 1958

The Stock Investigation Squad was formed, with a detective sergeant and three plain clothes members.

Following complaints that police stations were not readily identifiable, the Queensland Department of Works was asked to supply conspicuous illuminated signs showing POLICE in black letters on a white background. On 5 May 1959, a sample illuminated sign was erected at Holland Park Police Station and with that success, an order was placed with Albert Smith and Son to manufacture these signs. Over the next decade the illuminated signs were progressively installed at stations and the old style cast iron badges were returned to the Police Depot. Sometime in the late 1960s the illuminated word POLICE, was produced in white letters on a black background, and in the mid 1980s a blue light was added to the top for more effect.

Sub-Inspector Cecil Smith was appointed as the first Queensland Police Public Relations Officer on 6 July. He was expected to make regular telecasts on topical police matters by way of the new technology of television.

== 1960s ==
=== 1960 ===
Detective Senior Sergeant Les Bardwell, Constable Barry Short and Cadet Neil Raward were the only three scientific officers servicing the State.

A new range of drab olive uniform and a new cap badge were introduced.

=== 1961 ===
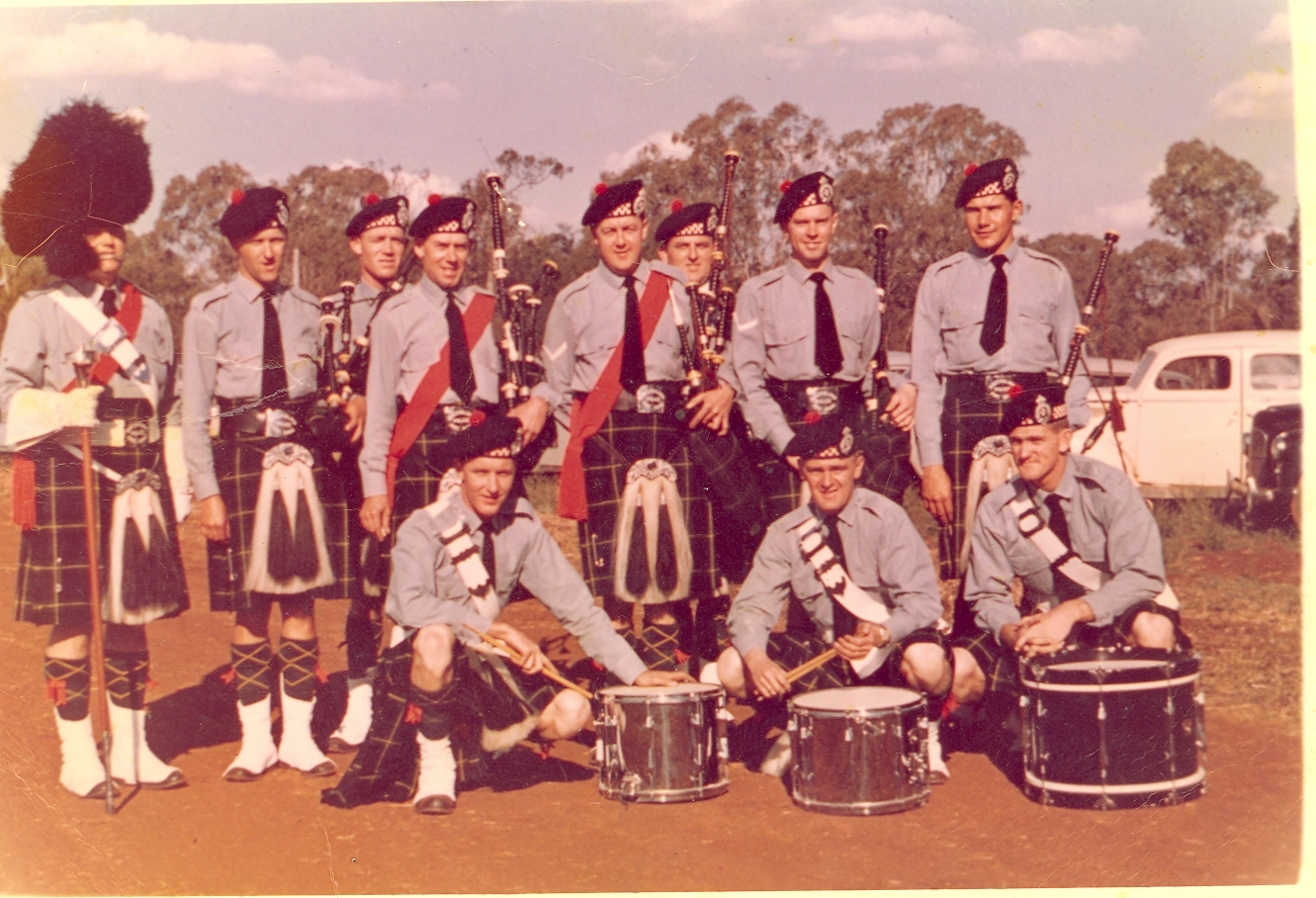
Queensland Police Pipe Band at Wooroolin near Kingaroy 1961

A new insignia was introduced which was an adaptation of the police badge. It bears the Latin motto Constantia ac Comitate (English translation: Firmness with Courtesy).

=== 1962 ===
The old Queensland Egg Board building, on the corner of Makerston Street and North Quay was purchased and converted into the State police headquarters.

.38 Smith & Wesson revolvers were purchased to enable the standardisation of firearms.

On 19 February Constable Gregory Olive was shot in the chest at close range and killed when he knocked on a front door to make inquiries at Kelvin Grove, Brisbane.

On 16 August Constable Douglas Wrembeck stopped to question a motorist in South Brisbane and was killed when he was struck by a car driven by a hit-and-run driver.

=== 1963 ===
The Juvenile Aid Bureau (JAB) was established to guide potential youthful law breakers on the right path and prevent them from incurring a court conviction. JABs were renamed in the 2000s as child protection and investigation units (CPIUs).

On 14 February Senior Constable Cecil Bagley was electrocuted when he tried to rescue a neighbour being electrocuted in his car at Mount Gravatt, south Brisbane. Although at home, his death was deemed to have occurred while on duty because, as a police officer, he was always expected to respond in an emergency situation.

=== 1964 ===
On 30 June the police strength equals 2760 police officers (1 police officer to 571 people).

On 26 October Senior Constable Desmond Trannore was shot and killed attending a domestic disturbance near Gordonvale, North Queensland.

=== 1965 ===
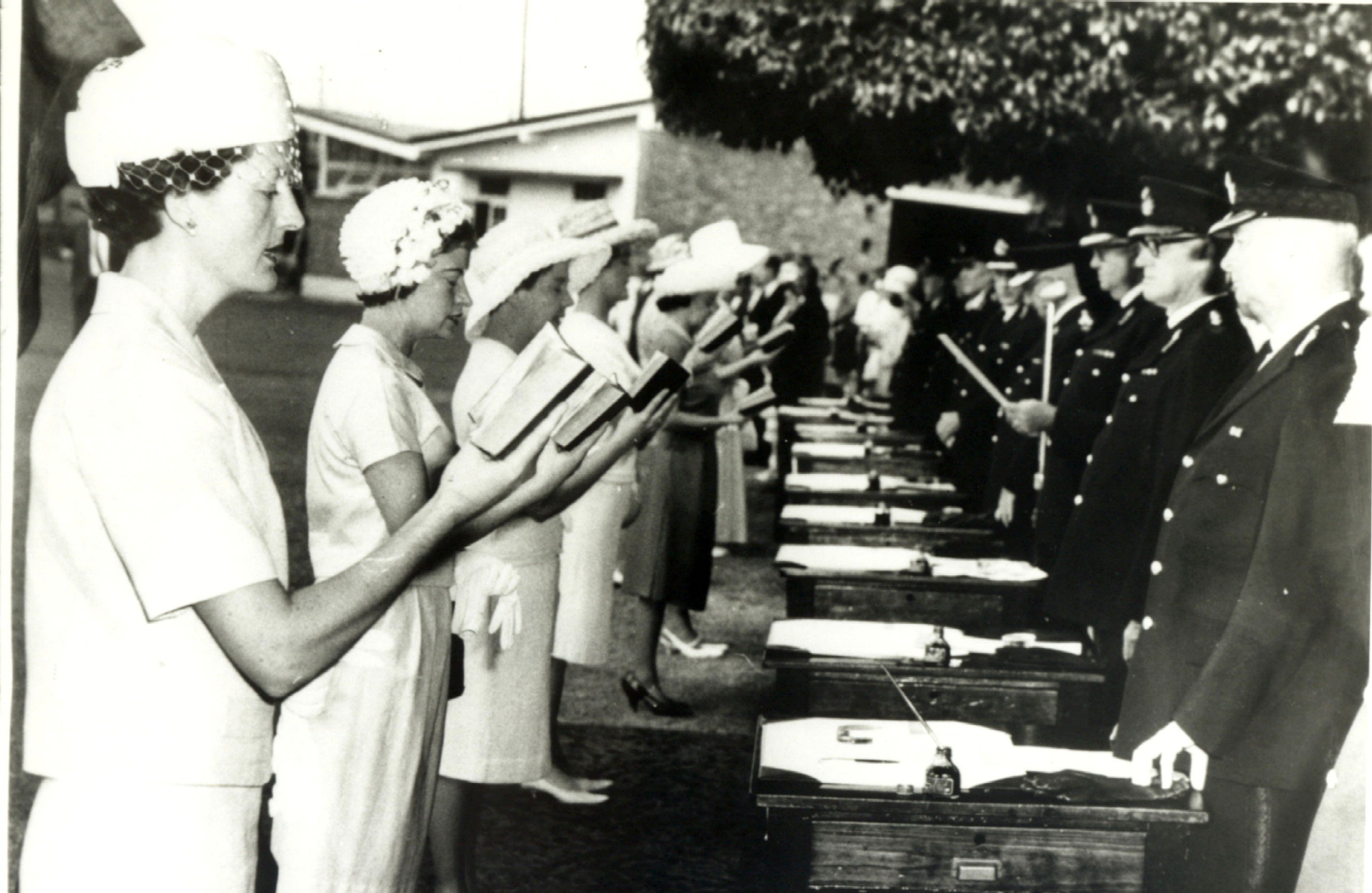
Eight serving female police took the Oath of Office and became fully sworn Police Officers, 31 March 1965. Front to Rear: Elizabeth Boyle; Laura Frisch; Ailsa Warnick; Pat Ryan; Clare Conaty; Yvonne Weier; Judith Barrett; Olwen Doolan

On 31 March, eight serving plain-clothes women police were sworn in and given equal powers and rank as male officers. In June the first uniformed women were sworn in following regular probationary training.

Twenty-one new Ford Cortina sedan motor cars were purchased for traffic work.

179 cars, eight vans, eighteen motor cycles, one bus and one utility truck were fitted with two-way wireless. Twenty-three cars and three utility trucks were fitted with two-way wireless.

The first set of specially chosen police was trained for a "Rescue 8" Squad to handle major incidents and disaster emergencies.

The first-ever issue of attire for policewomen was a female version of the drab olive uniform.

=== 1966 ===
Sergeant 2/c Colin Ward and Constable Colin Tapsall installed the first police-owned UHF radio linking system from Saddle Mountain near Kuranda, to the Cairns Airport.

=== 1968 ===
All new CIB detective appointees were required to attend a course of training that includes lectures by senior experienced detectives, films and practical application.

The Company Squad was reorganised as the Fraud Squad.

On 27 March Constable Douglas Gordon was shot and killed attending a domestic disturbance at Inala, in south Brisbane.

On 26 June the Crime Prevention Bureau commences operation, for the purpose of providing two police officers in a full-time capacity to impart security and personal safety advice to community members.

The Emergency Squad was established principally to deal with the apprehension of armed offenders.

A World War II sea mine washes up onto the beach at Surfers Paradise, shocking those enjoying the sun, sand and surf. The device was successfully deactivated and removed by the Royal Australian Navy with the help of Gold Coast police.

=== 1969 ===
Printing of Volume 1 of the new "Queensland Policeman's Manual" was completed and preparation of Volume 2 was well advanced.

Probationaries receive training in the use of Breath Testing Devices (Alcotest) and Breath Analysing Instruments (Breathalyser).

Norwin William Bauer becomes the twelfth Police Commissioner on 14 February.

On 9 April Senior Constable Colin Brown was shot and killed while investigating the behaviour of a farm employee on a property near Dayboro, north of Brisbane.

== 1970s ==
=== 1970 ===
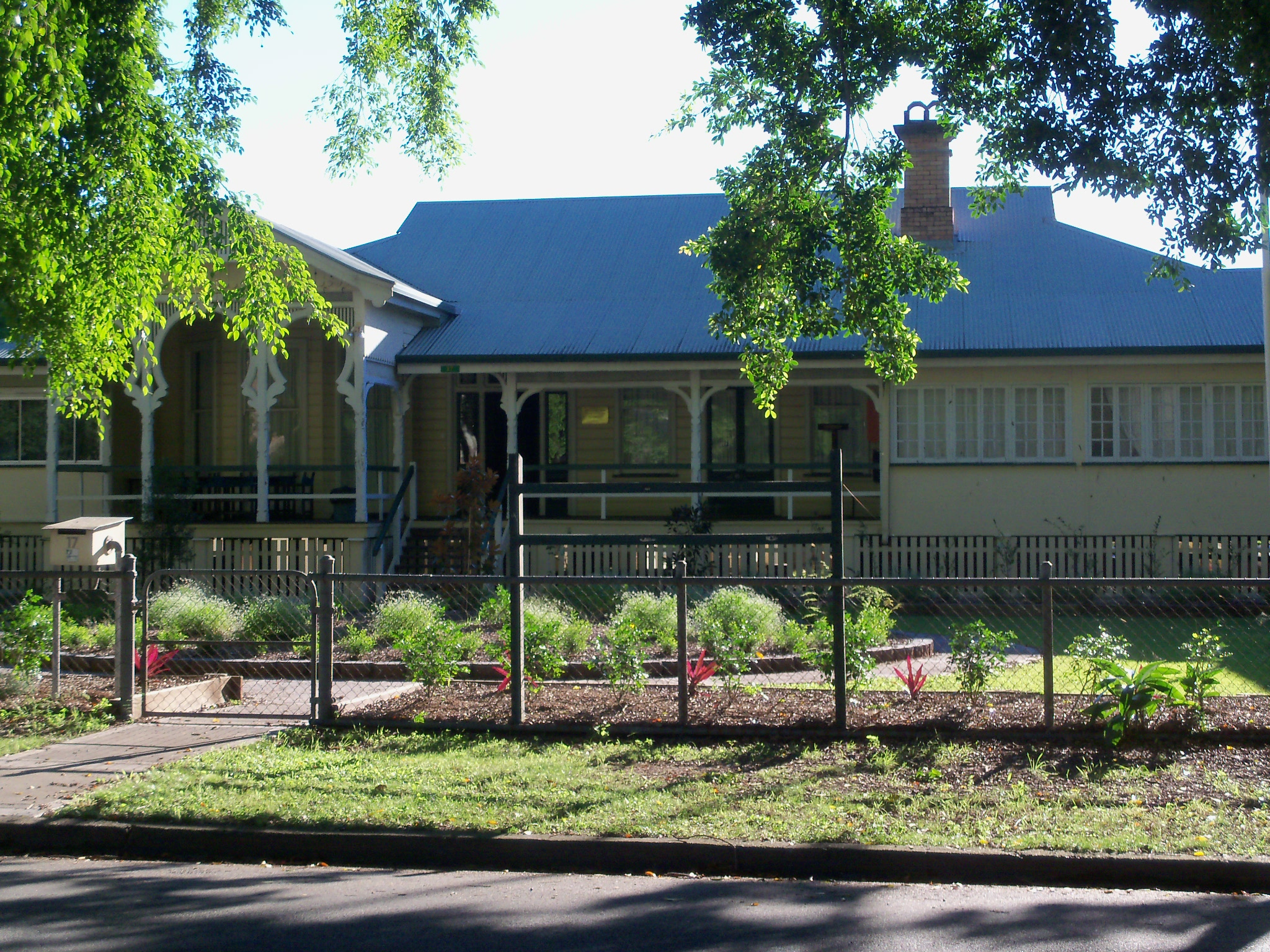
Queensland Police College, 2011

The number of policewomen equals twenty-seven. Postings extend outside central Brisbane and to provincial centres. The Queensland Police Union achieves equal pay for women with the support of Police Commissioner Ray Whitrod.

The position of Assistant Commissioner (Crime) was established.

The Queensland Police College at Chelmer commences operation on 27 January as an "in-service training centre".

All newly-sworn constables were sent, over a period of twelve months, to different metropolitan police stations for on-the-job training.

Raymond Wells Whitrod becomes the thirteenth Police Commissioner on 1 September 1970.

=== 1971 ===
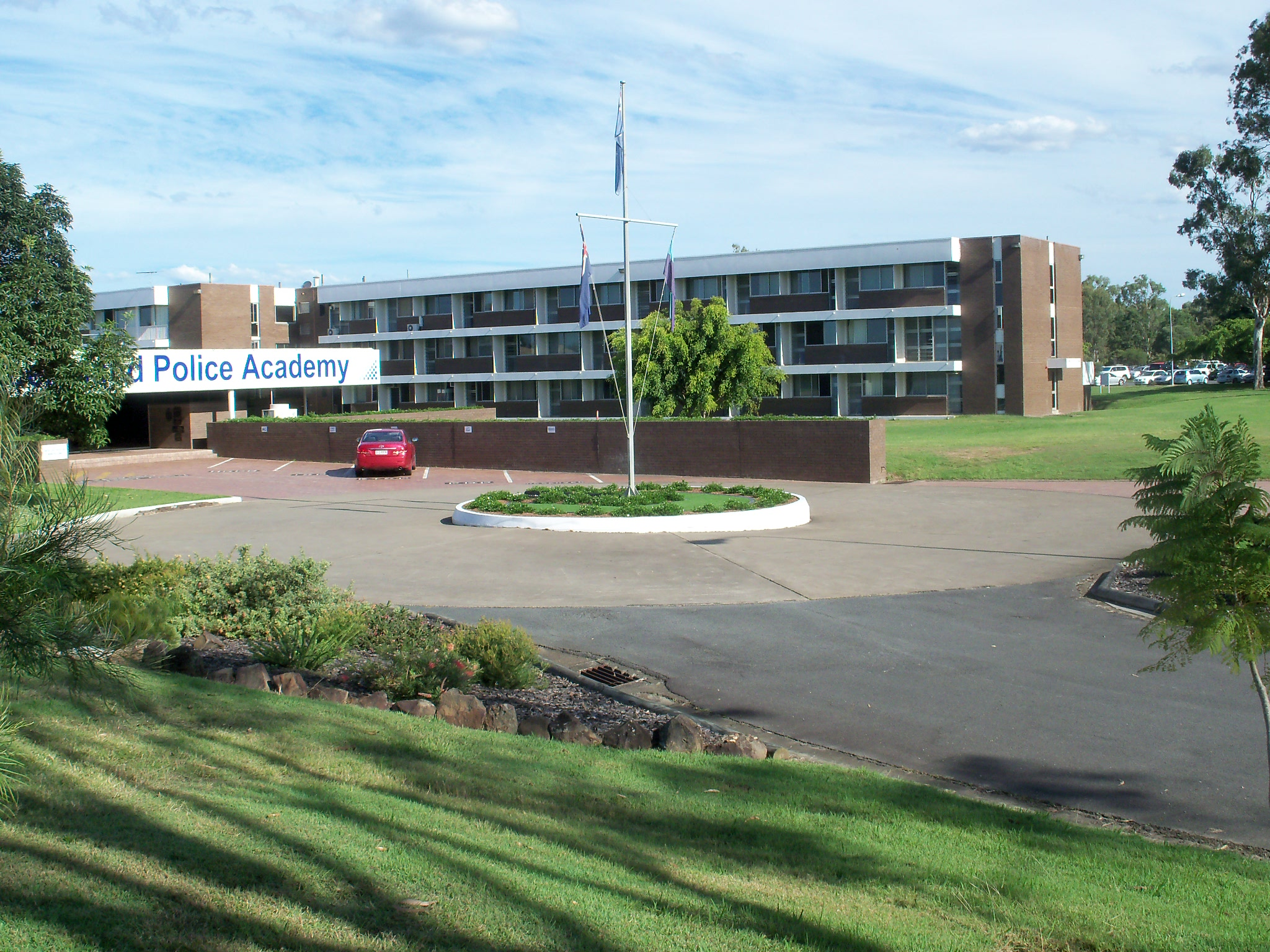
QPS Academy (Oxley campus), 2011

Police and protestors clash over the South African Springbok football team's tour of Queensland.

The minimum height for women joining was set at 162.5 centimetres (5 ft 4.0 in) and the bar on married women serving or joining up was removed.

Consideration was given to the use of computers for police purposes.

The Public Order Squad was formed with approximately 100 members, who provide staff for duty in connection with street demonstrations and similar disturbances.

A new cadet training scheme was introduced. The three-year structure, combines senior examination subjects and special police courses.

The Police Driver Training Wing was established and courses commenced on 1 March.

Stage 1 of the Queensland Police Academy at Oxley opens in January and the first 150 cadets were admitted.

Uniform colour changes from drab olive back to blue. Policewomen wear a black skirt, white shirt with black tie and bowler style cap.

In December 1971 the Police Act Amendment Act 1971 (Qld) allowed an unmarried female officer to continue as a police officer if she got married, and allowed married women to join.

=== 1972 ===
The Queensland Police Academy officially opens at Oxley on 24 March.

In August 1972, the Queensland Police Force formed a corps of permanent police prosecutors. This came about because of the need to improve the conviction rate in a magistrate's court.

=== 1973 ===
A crime intelligence course for detectives commences at the Queensland Police College.

=== 1974 ===
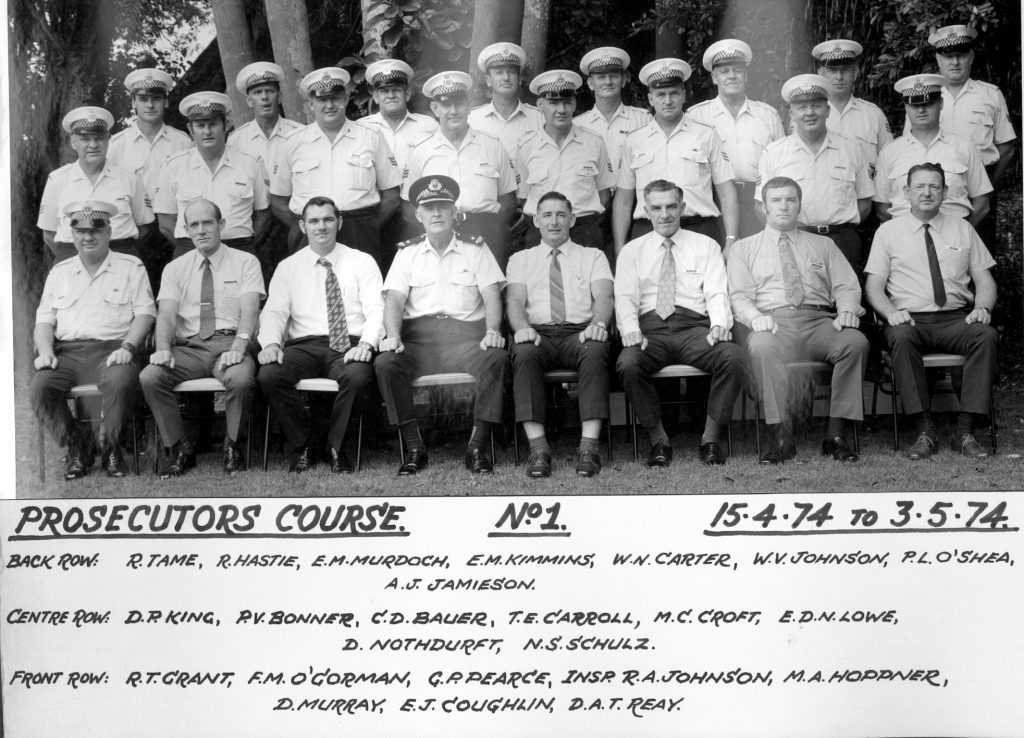
First group of police to do the Queensland Police Prosecutors Course, 1974

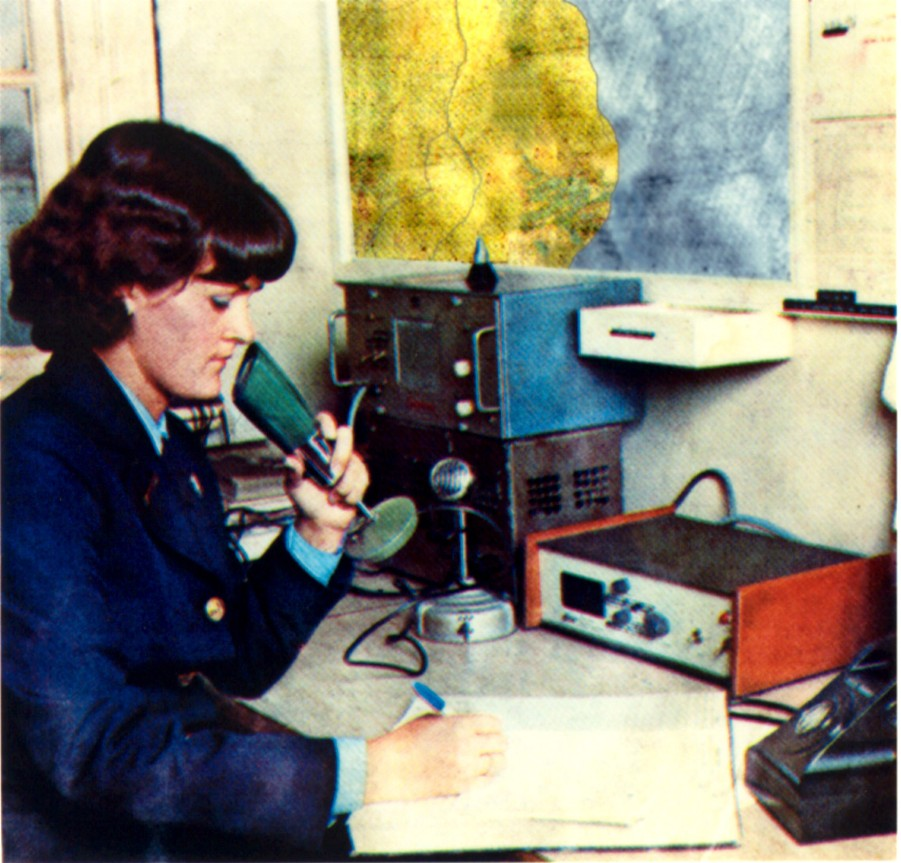
Constable Patricia Garnaut at the old Water Police Station, Petrie Bight, circa 1974

A Scenes of Crime Training Unit was opened at the Queensland Police Academy and a Scenes of Crime Unit becomes operational.

First female detective was appointed.

On 15 April 1974, the first official Prosecutor's course commenced at the Police College at Chelmer.

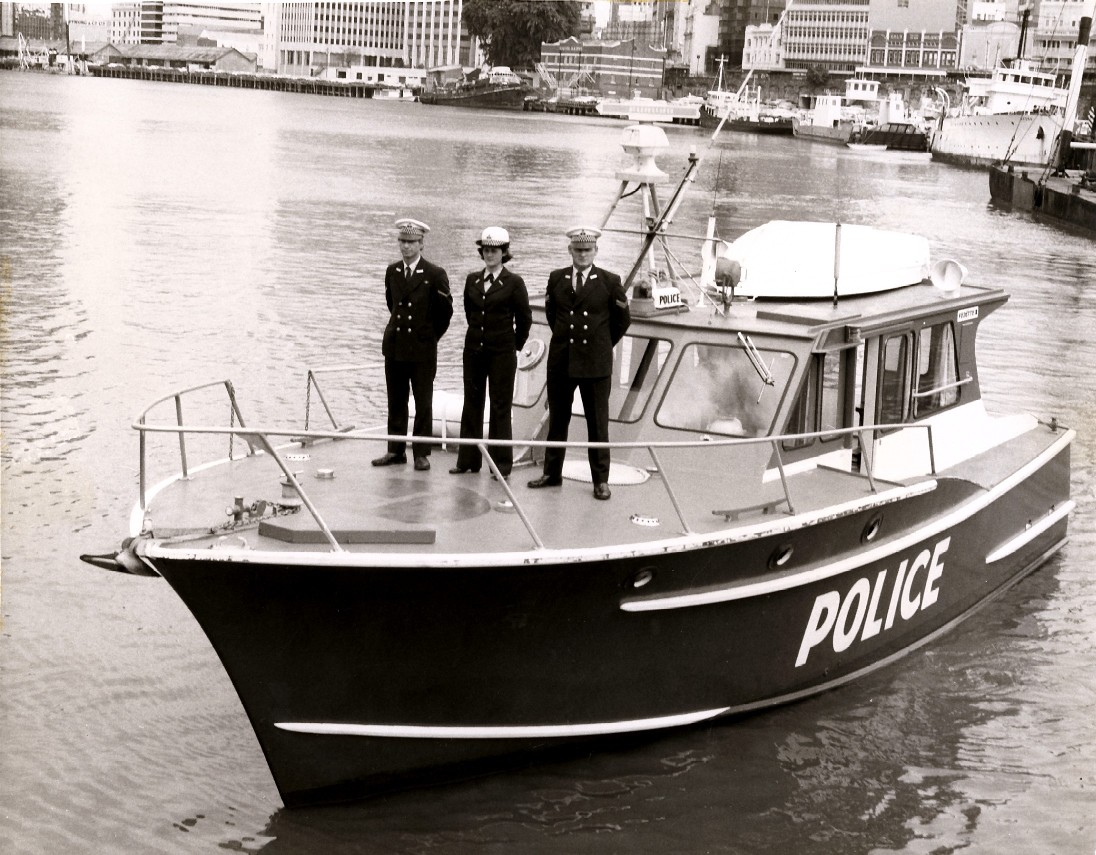
Constable Patricia Garnaut stands between colleagues Senior Constables Richard Bartley (left) and Eric Webster, on the deck of Vedette III, circa 1974

On 25 November 1974 Constable Patricia Anne Garnaut was the first woman to join the Queensland Water Police. Earlier in January that year during the 1974 Brisbane floods she had been stationed at Torwood Police Station and had worked with the water police rescuing people from their flooded homes.

Two days after Cyclone Tracy devastates Darwin in the Northern Territory on 24–26 December, twelve Queensland police officers arrive to lend a hand.

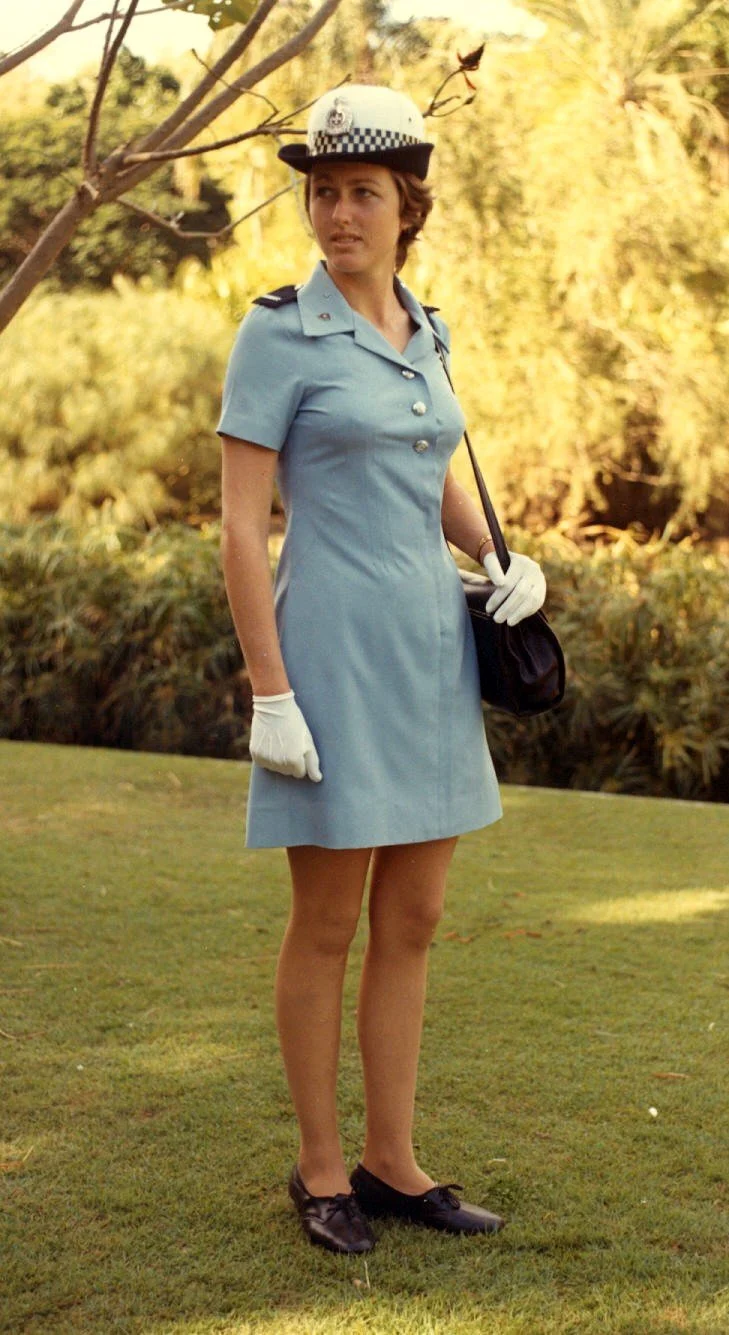
Tonya Carew in police summer uniform, 1975

=== 1975 ===
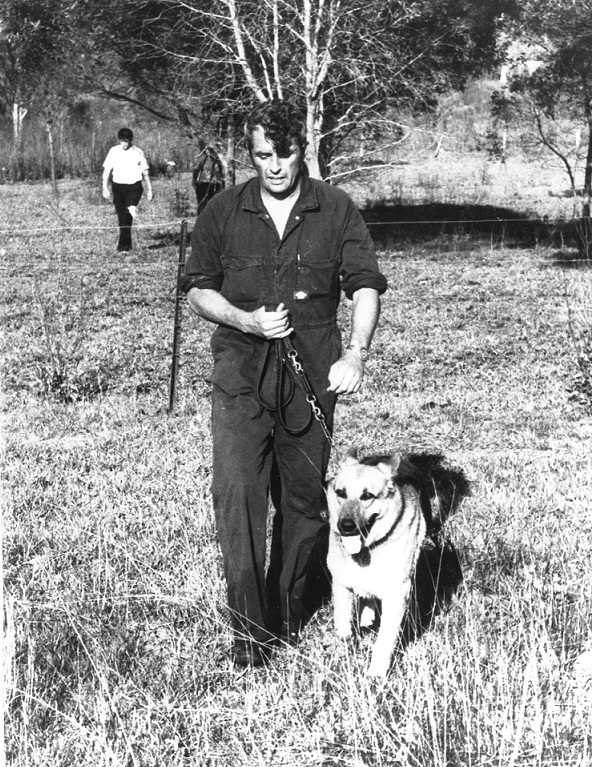
Dog Squad Constable First Class Terry Hawkins and Rex on a job, circa 1975

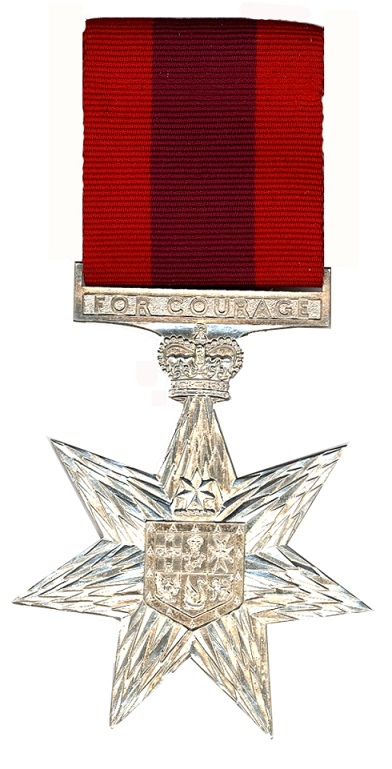
Star of Courage

The Police Air Wing was established with the purchase of two Cessna 180E aircraft. Four police officers and qualified pilots were attached to the Wing.

The Rape Squad, comprising seven female constables, commences working from within the Information Bureau.

The quota system for the recruitment of women was removed and integration was adopted in deployment. Police Commissioner Whitrod's open door policy results in an influx of women.

Final year cadets and probationaries receive twenty-three training periods in crowd control, prisoner control and crisis-situation handling.

The Star of Courage, the second highest Australian bravery decoration, was established in the Australian honours system in February. It is awarded for acts of conspicuous courage in circumstances of great peril. Only four have been awarded to Queensland police officers, the first to Constable Rodney Edward on 16 March 1988.

A new system of identification numbers and rank boards with metal chevrons were introduced for all ranks.

On 2 November Senior Constable Lyle Hoey died after being deliberately run down by a car near Mount Molloy in North Queensland.

=== 1976 ===
The number of Queensland policewomen equals 308.

All police centres across the State have access to a motor vehicle.

The Electronic Data Processing Unit was reorganised into the Planning and Research Branch and begins developing computer programs to make information available on criminal statistics, stolen vehicles, staff deployment, and vehicles of interest.

Forbes House in Makerston Street was purchased and converted into Police Headquarters and officially opens 7 March.

Terence Murray 'Terry' Lewis becomes the fourteenth Police Commissioner on 29 November 1976.

=== 1977 ===
Three new police vessels were commissioned: D.G. Gordon, G.J. Olive and Lyle M. Hoey; named after three police officers who were killed in the line of duty.

The first step was taken in the automation of the colour printing process for the Photographic Section.

Experienced journalist Ian Hatcher was appointed as the first Police Press Officer on 29 August. His responsibilities were to liaise with media and to publicise the work and improve the public image of the Force throughout the State.

In January, police pilot Sergeant 2/c Ron Rooke successfully carries out flood relief operations in the Camooweal, Burketown, Hamilton, Boulia and Doomadgee areas by dropping several hundred kilograms of food to stranded motorists.

=== 1978 ===
The recruitment of female cadets was stopped but the quota for the recruitment of female adult probationers was revived.

A computer systems training officer was appointed to train police officers in the correct use and operation of computer equipment for practical police work.

=== 1979 ===
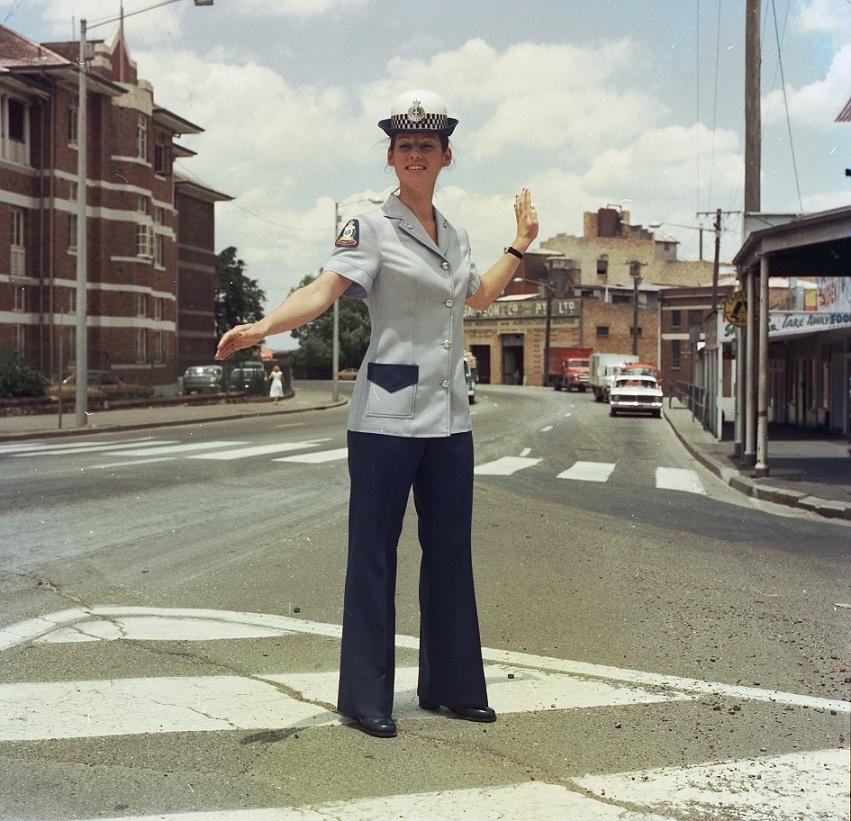
Constable Diana Hotchkis models the new female summer uniform consisting of a light blue safari jacket with dark blue pockets and bell bottom slacks, 1979. Note her matching blue eyeshadow

To give the public and the police an appreciation of the history of the Police Force, the Police Museum was fully open to the public on 17 May.

On 12 March the Bomb Squad was reorganised as a two-person Arson-Bomb Squad and its activities were expanded.

An armed man hijacked a commercial aircraft between Coolangatta and Brisbane and holds air crew and passengers hostage at Eagle Farm Airport. Emergency Squad personnel were deployed while a police negotiator secures the release of the hostages.

Epaulette boards give way to shoulder patches and stripes of rank on the sleeves of new uniform. The Latin motto adopted on the shoulder patches was Constantia ac Comitate.

== 1980s ==
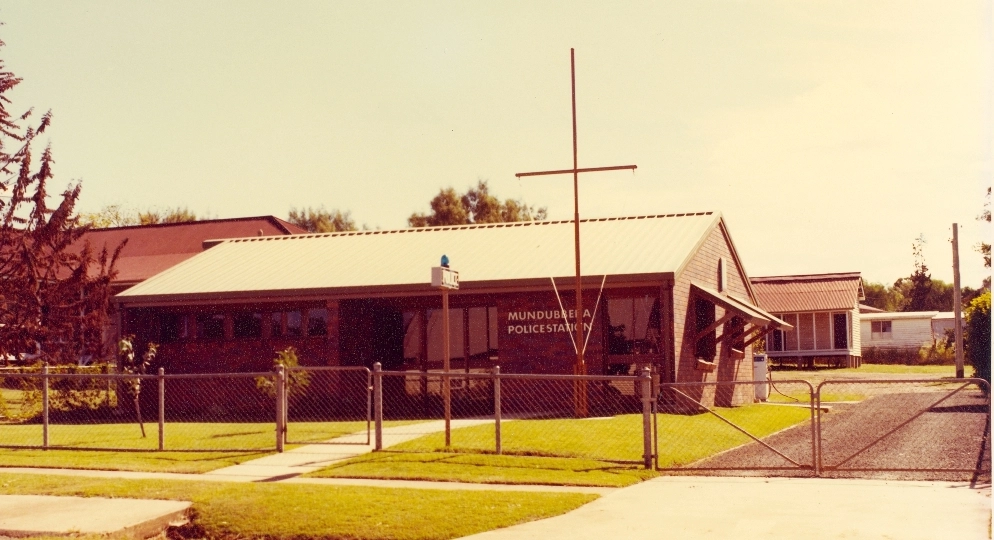
Mundubbera Police Station, circa 1985. Note the illuminated sign with blue light.

=== 1980 ===
A new computerised message-switching system was introduced, with terminals installed in the metropolitan area and some district headquarters.

Traffic branch motorcyclists were issued with blue leather caps which were worn instead of helmets while off their bikes and directing traffic.

=== 1981 ===
The Rescue Squad was created within the Task Force in Brisbane. Members were trained in all types of rescue situations so that they could assist in bringing aid to people beset by accidents or disasters.

=== 1982 ===
A new American-style highway patrol was formed to operate on country highways in an effort to cut down the road toll. The patrol fleet was equipped with 53 V8 Ford Falcons with long range radios, as well as 84 Yamaha four cylinder 1100cc road motorcycles.

=== 1983 ===
The first Blood Splash Pattern Evaluation Course was held.

The Explosive Ordinance Reconnaissance Team was established which took the responsibility for bomb response from the Arson and Bomb Squad.

The Latin motto on shoulder patches was replaced by its English translation of Firmness with Courtesy.

=== 1984 ===
The Police Department's own computer system comes online and ends the shared arrangements with other government departments.

The Safety House Program commences and provides a safe place for children in the event they feel threatened.

Rain and mud hamper police attempts to remove protestors trying to prevent the construction of the Cape Tribulation to Bloomfield Road.

On 29 February Constable Michael Low was shot and killed attending a domestic dispute at North Rockhampton, Central Queensland. Constable Derek Pickless would be awarded the George Medal.

On 22 June Queensland motorcycle police establish the Guinness Book of Records world record for the number of riders on a motorcycle, when 35 police officers balance on a motorbike at Surfers Paradise Raceway.

=== 1985 ===
The Queensland police computer links to the Main Roads Department and the New South Wales police computer to increase access to information such as national stolen vehicles files.

Adopt-a-Cop Programme was introduced at Northgate State School, with Constable Michael Volk from Nundah Police Station eager to attend the school during lunch times to provide advice on road safety, bike safety and stranger danger.

Long batons were purchased for use by members of Brisbane Mobile Patrols and the Brisbane Traffic Branch.

=== 1986 ===
Queensland Police were officially linked to a central Finger-print Bureau in Sydney, which gives computer access to millions of prints throughout Australia and overseas.

The Department operates 1,092 vehicles.

There were 309 computer terminals in 121 locations. Training in computers was offered to cadets and probationaries at the Police Academy.

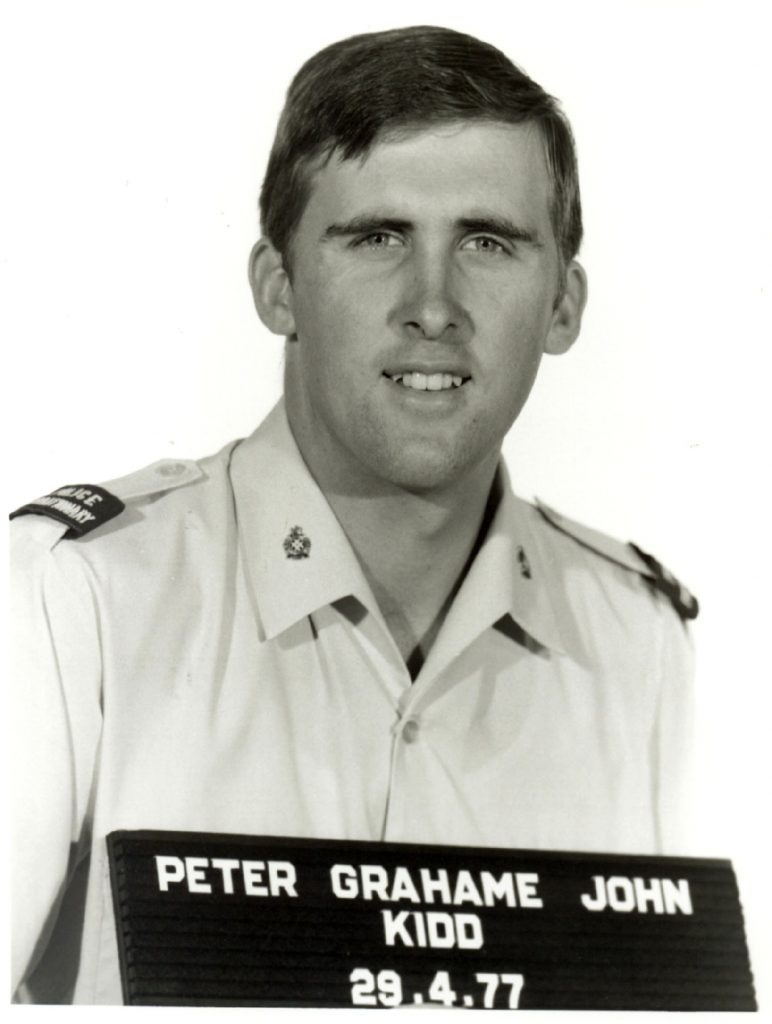
Induction photo taken of Constable Peter Kidd, 1977, killed on duty on 29 July 1987

=== 1987 ===
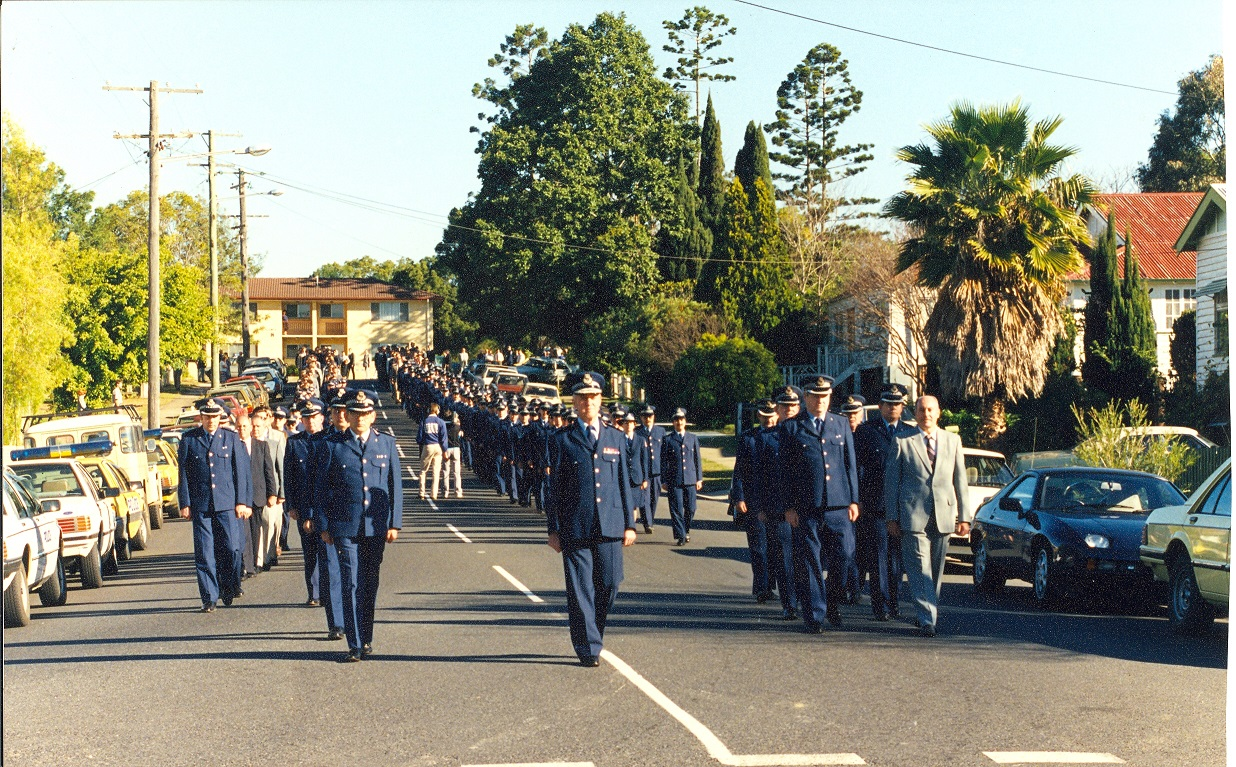
Hundreds of police march in the funeral procession for Senior Constable Peter Kidd, 31 July 1987

Under Police Commissioner Lewis the advancement of women was curtailed in most areas. The number of female sworn officers drops from over 8 per cent to 5 per cent.

The Transport, Radio and Electronics Sections, Brisbane Mobile Patrols, and Traffic Accident Investigation Squad (TAIS) relocate to Alderley from the Petrie Terrace Police Depot.

In March, in spite of 1971 legislative amendment allowing married women to join as police officers, Commissioner Lewis changed force policy to give discretion as to whether the married women could join or rejoin as female officers. This was on the basis that 'an officer's obligations to serve anywhere in the State could disrupt a married woman's family life', that there was enough of a problem with transferring married men, and there were sufficient single women applying to meet the official 'quota of one female to eight males'.

On 15 July, the Driver Training Wing is moved from Queensland Police Academy at Oxley, to the Mount Cotton driver training complex (until late 2010).

On 27 July the Commission of Inquiry into Possible Illegal Activities and Associated Police Misconduct ('Fitzgerald Inquiry') opens. It was a much needed, but painful organisational reform for the Queensland Police. Over the two years of the inquiry there were 238 hearings and 339 witnesses were called to give evidence.

On 29 July Senior Constable Peter Grahame John Kidd was shot and killed in a raid at Virginia, in north Brisbane. The raid was to recapture an extremely dangerous escapee from Long Bay Jail who had subsequently committed several armed robberies. Kidd was the first member of the Tactical Response Team to enter the house. Having been shot through a closed door, Kidd continued to push through the door and returned fire. He then collapsed and died in hospital. Hundreds of police marched in Kidd's funeral procession held on 31 July. He was posthumously awarded the Queensland Police Valour Medal and the Star of Courage.

On 21 September Ronald James Redmond becomes the Acting Police Commissioner.

=== 1988 ===
The Neighbourhood Watch Unit commences operation on 22 February after a successful pilot program conducted on the Gold Coast. The program aims to reduce preventable offences, improve personal and household security, reduce fear of crime, and provide support for victims of crime.

=== 1989 ===
Crime Stoppers was established. Its role is to gather information from the community that will lead to offenders being caught and prosecuted.

The first official video recording of a crime scene was conducted by the Photographic Section.

On 29 June Constable Brett Handran was shot and killed attending a domestic dispute in Wynnum, in east Brisbane.

Noel Newnham becomes sixteenth Police Commissioner on 1 November 1989.

== 1990s ==
=== 1990 ===
Fitzgerald Inquiry recommendations augment the change from the Queensland Police Force to Queensland Police Service. A new badge was designed and the motto "With Honour We Serve" was approved.

The first five female inspectors were appointed.

In May the Task Force was created in response to Fitzgerald Report recommendations. Its role was to support all regional commands through intelligence and coordination of crime operations.

COMFIT, the electronic composition of faces from witness descriptions was developed by the Photographic Section.

The first custom-built state police headquarters was constructed on the block bounded by Makerston, Roma and Garrick Streets.

The Fingerprint Bureau, Photographic and Scientific Sections move to the 4th floor of the new headquarters building under the umbrella of the Forensic Services Branch.

In September the new Police Communications Centre (PCC) benefits from a two-million-dollar ESCORT computer-aided dispatch (CAD) system that feeds instant information to mobile vehicles and foot patrols. The system was introduced which promises to improve the information available to, and increase the efficiency of, despatching police vehicles to incidents.

The Queensland Police Service Valour Award was introduced to recognise police officers who perform acts of exceptional bravery in hazardous circumstances. First awarded in 1990 to Constables Kyle Bates, Edward Bennet, Neil Paulsen and Senior Constable Brendan Carew for a sea rescue.

The Commissioner's Lantern Award was initiated to recognise and promote community-based policing. The inaugural 1991 winner was the Youth Assistance Panel project based in Townsville, joint initiative targeting petty juvenile offenders to provide a last chance before invoking the court system.

=== 1991 ===
The Queensland Anti-Discrimination Act reinforces merit-based criteria in employment and the number of female recruits stabilises around thirty-three per cent.

The Bureau of Criminal Intelligence develops and puts into operation the Queensland Intelligence Database with the ability to link nine different data categories.

The Police Overseas Service Medal was established on 25 April to acknowledge the overseas peace-keeping role of police officers. The medal was awarded with a clasp which details the area of service.

=== 1992 ===
The first female chief superintendent and superintendent were appointed.

Equal opportunity legislation in Public Employment Act gives legislative support to initiatives to improve the position of women. These include flexible work options, anti-harassment strategies and mentor support.

The Scientific Section relocates to the Roma Street Police Headquarters with more than 30 staff, many of whom specialise in a very select field of forensic identification.

Electronic Recording Section becomes part of Forensic Services Branch.

The first Police Beat Shopfront was trialled at Rockhampton's Kmart Plaza and becomes a permanent establishment in August. This initiative was designed to provide an effective policing presence in shopping centres and to improve communication with the community.

The Special Emergency Response Team (SERT) was established to respond to emergency situations and to provide operational police with specialist support. It was previously known as the Emergency Squad, and the Tactical Response Group.

An Executive Development Program commences to provide skills in strategic planning, policy development, resource management, and command and control to officers moving to commissioned rank.

James Patrick O'Sullivan becomes the seventeenth Police Commissioner on 1 November 1992.

=== 1993 ===
The offender identification computer system called Com-Fit was developed.

The Task Force becomes the State Crime Operations Command with a primary function to generate intelligence about organised and major crime; and to support regional police during major criminal investigations.

=== 1994 ===
The Public Safety Response Team was established as a full-time unit with a staff of forty-five.

On 24 October twelve passengers die on a Wide Bay Tours bus, when the bus crashes on the Gateway Motorway, Boondall, Brisbane. Police, ambulance, fire and emergency service workers, work together to assist the injured after the incident.

The Police Recruit Operational and Vocational Education (PROVE) program was introduced to allow recruit curricula to be run on a wholly in-Service basis. By this time, the standard issue service firearms were the Smith & Wesson Model 36 (5 shot), Model 10 (6 shot), Model 681 (6 shot), and the Sturm-Ruger Service-Six and GP100 (both 6 shot) revolvers.

Between 1994 and 1996 the Academy was renamed as the Queensland Police and Emergency Services Academy in acknowledgement of the continuing training initiative between the Queensland Police and Queensland Emergency Services.

In May, a new $3.3 million police complex, consisting of police station and watchhouse, was officially opened on Mornington Island. It was one of only four cyclone resistant buildings on the island and could be used as a cyclone shelter if required.

=== 1995 ===
In response to the recommendations of the Royal Commission into Aboriginal Deaths in Custody, the concept of police liaison officers (PLOs) was initiated on Thursday Island and later trialled in Townsville.

=== 1996 ===
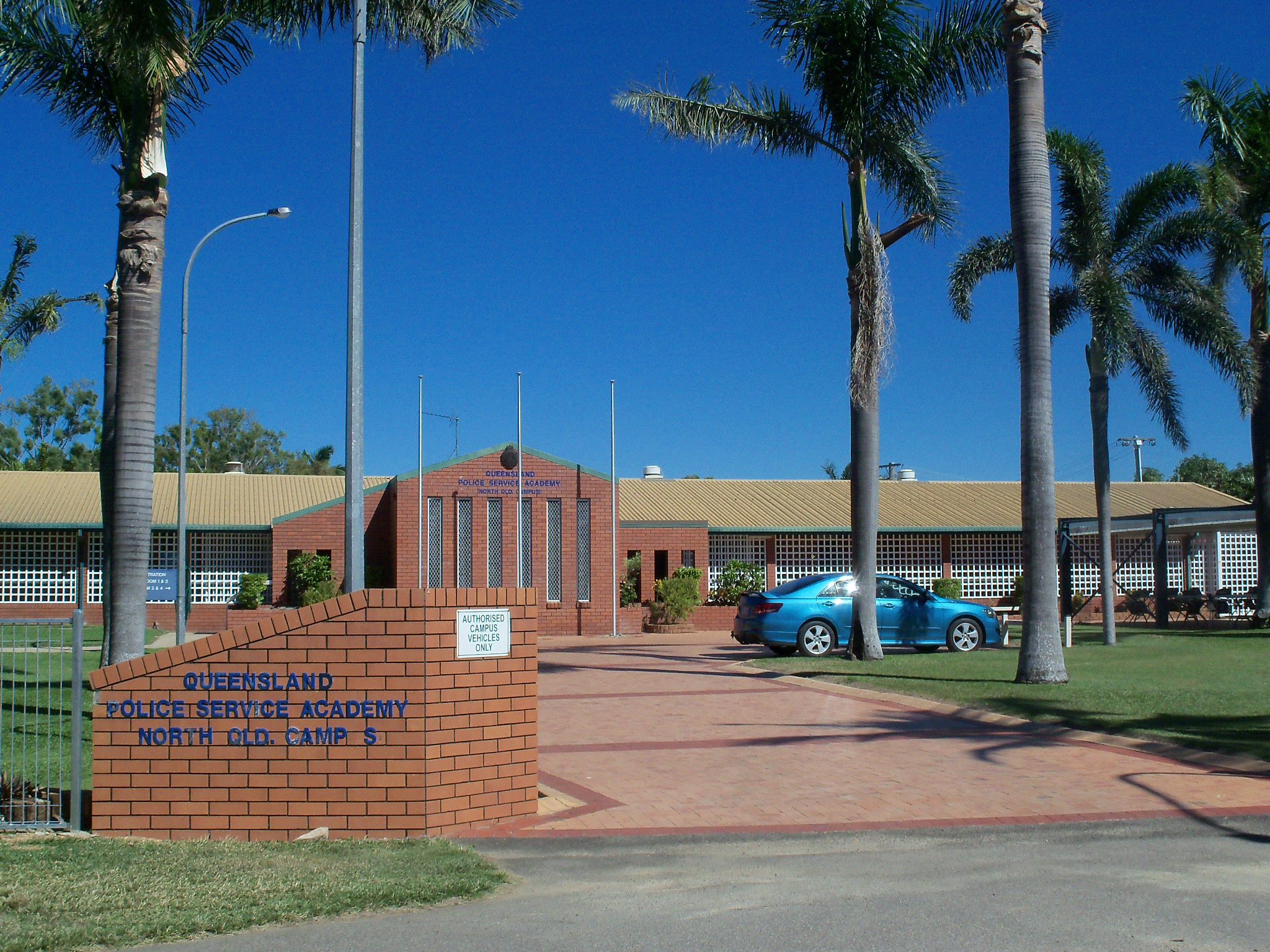
QPS Academy (NQ campus), 2011

On 21 May Constable Shayne Gill was struck and killed by a motor vehicle while on radar duty on the Bruce Highway near Glasshouse Mountains. A police vessel was subsequently named after Gill.

A second Academy campus, the North Queensland Campus of the Queensland Police Academy was established at Rowes Bay, Townsville to encourage recruitment in central and northern Queensland. The $3.5M facility opened for recruit training on 14 October, and 'Because of the number of staff, the 40 recruits will get plenty of attention, especially in the areas of law, police skills, communication, behavioural studies, sociology, autonomous learning and decision making'. The second campus in part was intended to assist recruiting numbers in north Queensland.

=== 1997 ===
The Violent Crime Analysis Unit was established to analyse victimology, modus operandi, offender information, forensic data and behavioural patterns.

The Volunteers in Policing (VIP) trial program was initiated in September. VIP duties at police stations include victim support, witness support, customer service, school support and community liaison.

=== 1998 ===
Bicycles patrols were re-introduced to Brisbane after a successful trial.

The Interactive Crime Scene Recording System was developed by the Photographic Section.

The laser speed gun was introduced; it uses LIDAR (Light Detection and Ranging).

A range of new equipment was introduced which includes extendable batons, hinged handcuffs and Glock firearms.

=== 1999 ===
Women make up 17.36 per cent of officer personnel. The number of female police officers increases steadily by approximately one per cent per year.

The Queensland Police Service Medal was introduced on 1 January, to recognise the diligent and ethical service by members of the Queensland Police Service.

The Queensland Government transfers the community police function from community councils at Woorabinda, Yarrabah and on Badu Island, to the Queensland Police as a 12-month pilot. These officers were known as Queensland Aboriginal and Torres Strait Islander Police (QATSIP).

== 2000s ==
=== 2000 ===
Kathleen Rynders was the first policewoman to achieve the rank of assistant commissioner and in 2008 becomes the first woman to rise to the rank of deputy commissioner.

All manual fingerprints filing systems were replaced by the National Automated Fingerprint Identification System allowing all states to share fingerprint information.

The DNA Implementation Unit was established to facilitate the introduction of new legislation allowing the QPS to use DNA as a forensic investigative tool for offences such as such as assault occasioning bodily harm, rape, and murder.

The Crime Prevention Personal Safety Team develops a larger than life wooden figure named "Duncan" to assist in teaching children to pay attention to their gut feelings when they feel in danger.

On 21 July 2000 Senior Constable Norman Watt, 33, was shot and killed during an armed stand-off near Rockhampton in Central Queensland.

Robert 'Bob' Atkinson becomes the eighteenth Police Commissioner on 1 November 2000.

=== 2002 ===
In March 2002 coordination and security for Commonwealth Heads of Government Meeting was managed by the Queensland Police Service. More than 4,000 police and staff members take part in the security operation, the largest security operation ever staged by the Queensland Police.

A dedicated cold case team was established within the Homicide Investigation Group.

=== 2003 ===
Constable Mokhtiar Singh creates history as the first identifying-Sikh to be inducted as a Queensland police officer. His uniform includes an adaptation of the traditional Indian turban in recognition of his cultural heritage and religious beliefs.

Thirteen Queensland Disaster Victim Identification Squad officers were deployed to Bali, as part of an Australian contingent, to assist the Indonesian Government following the terrorist attack.

The Queensland Police Service Academy delivers a Justice Entry Program targeted at Aboriginal and Torres Strait Islander people.

On 22 August 2003 Senior Sergeant Perry Irwin, 42, was shot while investigating reports of gunfire in bushland at Caboolture, north of Brisbane.

=== 2004 ===
Queensland police begins the sharing and searching of DNA samples from people and crime scenes at a national level on the newly operating National Criminal Investigative DNA Database (NCIDD).

=== 2005 ===
In February the Service opens a Police Dog Development Complex, hoping that their own dog breeding facility will overcome a general lack of trainable dogs.

Bright red, two-door Holden Monaro highway patrol cars were introduced.

As at 30 June there were 9310 police officers and 3153 staff members.

The "Forensic Register" was fully deployed for remote data entry to provide a "paperless" case file solution at a scene of crime. All forensic film based cameras were replaced with digital SLR cameras to record crime scenes.

Three new Queensland police awards were established: the Commissioner's Commendation for Bravery, Commissioner's Certificate for Notable Action and Commissioner's Award for Meritorious or Special Service.

The Commissioner's Commendation for Bravery was first awarded to Senior Sergeant Mathew Rosevear, Sergeants Robert Duncan and Richard Downie; Constables Glen Lamont, Kim Adamson and John Lima.

The eligibility criteria for the Police Overseas Service Medal originally established in 1999, were amended to enable recognition of humanitarian service provided in response to national disasters overseas. First awarded to senior sergeants Kenneth Rach and Scott McLaren for their disaster victim identification work after the Thailand tsunami in 2014.

Queensland police, Cardwell Lions Club and Cardwell Coast Guard go into partnership to provide free EPIRBs to departing bush walkers on the Thorsborne Trail on Hinchinbrook Island and Herbert River Gorge walk. The project aims to help rescuers find lost or injured hikers more quickly.

On 18 July 2007, Constable Brett Irwin, 33, was shot and killed while executing an arrest warrant for breach of bail at Keperra, in northwest Brisbane.

=== 2006 ===
QPRIME (Queensland Police Records Information Management Exchange) a major new policing information system was launched. The system is used to record and manage all reportable police incidents. It allows easier access to information, less time is spent searching for information in different systems and reduces manual and paper-based processes.

The Live-scan fingerprint scanning system was successfully rolled out across the State. These units were connected to the Crimtrac National Automated Fingerprint Identification System in Canberra.

=== 2007 ===
The Photographic Section goes digital and acquires a digital mini-lab which means that photos taken at any Queensland crime scene were processed and printed almost immediately.

=== 2008 ===
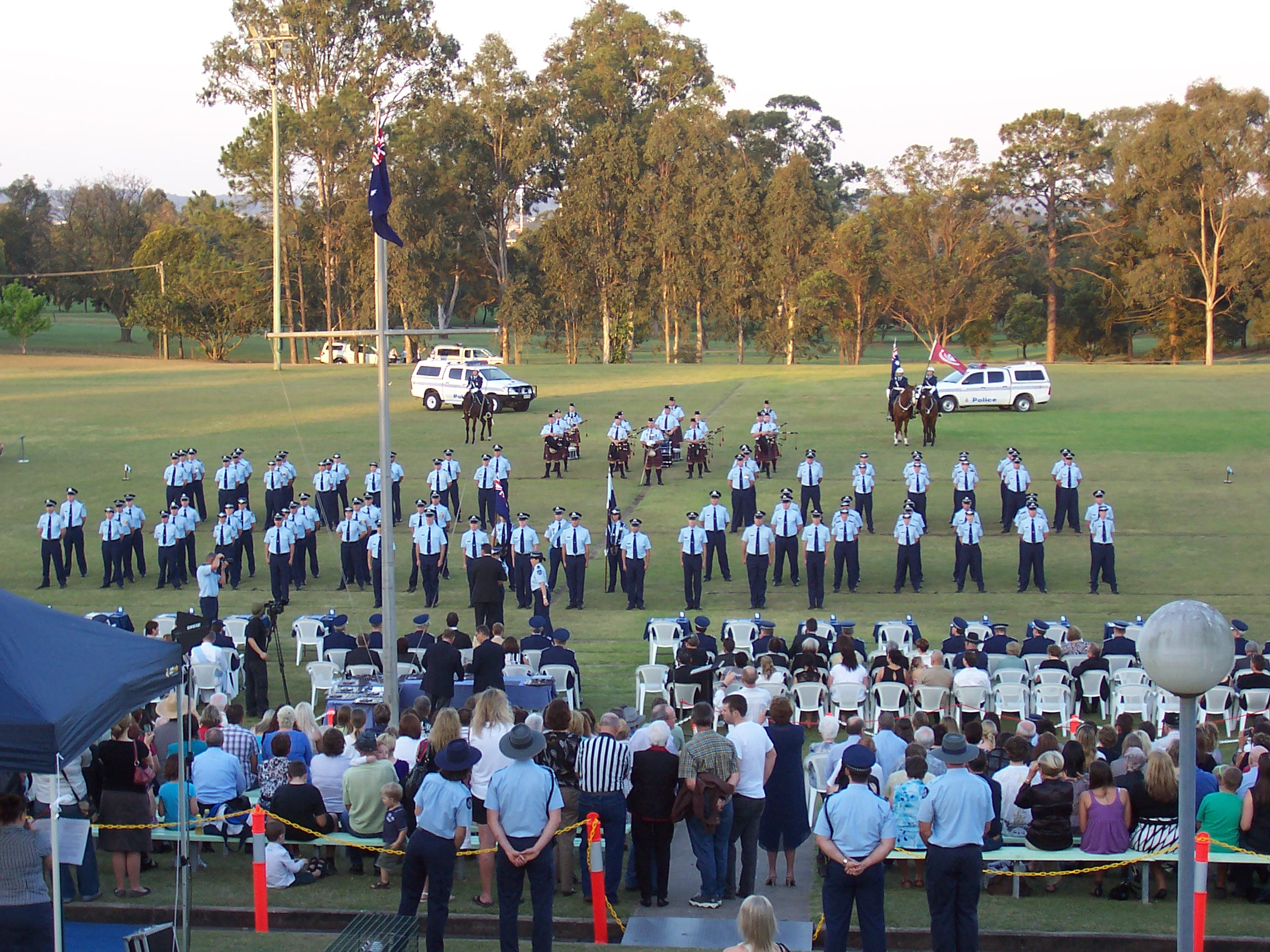
Induction parade on Oxley campus oval, 2009

Operation Achilles concludes after more than two years of investigation resulting in the simultaneous execution of warrants across the world and the arrests of child sex offenders in Australia, the United States, Germany and the United Kingdom.

The publication of district-based Neighbourhood Watch Crime Bulletins was launched in Cairns in October. Crime bulletins provided information to the community to assist in clearing offences, and to provide details about crime prevention initiatives.

=== 2009 ===
The eligibility criterion of the Queensland Police Service Medal was changed and was made available to living former members who served prior to the introduction of the medal in 1999.

Newly designed patches and epaulettes were introduced. Epaulettes for the ranks of senior sergeant and below, now incorporate the words "Queensland Police".

Following a July 2007 trial, it was announced in December 2008 that commencing January 2009, by December 2010 all officers would have access to a 'conducted energy device', the TASER X26, to 'protect the public and prevent unnecessary injuries to police and offenders'.

== 2010s ==
=== 2010 ===
Policelink was established to provide an alternative point of contact for reporting non-urgent offences or incidents and for general police inquiries. A new national non-urgent police number was introduced.

The National Police Service Medal was established on 9 November and recognises the special status that police officers have because of their role protecting the community and represents a police officer's past and future commitment to give ethical and diligent service. A minimum of 15 years service is required to qualify for the medal.

Communications room operator Andrew Heinrich took a call at the Ipswich Police Communications Centre around 9 pm on 25 September and remains calm and in control as he gives the mother CPR instructions to resuscitate her unconscious baby girl.

The Fortitude Valley police station redevelopment project comprises two stages, the construction of a two-level "operational" building and the refurbished of the existing 1936 building.

Driver training moves from the Mount Cotton driver training complex (which commenced use in 1983) to a new purpose-built track at the Wacol campus of the Queensland Police Service Academy. The new area included of 2.5 kilometres (1.6 mi) road circuits; a technically challenging urban simulation environment including traffic lights, roundabouts and building facades; a dedicated off-road skills circuit for both four-wheel-drive and trail-bike training; and two sealed surface, large vehicle manoeuvring areas, including controlled irrigation.

=== 2011 ===
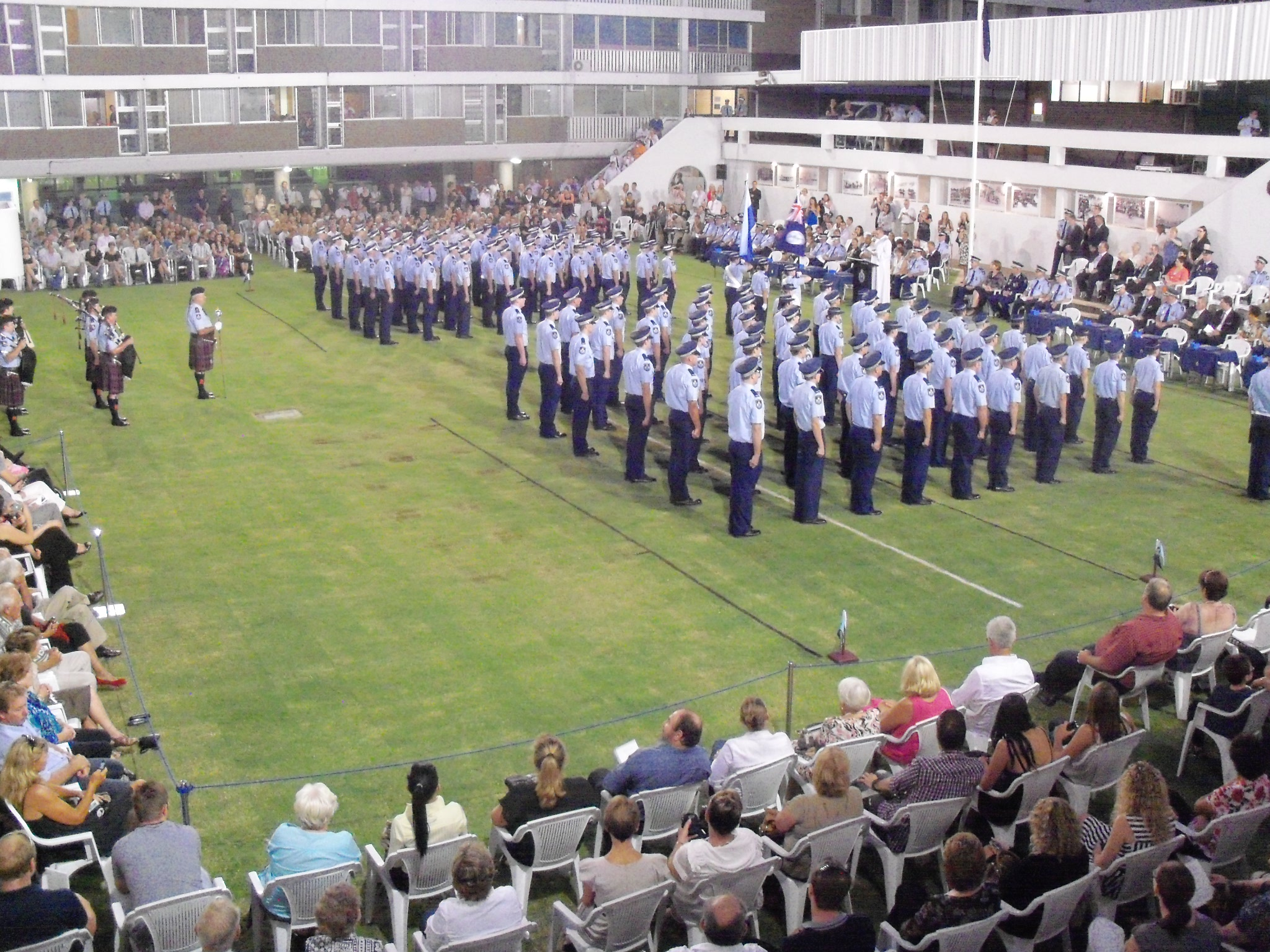
Induction parade on Oxley campus 'Sacred Acre', 2011

Eight years after thirteen year old Daniel Morcombe was abducted from a Sunshine Coast road, an extensive police investigation locates and charges his killer with murder.

The use of automatic number plate recognition technology was launched statewide. The initial launch consisted of one unit being located at the State Traffic Support Branch for use in statewide traffic operations involving both specialist and local police.

The floods of 2011 initiate the first use of Facebook and Twitter by the QPS Media and Public Affairs Branch to forge a direct link with the community by using social media to issue accurate information and dispel rumours.

Unprecedented floods affects much of Queensland and police were involved in all manner of support, including victim identification, missing persons coordination, anti-looting patrol and countless rescues in all manner of vehicles and vessels.

On 29 May 2011 Detective Senior Constable Damien Leeding (CIB) was shot when he confronted an armed offender at the Pacific Pines Tavern on the Gold Coast. Leeding died in hospital on 1 June three days after being shot.

In November 2011, a police helicopter 'Polair' was commenced, funded by the Gold Coast City Council. Polair 2 based in Archerfield, Brisbane, commenced in 2012. Including a Eurocopter BO 105 Super Five, the fleet was updated with Bell 429 helicopters in February 2022.

=== 2012 ===
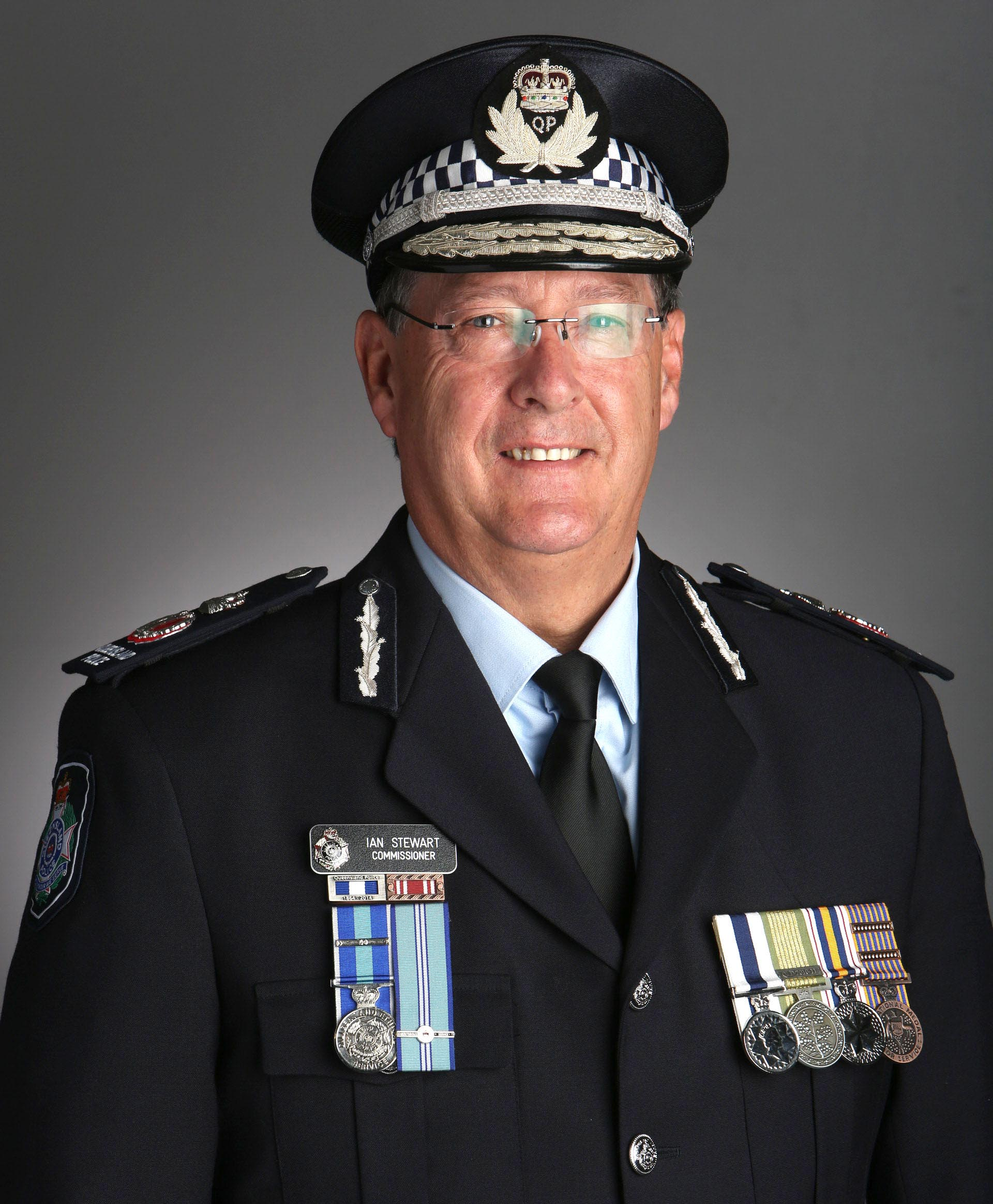
Queensland Police Commissioner, Ian Stewart, 2017

The introduction and implementation of the ANPR project delivers significant improvement and efficiencies in frontline traffic operations.

The new "Police Recruit Pathway" selects applicants based on physical health and fitness, personal integrity, cognitive ability and literacy, psychological suitability, life and work experience and practical policing skills.

Ian Duncan Hunter Stewart becomes the nineteenth Police Commissioner on 1 November 2012.

=== 2013 ===
A new recruit program commences in January that increasingly expects recruits to perform realistic policing roles.

On 3 March an armed gunman brings business in the Queen Street Mall in Brisbane to a halt. The situation was brought under control by the swift action of operational police and the Special Emergency Response Team.

The Fatal 5 campaign on Holden HSV motor cars, was launched which adds "inattention" to "speed", "seat belts", "drink driving" and "driving tired" as the main causes of traffic incidents. The campaign was designed to catch the attention of road users and prompt them to be more careful on the roads.

Under the Queensland Police Renewal Program the newly named State Crime Command includes the Child Safety and Sexual Crime Group, Drug and Serious Crime Group, Fraud and Cyber Crime Group and the Homicide Group.

The strength of the Queensland Police Service at 30 June was 11,055 police officers, 371 police recruits and 3705 staff members.

On 1 July, a new structure was approved and which means the reduction of regions from eight to five and districts from thirty to fifteen.

Women make up more than twenty-five per cent of police officer personnel and serve in many varied roles across the State.

The most northerly police station was on Thursday Island, the most southerly police station was at Hungerford, the most westerly station was at Camooweal and the most easterly police station was at Coolangatta.

On 1 July the Forensic Services Group forms as a result of the QPS review. It consisted of more than 550 staff and encompasses all district scenes of crime units, the Fingerprint Bureau, the Forensic Intelligence Unit, and the DNA management, Photographic and Electronic Recording and Scientific sections. The FSG processes in excess 150,000 requests for service and positively identifies or links several thousand suspects to their crime each year.

The mobile data pilot for smartphones and tablets, dubbed QLiTEs, was rolled in October as part of the move to provide the technology required by police to keep the community safe.

At the Queensland Police Excellence Awards, Southern Region wins the Gold Lantern Award for Excellence in Problem-Oriented and Partnership for their "Stay on Track Outback" initiative which aims to enhance road safety on the rural and remote highways of outback Queensland.

New uniform material was approved which is lighter in weight and more breathable. The cloth is treated with a flash dry and incorporates a percentage of stretch for comfort and ease.

Following the Police and Community Safety Review (PaCSR) report delivered September 2013, commissioned by the Newman Ministry of the Queensland Government, the Public Safety Business Agency (PSBA) was created on 1 November 2013 to bring together the corporate and business support resources of Queensland Police Service and the Department of Corrective Services, to service the whole portfolio. This involved human relations, information technology, finance and other administrative areas being subsumed by the new agency.

There were more than 450 police establishments spread across the State.

=== 2014 ===
The department celebrated their 150th anniversary. A unit citation was awarded to all employees.

=== 2016 ===
Following a review, the Public Safety Business Agency (PSBA) was restructured in July 2016, which also resulted in some restructure of the Queensland Police Service.

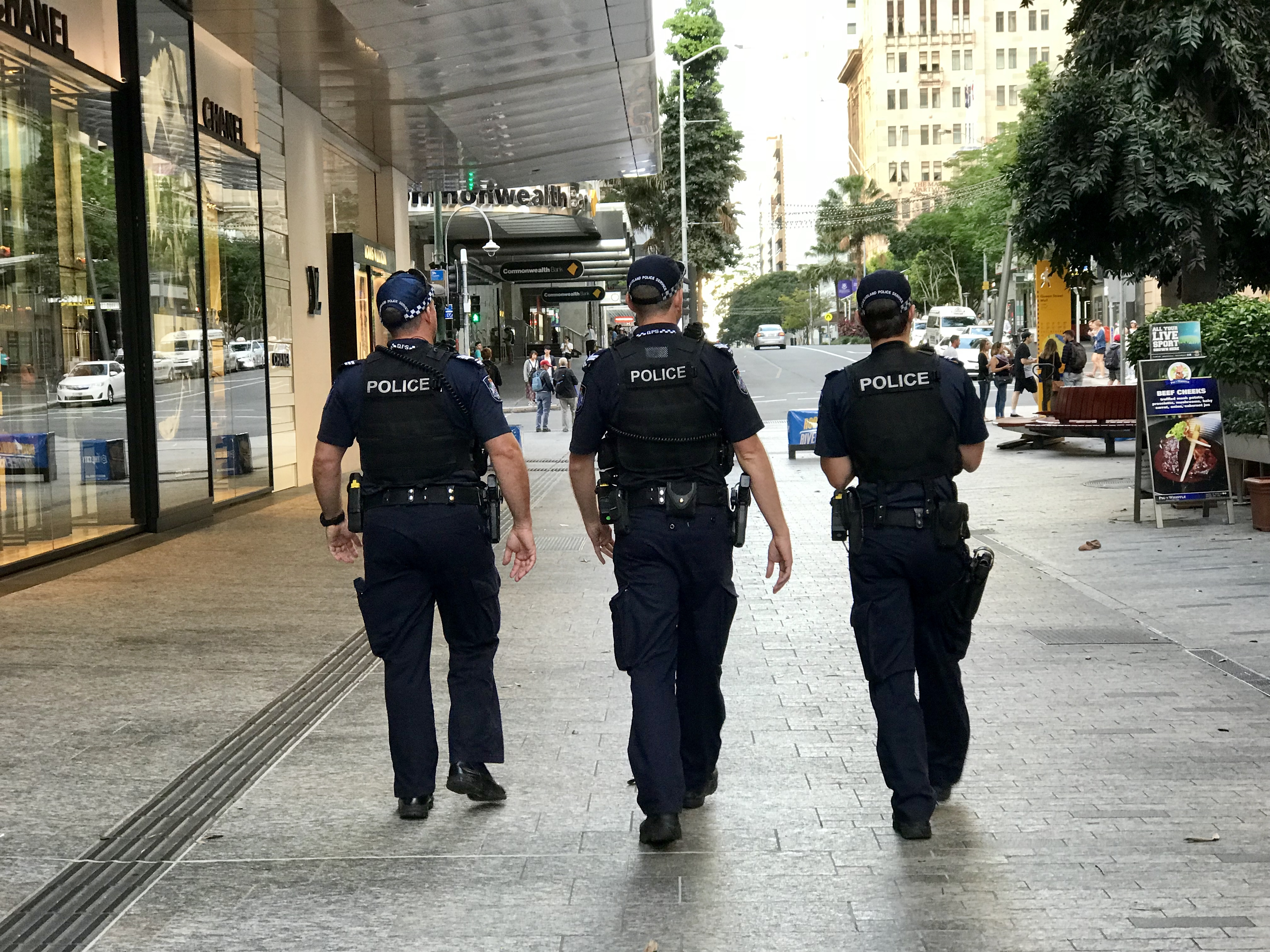
On the beat, 2018

=== 2017 ===
On 29 May 2017, Senior Constable Brett Forte was shot and killed at Adare, north of Gatton, after attempting to apprehend a suspected offender. The gunman was shot and killed the next day by police while trying to escape after a siege in a farmhouse at Ringwood, north-west of Gatton. On 8 June 2018, the police helicopter Polair 2 was named Brett A. Forte in his honour. POLAIR 2 had provided air support during the siege. Coronial findings in March 2023 found there may have been some contributing systematic organisational factors, including failing to follow up on earlier reports of firearm activity in the area, and a 'significant failure of leadership' to assign a tactical commander during the pursuit.

=== 2019 ===
Katarina Carroll became the twentieth Police Commissioner in July 2019 and its first female police commissioner. She joined the police service in 1983.

== 2020s ==
=== 2020 ===
In February 2020 a new organisational restructure (since the November 2013 and July 2016 restructures) was announced as the 'Service Alignment Program', including designating a deputy commissioner for north Queensland, and the dividing of the Northern Region into two. The program was 'to better align resources based on capability and service delivery', and to continue 'to move towards a policing model that is focussed on prevention, disruption, investigation and response'. The frontline service delivery mode was closed down in May 2023, and was never rolled out statewide.

From March 2020, employees of the organisation were heavily involved in supporting Queensland Health in a response to containing the spread of COVID-19 pandemic within Queensland, on the state borders, airports, and checking persons self-quarantining.

The $52.8 million Bob Atkinson Operational Capabilities Centre (BAOCC) at the developing Wacol campus of the Queensland Police Service Academy opened on 28 September 2020. The facility included two indoor firearms ranges as well as a Hogan's Alley of a train station platform, houses, pub, post office, fast food outlet, shopping mall, a multi-storey office and retail building, service station, police station, bus stop, mobile caravan village, and open parkland.

=== 2021 ===
Following the death of a couple at Alexandra Hills Brisbane on 26 January 2021 involving a 17-year-old male alleged to be on drugs and on bail, youth using a stolen vehicle trying to ram police vehicle in Townsville on 30 January 2021, and the death of a motorcycle rider by persons pursuing a stolen vehicle on 5 February 2021, the Commissioner in days after announced the creation of a new 'Youth Crime Taskforce' headed by an assistant commissioner.

Following the death of a woman by her ex-partner, the Domestic, Family Violence and Vulnerable Persons Command was established in February 2021, relocated and promoted to command level, from another command.

May 2021 saw the release of the Crime and Corruption Commission report into a 50% female police recruit hiring target. Put in place in 2015 by then-Commissioner Stewart, an ambiguity as to whether this was a direction or 'aspirational target', the investigation found the practices to be discriminatory and 'corrupt manipulation'. The practice was ceased in January 2018.

=== 2022 ===
On 11 May, the State Government announced a commission of inquiry to examine policing responses to domestic and family violence (DFV) prevention, with possible systemic cultural issues within the organisation, and whether there was the capability, capacity, and structure to respond to the violence. This followed the recommendations of a domestic violence taskforce and several coronial inquests. After a reluctance to appear, Commissioner Carroll appeared before the Commission on Thursday, 19 August 2022, where misogynistic comments of a superintendent and a deputy commissioner were reported, disbelief in complaints to be genuine of sexual assaults by female complainants, and the staffing to the February 2021 renamed-and-relocated Domestic, Family Violence and Vulnerable Persons Command was increased by four members to total 27 staff whereas the media section had been increased to 38 staff. One of the four deputy commissioners resigned on the Friday afternoon.

It was announced in late October 2022, that the Service would become the host of the State Emergency Service, and the Marine Rescue Service; these services devolving from the Queensland Fire and Emergency Service.

On Friday 10 November 2022, the Queensland Audit Office report was presented into the effectiveness of state public sector entities to handle DFV responses. There were twenty-one recommendations, nine of which were to be actioned by the police service. Recommendations including doing a root cause analysis into delayed response times by officers to DFV incidents, and mandatory annual face-to-face DFV training.

Separately on Monday 14 November 2022, the DFV Commission of Inquiry tabled its report to the Premier. Highlighting problems of misogyny and racism, and lack of leadership, seventy-eight recommendations were made, including better demand recording systems, robust and regular training of officers, and establishing of an independent police integrity unit within the Crime and Corruption Commission to deal with all complaints in relation to police.

A fifth deputy commissioner position was to be created after 1 December 2022.

On 12 December 2022, two officers were killed along with a neighbour, and two other officers attacked, by three armed members of the Train family at the Wieambilla police shootings, near Dalby, southern Queensland. The officers had visited to make inquiries about one member of the Train family who had been reported as a missing person.

=== 2023 ===
Following issues in 2022 with recruiting and retention including cancelling a training intake, burdening daily paperwork, lack of confidence in the organisation's leadership, rising officer attrition of 3% to 5.5%, whilst relaxing recruiting standards, the Service in February 2023 sought to attract up to 500 officers from overseas jurisdictions per year over five years to boost recruitment. (By November 2022, the Service had only recruited 401 of the 1450 police officer 2020 government pledge by 2025. A November 2023 report by the Queensland Audit Office found the Service did not have a strategic planning for workforces and the growth target was not informed by evidence-based calls-for-service demands.)

As part of the addition of the SES and marine rescue, and recommendations from the various inquiries, and general administration, the organisational structure changed on 27 February 2023. The deputy commissioner portfolios of Regional Queensland, and Southern Queensland became Regional Operations, and Regional Services. Other senior portfolios were now Strategy and Corporate Services, Specialist Operations, Disaster and Emergency Management, State Discipline, and the Special Coordinator for police and emergency services reform.

In July 2023, the first 'Special Constable (State Officer)' was appointed and commenced at Longreach; the role legislated in April 2023 to address the mandatory police officer age retirement of sixty years-of-age by appointing retirees to continue with the same powers and authorities of regular officers. The role was created in part to address attracting and retaining officers.

In October 2023, the Commissioner admitted the recruiting entry standards had been lowered, and recruit training had been extended from 6.5 to 8 months. It was also noted increasing domestic violence calls (30% increase in the previous year), mental health jobs, and youth offending were escalating police workloads, and 50% of officers were considering separating in the next two years.

With many police-specific Queensland Honours, in the second half of the year the Service introduced two new medals, the Queensland Police Emergency Response Medal and the Queensland Police Blue Heart Medal.

=== 2024 ===
To address recruiting issues, the state government offered incentives of up to A$20,000 towards HECS or HELP tertiary education fees, or A$20,000 for interstate and overseas officer applicants to relocate; additional to increased cost-of-living allowances and free Academy accommodation. The 2023 recruitment marketing campaign, Challenging, Rewarding, Policing (replacing the previous We don't do boring), resulted in the highest number of recruits in training, namely 683 recruits, at the Oxley and North Queensland campuses. The campaign targeting New Zealand officers had the tagline 'warmer days and higher pays'.

On 19 February 2024, Commissioner Katarina Carroll announced an early separation of 1 March 2024, several months prior to contract expiry. The Commissioner and government had been under pressure of youth offending, and responses to a 25% increase in domestic violence.

On 27 February 2024, the Supreme Court of Queensland ruled the 2021 Commissioner-mandated COVID-19 vaccinations of all police officers and staff members that there were no grounds under the Judicial Review Act 1991 (Qld) for unreasonableness, but breached the Human Rights Act 2019 (Qld) as proper consideration to human rights was not made.

On Monday 22 April 2024, Steve Gollschewski, a long-term deputy commissioner was confirmed as the twenty-first Commissioner, and immediately embarked on a coastal provincial tour with Police Minister Ryan and Premier Miles. With Gold Coast's Polair [1] commencing as a trial in November 2011, Brisbane's 'Polair 2' commencing in July 2014, and Townsville's Polair launched on 16 January 2024, the tour saw the announcements of forthcoming funding for Polair in Cairns, and the Sunshine Coast/Wide Bay.

On Monday 3 June 2024, following the October 2022 review, the existing State Emergency Service (SES) and the newly named Marine Rescue Queensland (MRQ) commenced under the Service, in accordance with the State Emergency Service Act 2024 and Marine Rescue Queensland Act 2024 respectively. With their own chief officers, the organisations are hosted by the Service; the SES previously under the Queensland Fire and Emergency Service (which on 1 July 2024 becomes the Queensland Fire Department under the Fire Services Act 1990). MRQ was created as a consolidation of marine rescue volunteer associations, supported by the Australian Volunteer Coast Guard Association and Volunteer Marine Rescue Queensland.

On Tuesday 29 October 2024, with a days-old new government committing to an extra 1600 officers by 2028 (with a current 12 2000 officer strength), the Service indicated a possible multi-million dollar budget blow-out for the 2024–2025 financial year. A core concern was an unfunded $116 million fifteen-year lease for a new Stones Corner police station at South Brisbane, followed by both an external financial audit into the circumstances, and a police self-referral to the Crime and Corruption Commission. An executive staff member took leave on the same day the referral was announced. (The CCC report was presented two years later on 5 November 2026.)

The Queensland Human Rights Commission diversity review into the Service found systemic discrimination towards women and First Nations people, after interviewing 2800 current and former employees, 'driven by outdated processes and attitudes', with a need for leadership.

=== 2025 ===
On 11 February 2025, the Minister for Police, Dan Purdie, announced an independent review into the structure and operations of the Service, and placed promotions of senior officers on hold; whilst the new Commissioner has still to complete his first twelve months, at a time when Victoria Police officers put in a vote of no confidence on their Commissioner, followed by Northern Territory Correctional Services' Commissioner. However, it was noted there was no terms of reference provided for the review, no official cabinet or ministerial statement released, had no diversity of membership (being conducted by three former Service senior officers), and was just another of many recent reviews: 2013 restructure by the then-Commissioner, 2019 external review indicating the restructure failed most performance criteria, 2022 commission of inquiry into police culture regarding domestic violence, the 2023 external review into the problematic 2021 Service Delivery Redesign Project, 2023 Queensland Audit Office report about resource deployment and narrow short-term focus, and the 2024 Queensland Human Rights Commission report.

The resulting 128-page review made 65 recommendations, found significant officer burn-out, limited wellbeing support, impeding non-core responsibilities, and high attrition among the younger-serving officers. Another organisational restructure was going to be undertaken. (For previous restructures, see entries for July 2013, November 2016, and February 2020.)

In November 2025, the coronial findings from the December 2022 Wieambilla shootings were released with ten recommendations, including mandatory mental health checks for intending weapons licence applicants, more training for Triple Zero operators, improved interagency information sharing, and review of police drone capabilities. There was also a concern about radio blackspots.

"Campaign 300" was a transport department initiative launched in January 2007, to reduce the state road toll to under 300 deaths annually. Actions included more speed cameras, roadside drug testing, audible line markings, double demerit points for repeat speed offenders, and drink driver vehicle impoundment. Complaints were being made by November 2025 of a 50% drop in police road safety enforcement over the recent five years, which was attributed to a "stretched workforce", and changed driver behaviour since COVID-19. The lack of roadside breath tests were noted, where it was expected to be one test per licensed driver annually. This resulted in a sixteen-year high in the annual Queensland road toll. Electronic scooter and electronic bikes were starting to feature in the fatalities.

There was ongoing discontent within the police officer union membership about a negotiated pay deal with the Service and the government in July and persisting to November 2025, with lack of recognition and compensation for the role. In December 2025 a Queensland Industrial Relations Commission submission was made by the commissioned officers union stating the Commissioner had not followed position appointments based on merit, but through favouritism. It was already noted in April 2025 of the "low morale, decreasing trust in leadership", whilst the public confidence in the state police by October 2025 was at a ten-year low.

=== 2026 ===
The sudden selection and appointment of a new commissioner to replace Gollschewski, who was resigning due to health reasons on Friday 20 February 2026, was scrutinised. A coffee meeting by the police commissioner and minister determined a new commissioner was needed, and Brett Pointing could commence within a few weeks; without any formal advertising and selection process, suggesting lack of transparency and accountability. The government news release later clarified the appointment was for twelve months.

A financial review commenced in January 2026 and presented in June 2026 found an anticipated $400 million overspend due to poor accountability and financial controls over a decade by senior members. Twenty-one recommendations were made regarding "defiance of government decisions", and "certain matters" have been referred to the Crime and Corruption Commission. Staff member positions had been increased by about 600 positions than supported by allocated funding.

On 5 November 2026, after two full years since its initiation, the Crime and Corruption Commission report into $116M fifteen-year building lease at Stones Corner was presented. It was found the lease cost exceeded the building purchase cost, was not fit-for-purpose as a police station, and the process suffered from governance and control weaknesses. Investigation Sphynx recommendations included encouraging policies to be followed, running some awareness sessions, and design "an action plan to address systemic organisational culture issues". The QPS continues to pay the leasing costs, whilst still not using the building.
