= Women in law enforcement =

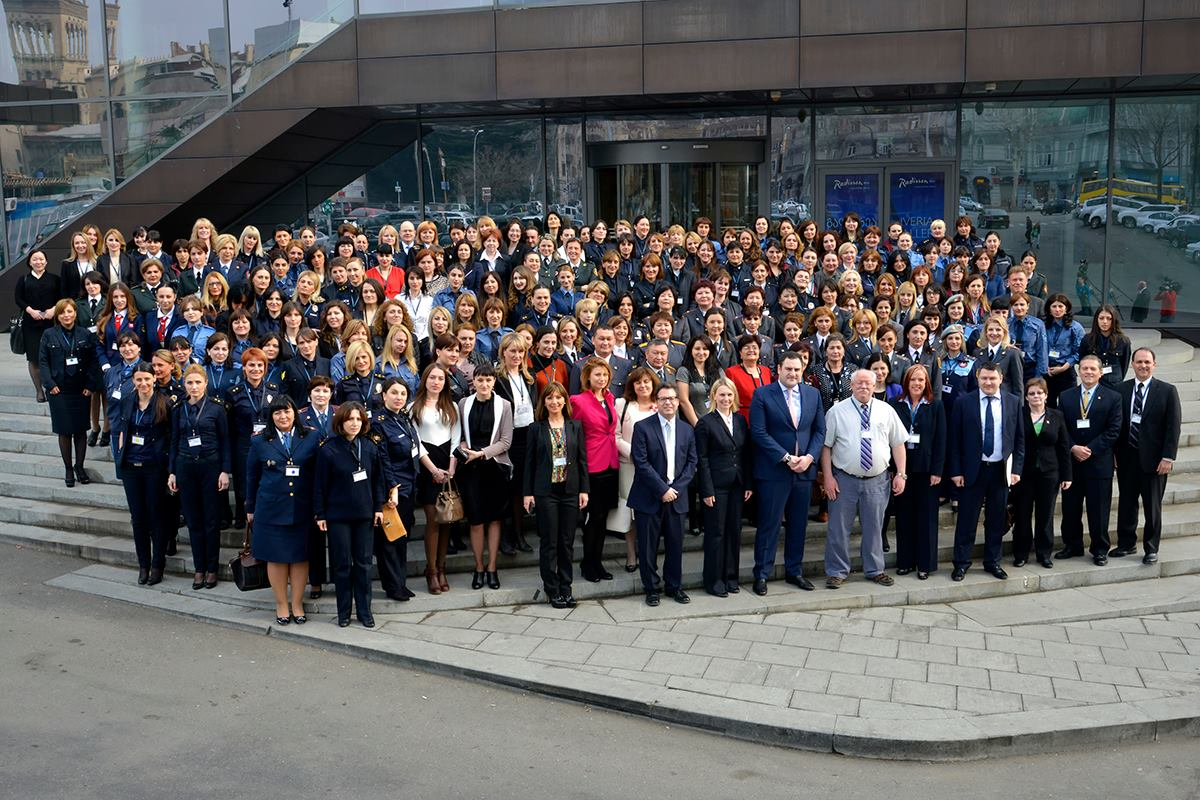
Delegates of the 3rd Annual Women in Policing Conference in Tbilisi, Georgia.

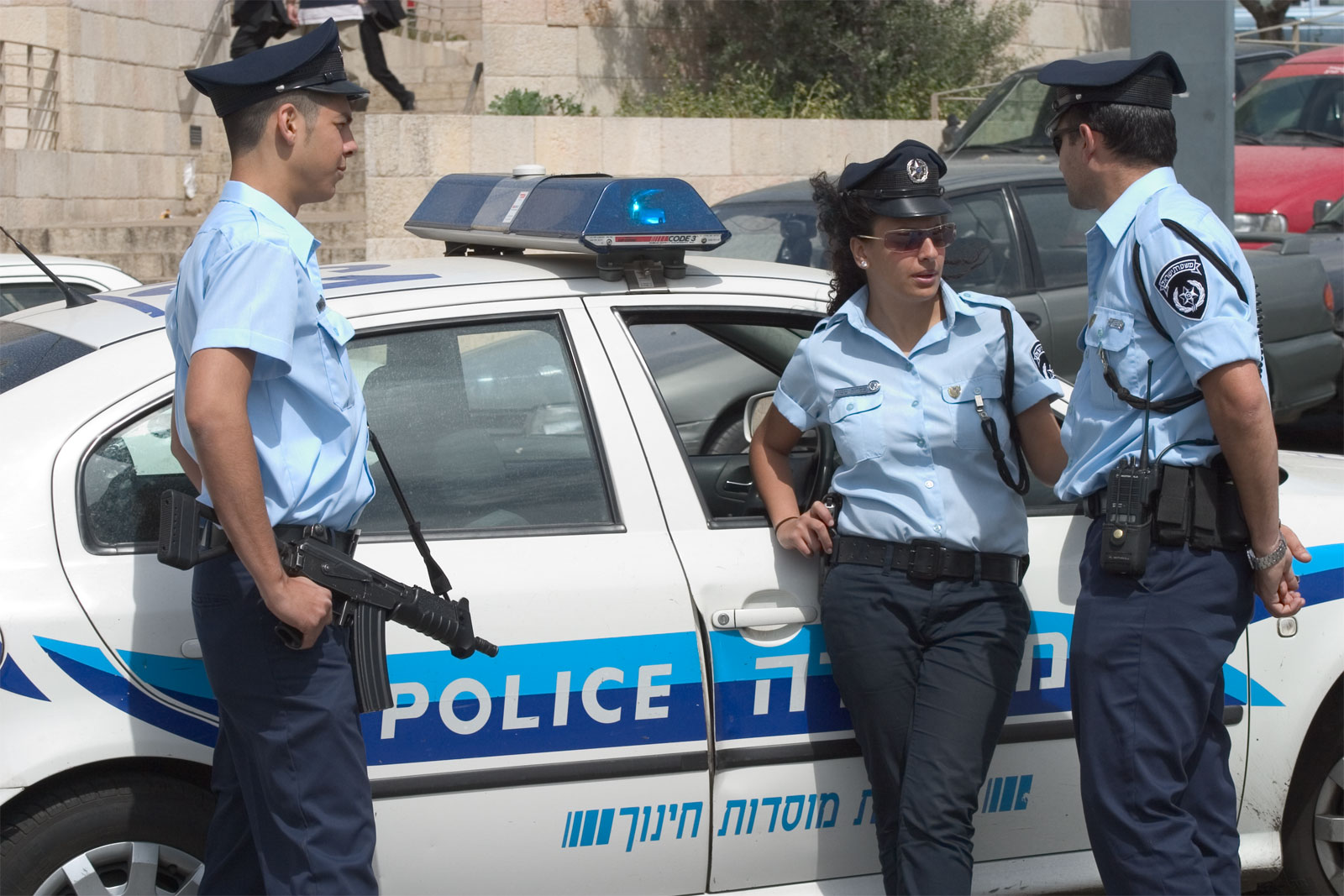
Israeli policemen and woman

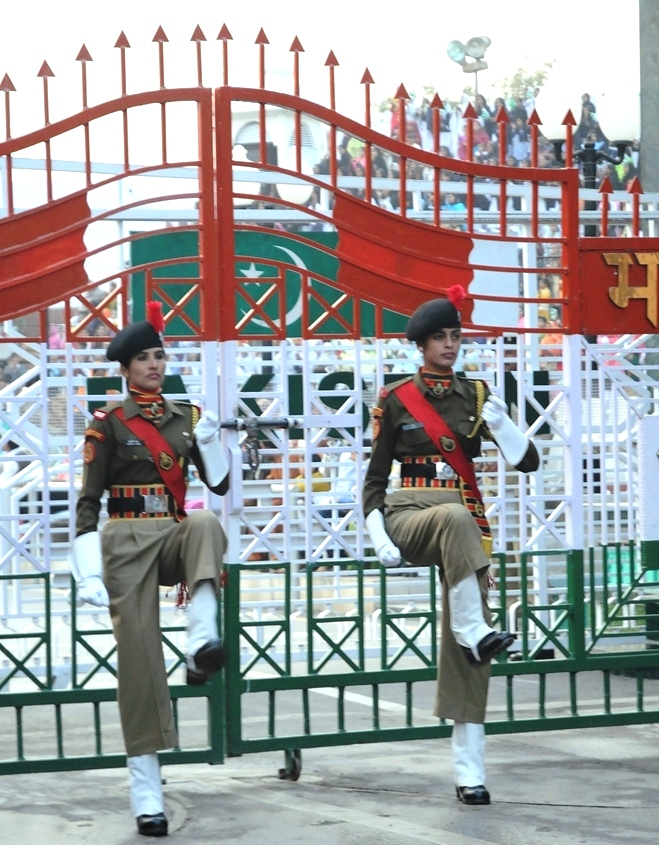
Female personnel of India's Border Security Force

The integration of women into law enforcement positions can be considered a large social change. Within industrialized nations in the early 1900s, there were few jobs open to women in law enforcement; however, timelines vary for developing nations. Within industrialized nations, a small number of women worked as correctional officers, and their assignments were usually limited to peripheral tasks. Women traditionally worked in juvenile facilities, handled crimes involving female offenders, or performed clerical tasks. In these early days, women were not considered as capable as men in law enforcement. Recently, many options have opened up, creating new possible careers.

== Overview by country ==
=== Australia ===
The first female police officers in Australia were appointed in New South Wales in July 1915 with Lilian May Armfield (1884–1971) and Maude Marion Rhodes (–1956).

On 1 December 1915, Kate Cocks (1875–1954) was appointed the first of two woman police constables, with Annie Ross, in South Australia, a position that had equal powers to male officers.

In Western Australia, discussions of female police officers were held in October 1915 but remained unfunded. Helen Blanche Dugdale (1876–1952) and Laura Ethel Chipper (1879–1978) were appointed in August 1917 to commence duties on 1 September 1917 as the first two female officers.

October 1917 saw Madge Connor appointed as a 'police agent' of the Victoria Police, and in 1924 became one of four to be appointed as a police officer. Also in October 1917, Kate Campbell of Launceston was appointed to the Tasmania Police.

Queensland Police Department's first female police officers, Ellen O'Donnell and Zara Dare (1886–1965), were inducted in March 1931 to assist in inquiries involving female suspects and prisoners. They were not granted uniform, police powers of arrest, nor superannuation.

The Federal Capital Territory Police appointed their first of two female officers on 18 April 1947, to be in plain clothes, and had powers as a probation officer. The Northern Territory Police Force was accepting female officers by 1960, as long as they were unmarried, and aged between 25 and 35.

In June 1971, the first female promotion to superintendent was believed to be Miss Ethel Scott of the Western Australia Police. In April 1980, Australia's first female police motorcyclist was believed to be Constable Kate Vanderlaan of the Northern Territory Police Force who rode a Honda 750 cc police special around Darwin. NSW Police graduated a self-identified First Nations female officer in September 1982 given to be the State's first First Nations female officer.

Australia's and Victoria's first female commissioner was Christine Nixon (1953–) in April 2001, to February 2009. Katarina Carroll (1963–) became the twentieth and first female commissioner of the Queensland Police Service, in 2019.

=== Austria ===
Women have played an important role in enforcement since the early 1990s in Austria. On 1 September 2017, Michaela Kardeis became the first female chief of federal Austrian police, which includes all police units in the country and a staff of 29,000 police officers.

=== Canada ===
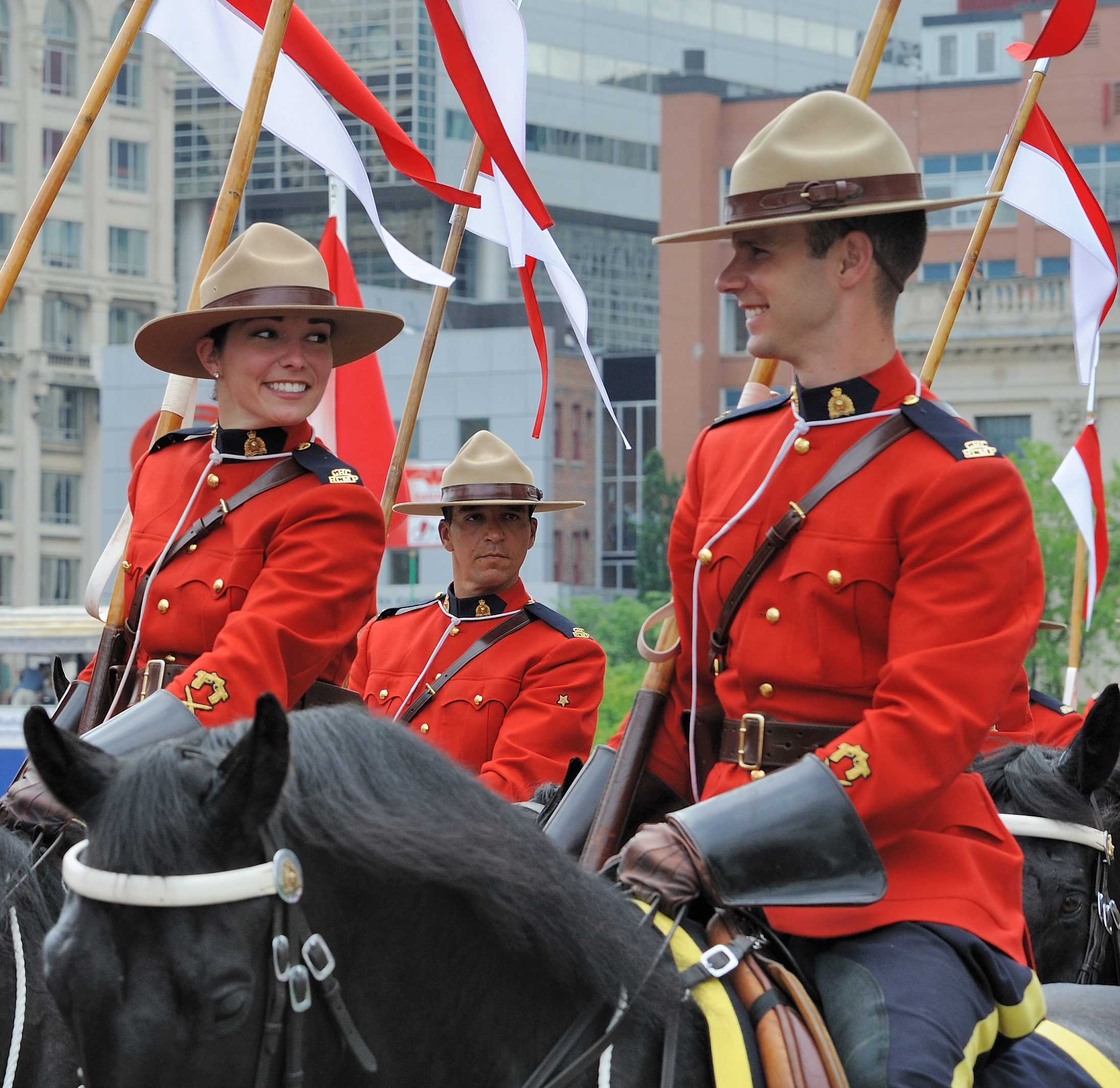
RCMP Riders

==== RCMP Training ====
The RCMP Depot Division is the only location for future RCMP cadets to complete their training held in Regina, Saskatchewan. The 26-week training of constables, conducted at the RCMP Academy, does not differentiate between men and women. The troop consists of 32 men and women who are required to follow their 26-week training together as a cadre. Other municipal and provincial police services have their own similar training programs without gender disparity.

===== Firsts =====
- Rose Fortune was the first Canadian female to act in the capacity of a police officer. She was also a businesswoman who had been born into slavery and was relocated at age 10 to Annapolis Royal, Nova Scotia, as part of the Black Loyalist migration. In the early 19th century Rose Fortune began setting curfews at the wharves and the surrounding area, which appointed her as the first Canadian unofficial policewoman, known for her ability to keep unruly youngsters in order. She was on familiar terms with the leading citizens of the town.
- Katherine Ryan (aka Klondike Kate) was hired February 5, 1900, at the Whitehorse Detachment in the Northwest Territories was kept as a matron to deal with female offenders and also be part of an escort team when female prisoners were moved from one place to another. She was the first woman hired in the RCMP, and was a special constable.

On September 16, 1974, thirty-two women were sworn in with the Royal Canadian Mounted Police as their first female officers. All thirty-two were sworn in simultaneously across Canada as a gesture to ensure the pressure of being the first female RCMP officer was not transferred to one woman but for the group to uphold as a whole.

In 1994, Lenna Bradburn became the police chief of the service in Guelph, Ontario, becoming Canada's first female chief of police. Christine Silverberg became Calgary's first female Chief of Police in 1995. In 2006, Beverly Busson became the first female commissioner of the RCMP on an interim basis. In 2016, female officers make up 21% of all police officers in Canada. In 2018, Brenda Lucki becomes the first female RCMP commissioner on a permanent basis.

=== Germany ===
In Germany, women were employed in the police force from 1903, when Henriette Arendt was employed as a policewoman.

=== Japan ===
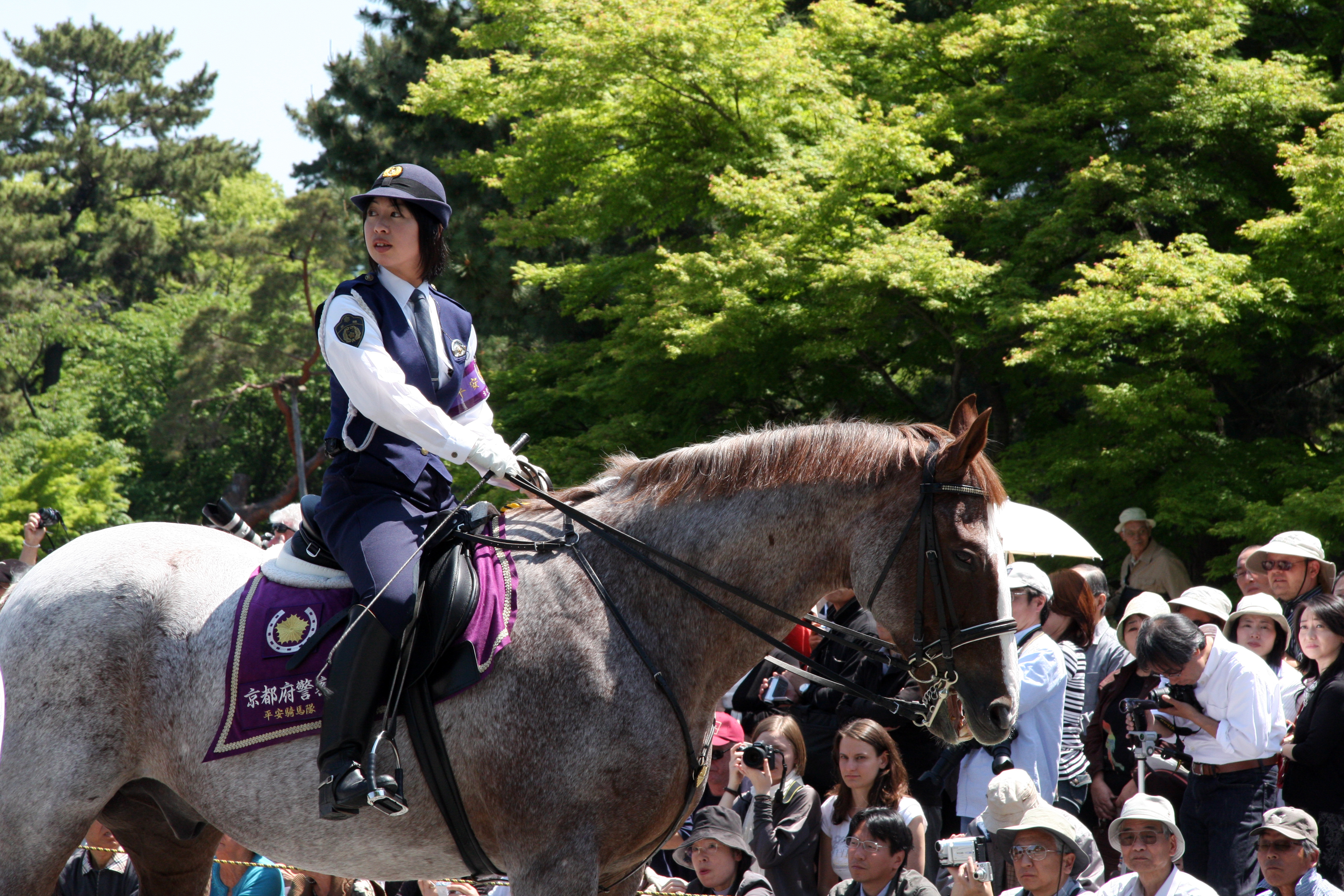
A female mounted police in Kyoto, Japan

The first 65 policewomen were employed in Japan on 27 April 1946. 27 April is therefore known as "Policewomen's Day" (婦人警官の日) in Japan. Policewomen in Japan were once called "婦人警察官" or "婦警" but switched to "女性警察官" in the wake of gender equality. In April 2026, 12.8% of police officers in Japan were women. This was an increase from 8.9% in 2017. Policewomen were deployed to Kōban in 2010. Skirts were once the uniform for policewomen in Japan, but were abolished in 2025 and are now only used for ceremonial purposes.

=== The Netherlands ===
In 1920, the Dutch police force specifically called for women to be employed in the new police office dealing with children and sex crimes within the Amsterdam police force. Initially, this office employed nurses, but in 1923, Meta Kehrer became the first woman Inspector of the Dutch police force, and in 1943, she also became the first woman to be appointed chief inspector.

In 2021, 42 percent of the Dutch police force were women.

=== New Zealand ===
Examined by at least 1936, the New Zealand Police did not admit women as police officers until 1941. They were not provided uniform, but had a lapel pin for their coats. By 1992, less than 10 per cent of officers were female.

=== Malaysia ===
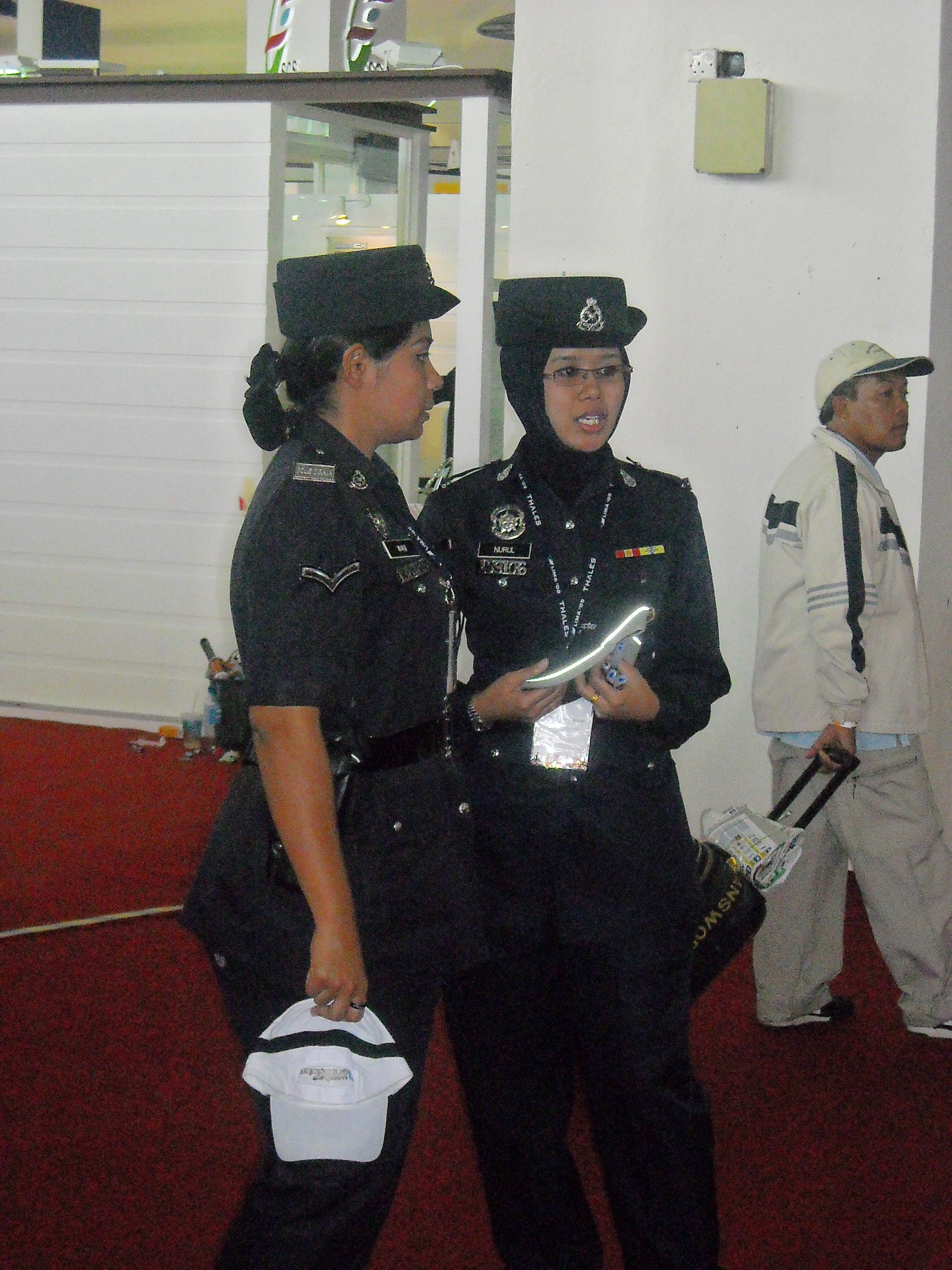
Malaysia female airport police, Langkawi Airport

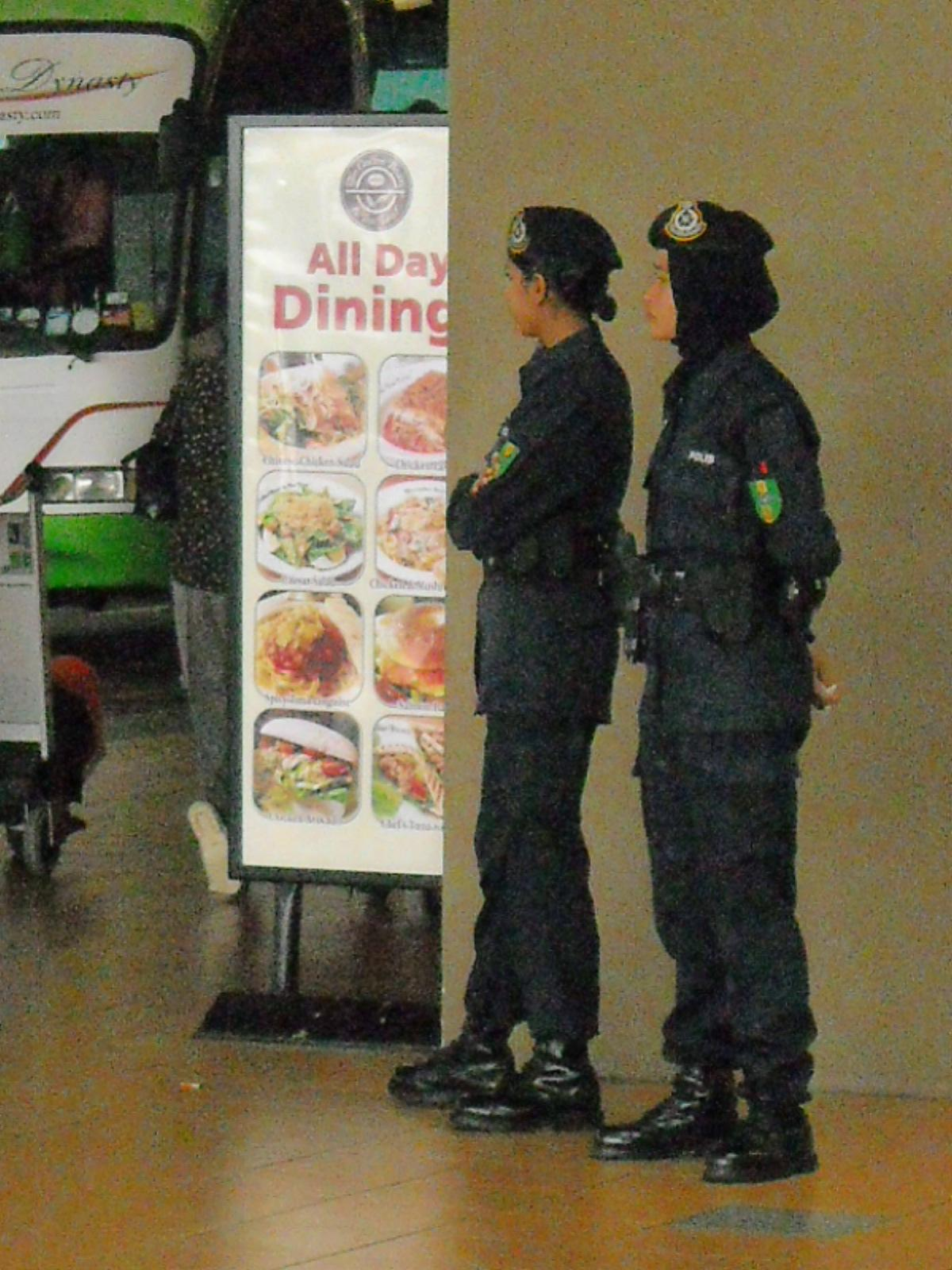
Malaysia female airport police, KL international airport

Women are able to serve in the police and military in Malaysia. Malaysia is a Muslim majority country and many female personnel wear some sort of headscarf.

=== Poland ===
In 1923, under the influence of concern expressed by the League of Nations about the increase in prostitution, crime among minors and crimes related to human trafficking, the Polish State Police began to consider establishing a separate women's section. Such a solution was advocated by, among others, the Polish Committee for Fighting Trafficking in Women and Children. Initially, the Central Bureau for International Fighting of Trafficking in Women and Children in the Republic of Poland, operating within Department II of the Ministry of Internal Affairs, was established, headed by a veteran of the Voluntary Legion of Women, Lieutenant Stanisława Paleolog.

Finally, on February 26, 1925, the Commander-in-Chief of the State Police signed a decree allowing women to work in the State Police. After training, the first 30 policewomen were admitted and by 1930 their number had increased to 50. Candidates could only be maids or childless widows between 25 and 45 years old, in good health, at least 164 cm (5 ft 4 1/2 in) tall and with short hair. Moreover, they had to provide a certificate of morality, an opinion about themselves issued by one of the women's organizations, and an assurance that they would not get married for 10 years after being accepted to the service.

Most of the policewomen from the first recruitment were sent to the Warsaw Sanitary and Social Brigade. The practice soon showed that policewomen were often more effective than their male colleagues in street scuffles, working with minors, or in interventions concerning domestic violence and sexual crimes. Policewomen also cooperated well with social organizations that dealt with human trafficking and pimping, such as the so-called station missions, women's protection societies or Catholic women's orders.

In August 1935, an independent Referat for Officers and Private Women was created at Department IV of the National Police Headquarters, headed by Assistant Commissioner Stanisława Paleolog. At that time a special 9-month course for female privates was created, the graduates of which were sent as constables to prevention or investigation units. Women's Police units operated in Warsaw, Vilnius, Kraków, Lviv and Łódź. Apart from separate women's units, policewomen were also assigned to criminal brigades or juvenile detention rooms in Poznań, Gdynia, Kalisz, Lublin and Stanisławów. By the end of 1936, another 112 women were taken into service, and in the following years a few dozen more were recruited each year. In total, until the outbreak of World War II, courses at the Warsaw School for State Police Officers were completed by about 300 policewomen.

During the September campaign, most of the female police shared the fate of their colleagues from local police stations. Stanisława Paleologna herself, promoted to the rank of commissioner in 1939, separated from the evacuation transport of the National Police Headquarters and, together with part of the policewomen's training company, took part in the battles of General Franciszek Kleeberg's Independent Operational Group "Polesie". During the occupation, as part of the State Security Corps, Paleolog trained future female cadres for the post-war Polish police. After the war she remained in exile in Great Britain, where she cooperated with Scotland Yard, and in 1952, she published the first monograph of the Polish women's police entitled "The women police of Poland (1925-1939)".

According to data from February 2012, women made up 13456 out of 97834 police officers, and 17495 women work in the police as civilian staff.

=== Sweden ===
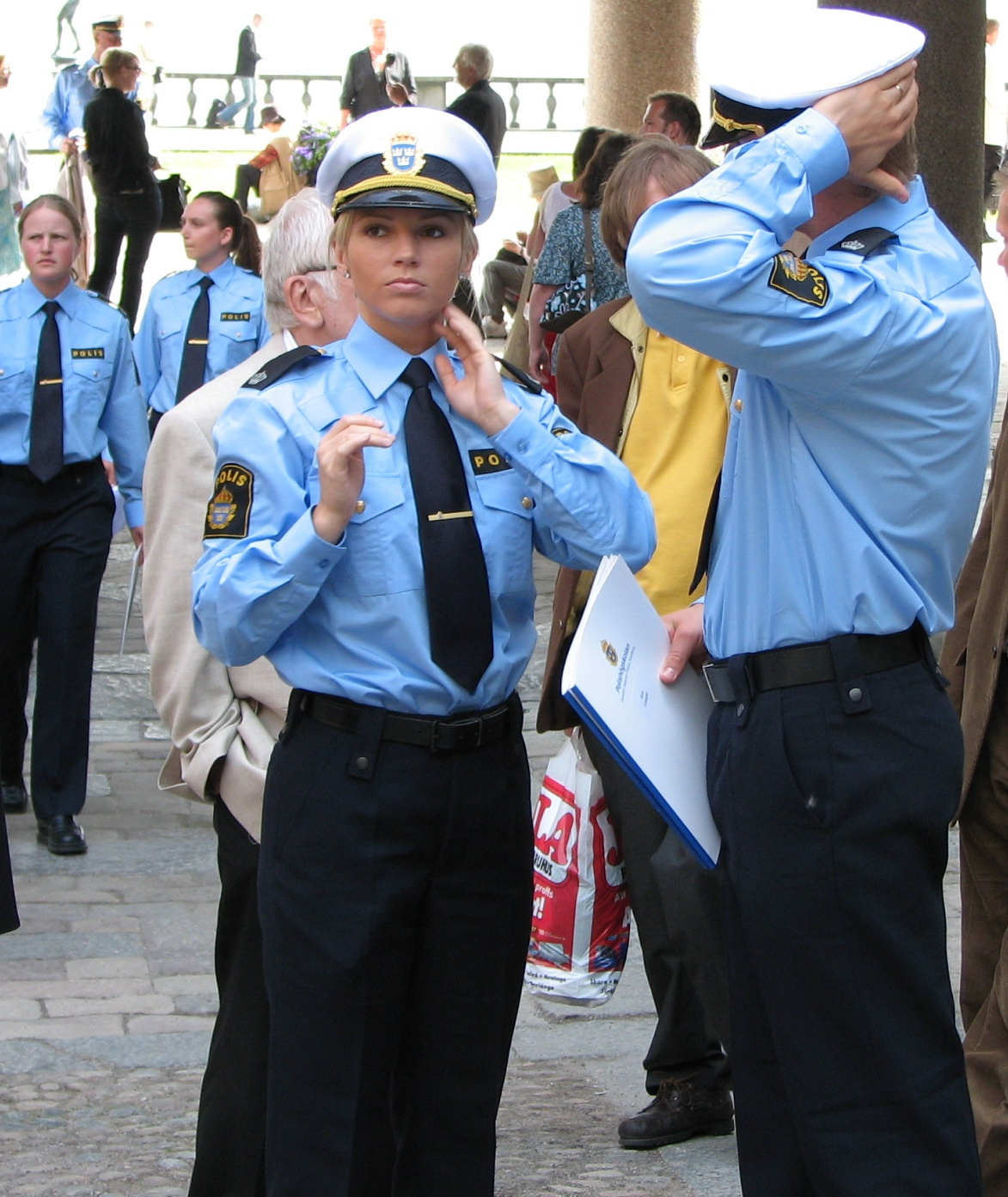
A Swedish policewoman with her male counterpart

In 1908, the first three women, Agda Hallin, Maria Andersson and Erica Ström, were employed in the Swedish Police Authority in Stockholm upon the request of the Swedish National Council of Women, who referred to the example of Germany. Their trial period was deemed successful and from 1910 onward, policewomen were employed in other Swedish cities. However, they did not have the same rights as their male colleagues: their title were Polissyster ('Police Sister'), and their tasks concerned women and children, such as taking care of children brought under custody, performing body searches on women, and other similar tasks which were considered unsuitable for male police officers.

The introduction of Competence Law in 1923, which formally guaranteed women all positions in society, was not applicable in the police force because of the two exceptions included in the law which excluded women from the office of priest in the state church - as well as from the military, which was interpreted to include all public professions in which women could use the monopoly on violence.

In 1930, the Polissyster were given extended rights and were allowed to be present at houses searches in women's homes, conduct interrogations of females related to sexual crimes, and do patrol reconnaissance. In 1944, the first formal police course for women opened; in 1954, the title "police sister" was dropped and police officers could be both men and women. From 1957, women received equal police education to that of their male colleagues. In 2019, 33 per cent of Sweden's police officers were women.

=== Taiwan ===
The first policewomen were hired in December 1947 by the Nationalist government, which was trying to reduce tensions between the government and the people and supplement the local police force at the time. However, few female police officers were recruited at the time, and the employment of policewomen stagnated until 1969. The Central Police University started recruiting female police officers in 1973.

In 2003, Hsieh Fen-fen (謝芬芬) was appointed to the commissioner of Yilan Police Department, making her as the first female police commissioner in Taiwan. In 2024, 13.74% of police officers in Taiwan were women. This was an increase from 12.32% in 2020.

Policewomen in Taiwan are strongly affected by the masculine culture of the Taiwanese police. The police were once considered a job for men in Taiwan. A modern wave of introducing policewomen started in 1997, when the Executive Yuan established the Foundation of Women's Rights Promotion and Development and raised concerns about crimes against women and children. Liu suggested that three factors promote the government's demand for policewomen: the increase in female criminals, changing ideas among policymakers, and efforts of feminists in Taiwan.

=== United Kingdom ===
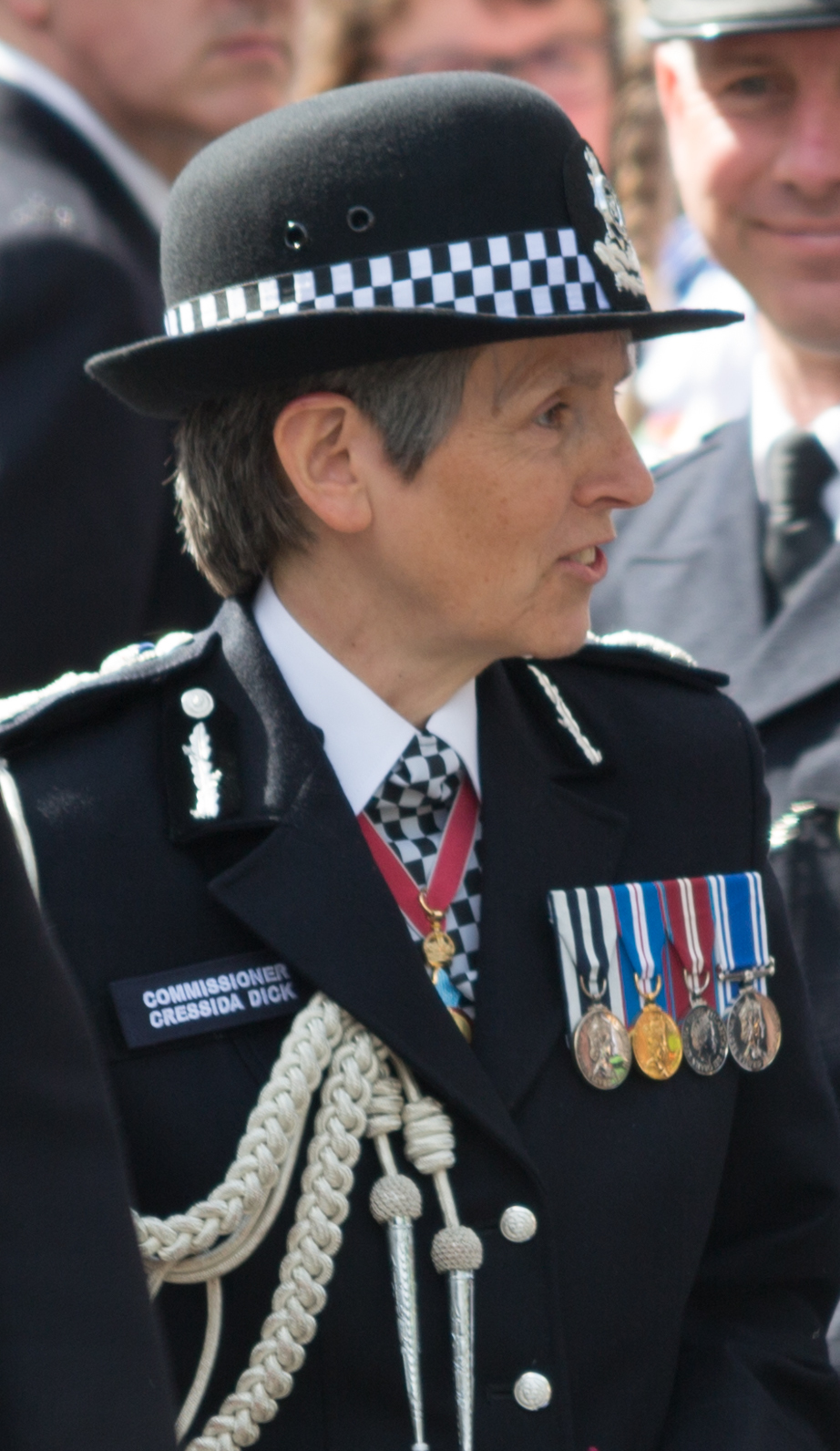
Cressida Dick, former Commissioner of the Metropolitan Police Service in London.

World War I provided an impetus for the first appointment of female officers. The first woman to be appointed a police officer with full powers of arrest was Edith Smith (1876–1923), who was sworn in to Grantham Borough Police in August 1915. A small number were appointed in the ensuing years. Policewomen would originally be in separate teams or divisions from their male colleagues, such as the A4 division in the Metropolitan Police. Their duties were different, with the early policewomen being limited to dealing with women and children. This separation ended in the 1970s.

Until 1998, women in the police had their rank prefixed with a letter W (for example, "WPC" for Constable).

In March 2016, 28.6% of police officers in England and Wales were women. This was an increase from 23.3% in 2007. Notable women in the police include Cressida Dick, the former Commissioner of London's Metropolitan Police Service.

=== United States ===
The first policewomen in the United States included Marie Owens, who joined the Chicago Police department in 1891; Lola Baldwin, who was sworn in by the city of Portland in 1908; Fanny Bixby, also sworn into office in 1908 by the city of Long Beach, California; and Alice Stebbins Wells, who was initiated into the Los Angeles Police Department in 1910. The first unofficial U.S. Secret Service female special agent was Florence Bolan. She joined the service in 1917. In 1924, Bolan was promoted to operative (the title preceding special agent) where she performed duties, such as searching female prisoners and engage in occasional fieldwork. In 1943, Frances Glessner Lee was appointed captain in the New Hampshire State Police, becoming the first woman police captain in the United States.

Since then, women have made progress in the world of law enforcement. The percentage of women rose from 7.6% in 1987, to 12% in 2007 across the United States. By 2023, women made up 28% of all law enforcement in the United States. However, as with most nations, women law enforcement employees have a much higher representation among civilian positions (59.9%) and among officer positions (13.8%).

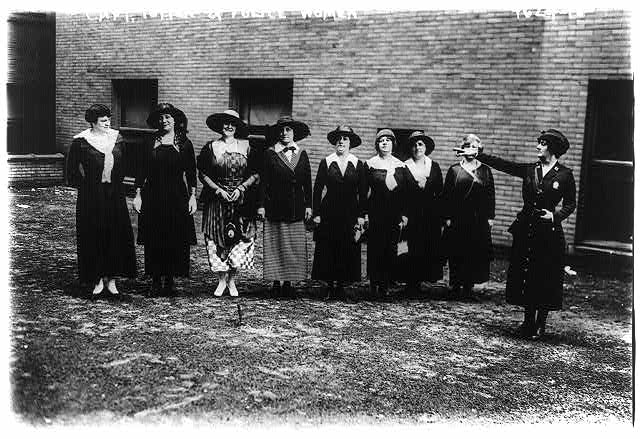
Capt Edyth Totten and women police in 1918 in New York

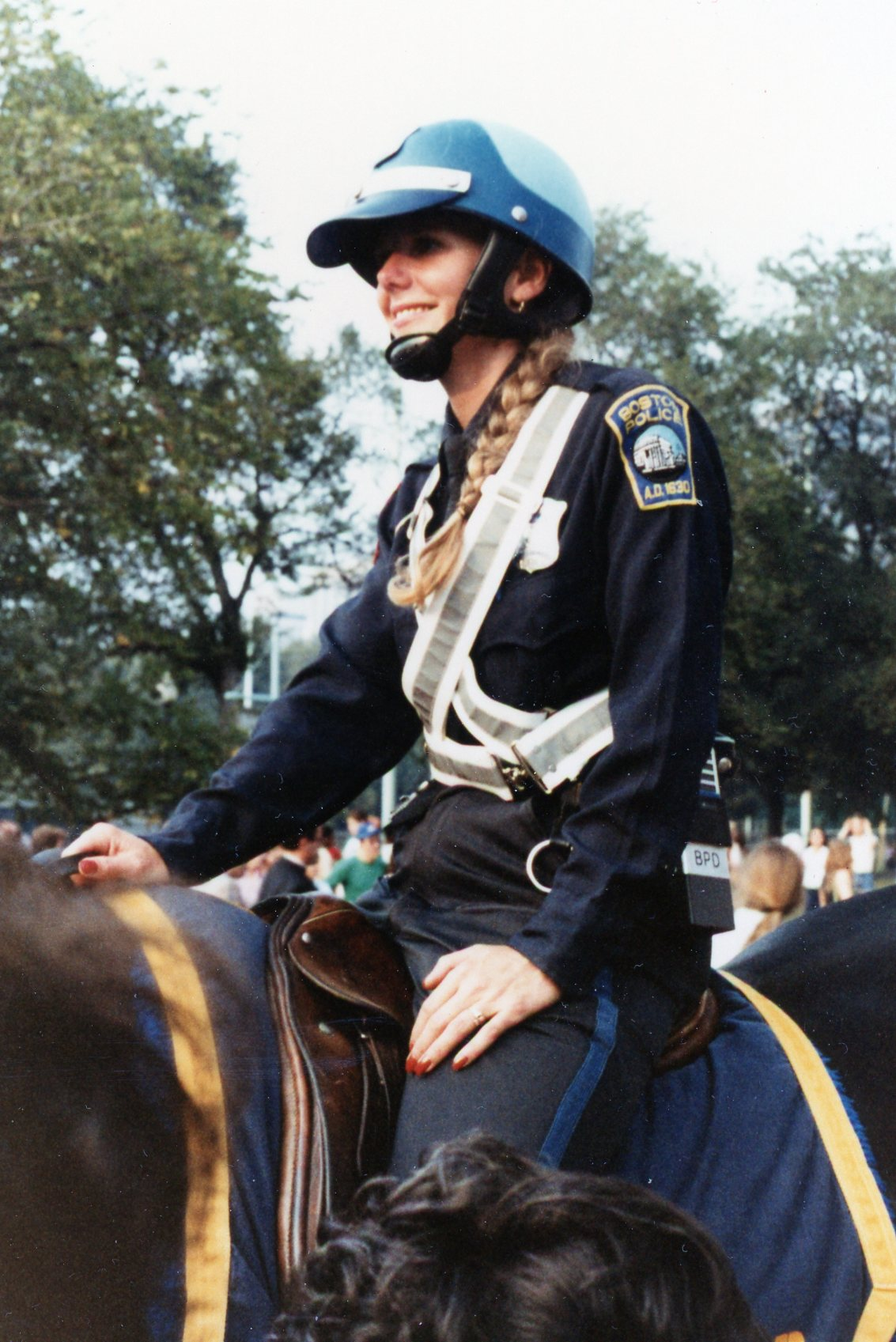
Mounted policewoman in Boston in 1980

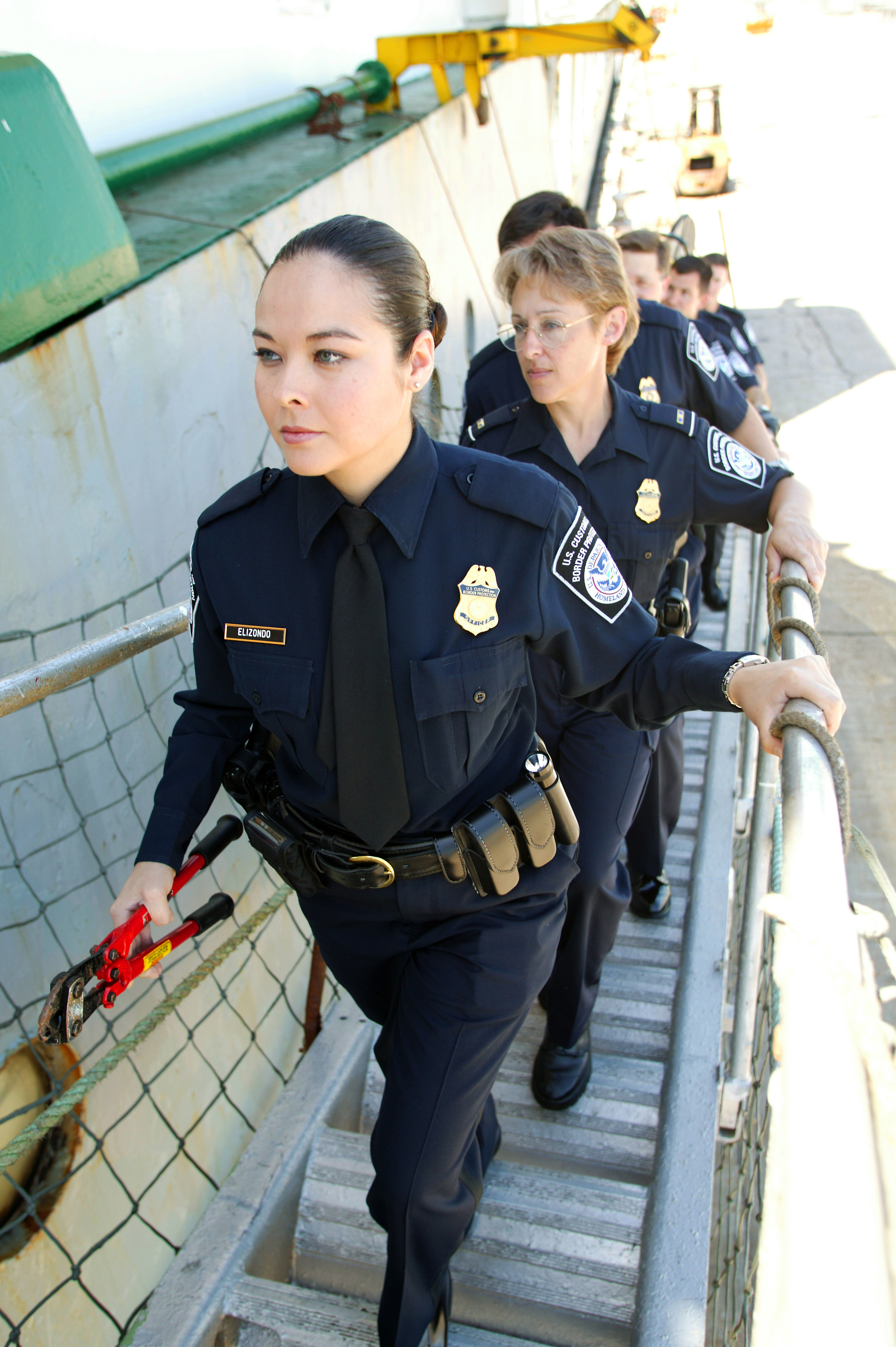
Customs officers in the US and Canada

== Discrimination ==
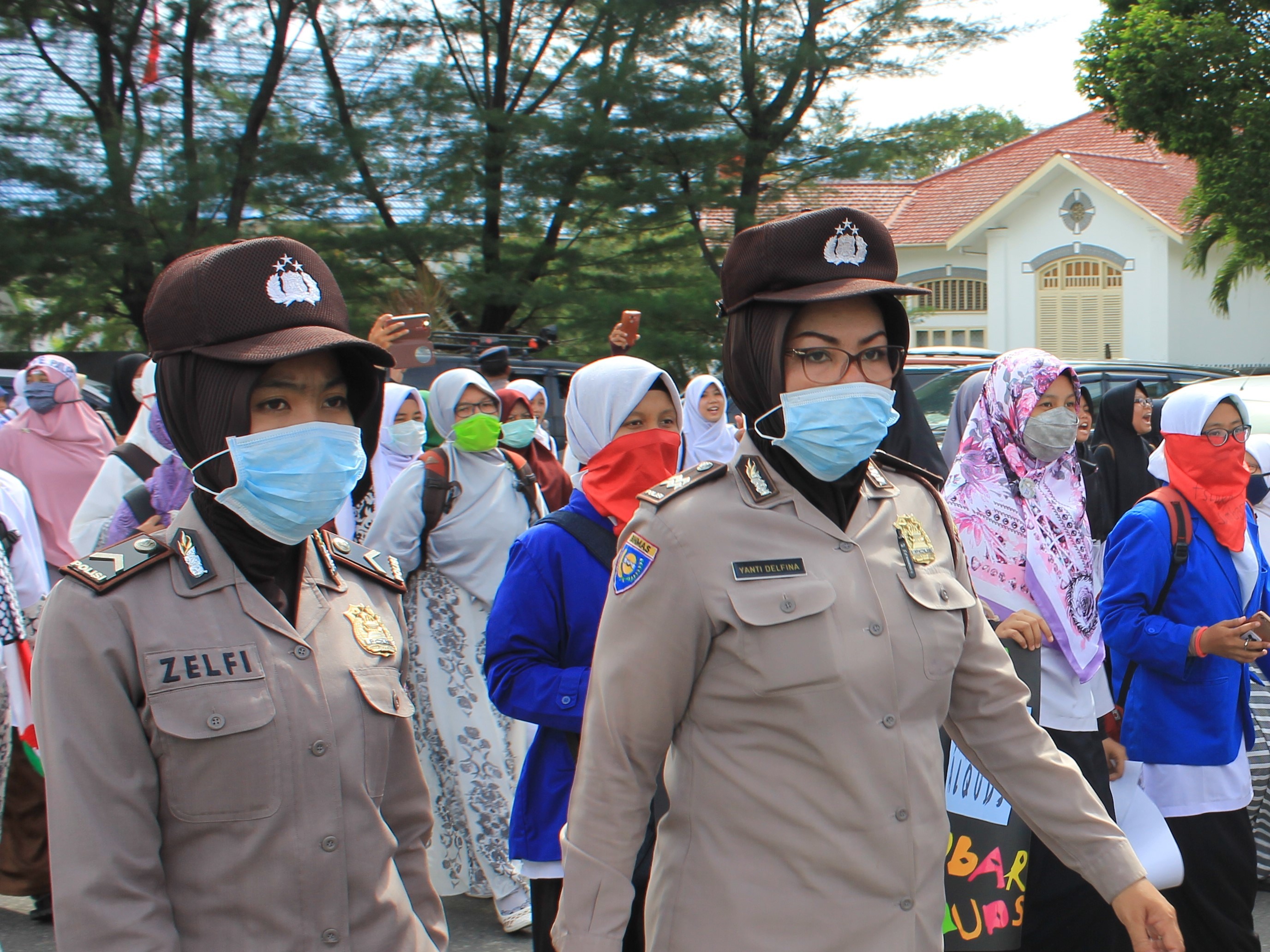
Police women in Indonesia.

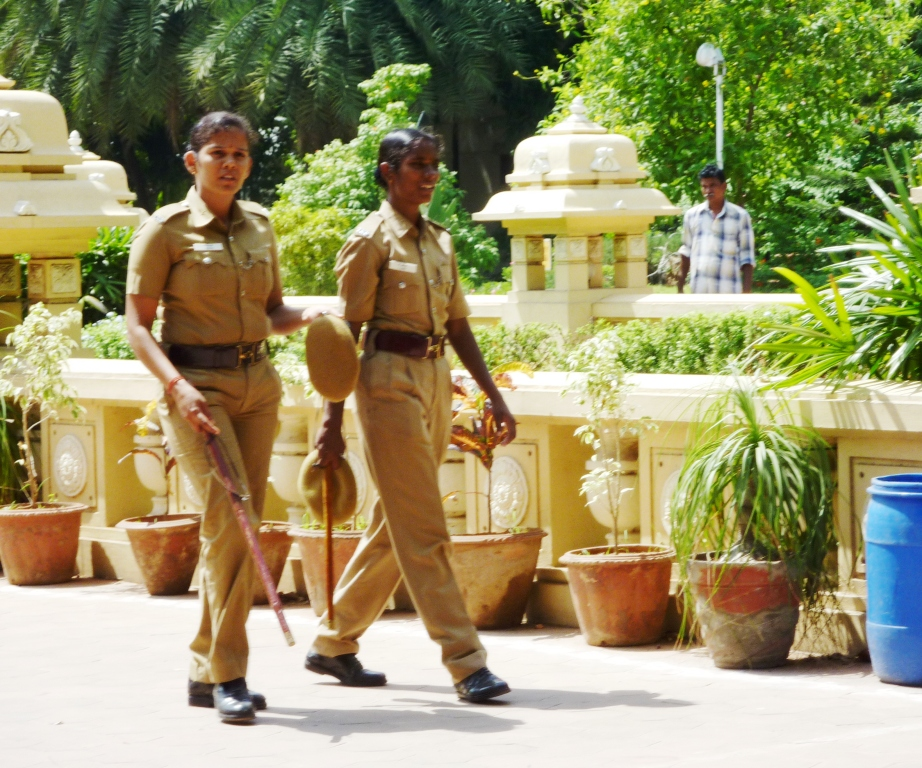
Police women in Chennai, India in 2010

Women members of Somaliland police force in the country's 32th Anniversary parade

Despite women being in law enforcement for over one hundred years, they are still faced with discrimination and harassment. Policewomen often face discrimination from their fellow officers and many women encounter the "glass ceiling", meaning they are not able to move up in rank and can only advance as far as the imposed ceiling will allow. Women tend to overlook and minimize the discrimination they face. Discrimination and problems towards women in law enforcement are not limited to the station house. Many policewomen who are married to other officers face a higher risk of domestic violence. A 2007 study stated 27,000-36,000 female police officers may be a victim of domestic violence. Domestic violence increases to nearly 40%, from a normal societal level of 30%, in households of officers.

While women are not as likely to be physically assaulted while on the job, they do face more sexual harassment, most of which comes from fellow officers. In 2009, 77% of policewomen from thirty-five different counties have reported sexual harassment for their colleagues. Women are asked to “go behind the station house” or are told other inappropriate things while on the job. Not only that, but there is often physical sexual harassment that takes place in the station house. So it is not only verbal, but also physical sexual harassment that policewomen face on a daily basis. Policewomen also experience greater mobility, frequently being moved from one assignment to another. As of 1973, 45% of policewomen and 71% of policemen remained in their regular uniforms, 31% of policewomen and 12% of policemen were given inside assignments, and 12% of policewomen and 4% of policemen had other street assignments. Policewomen are less likely to be promoted within the department (going from officer to sergeant, sergeant to lieutenant, etc.) and are also more likely to be given different assignments and are less likely to keep the same beat (patrol position).

Gender inequality plays a major role in the law enforcement field. Women in law enforcement are often resented by their male counterparts and many face harassment (Crooke). Many do not try to strive for higher positions because they may fear abuse by male coworkers, while few women receive the guidance they need to overcome these obstacles. Many women may feel they need to prove themselves to be accepted.

One preconception of female officers is they are more capable in communicating with citizens because they come off as more disarming and can talk their way through difficult situations. A study indicated that due to female officers' perseverance and unique abilities, they are becoming a fundamental part of contemporary policing. Women are found to response more effectively to incidents of violence against women, which make up approximately half of the calls to police. Research also indicates that women are less likely to use excessive force or pull their weapon.

=== Race ===
Multiple studies have shown that black women in particular suffer from a matrix of domination and discrimination as they negotiate the politics of institutional racism, affirmative action, and tokenism. As the section above notes, there is no single “female experience” of the policing profession. Collins (1990) and Martin (1994) argue that race gives black female police officers a distinct feminist consciousness of their experiences. These experiences are colored by stereotypes attributed to black women as “hot mamas,” “welfare queens,” and “mammies.” These caricatures are contrasted by perceptions of white women as “pure,” “submissive,” and “domestic.” While both sets of stereotypes are problematic, those attributed to black women lead to more suspicion and hostility in the workplace. Black women report receiving less protection and respect from their male colleagues. For many, black female officers lack the “pedestal” of femininity enjoyed by white women in the profession. In a study done by the College of Police and Security Studies, some 29% of white female officers acknowledged that black women in law enforcement have a harder time than white women. Discrimination among female police officers also seems to be prevalent even though black police officers, both male and female, make up only 12% of all local departments. There is also the issue of women being excluded from special units, with at least 29% of the white women and 42% of the black women mentioning this phenomenon.

Susan E. Martin (1994) conducted a study in Chicago interviewing both male and female command staff and officers on their perceptions of discrimination in the workplace. The results of this study showed that in general, women experienced more discrimination than men. Experiences differed within races as well, with black women reporting higher rates of discrimination than black men.

=== Sexuality ===
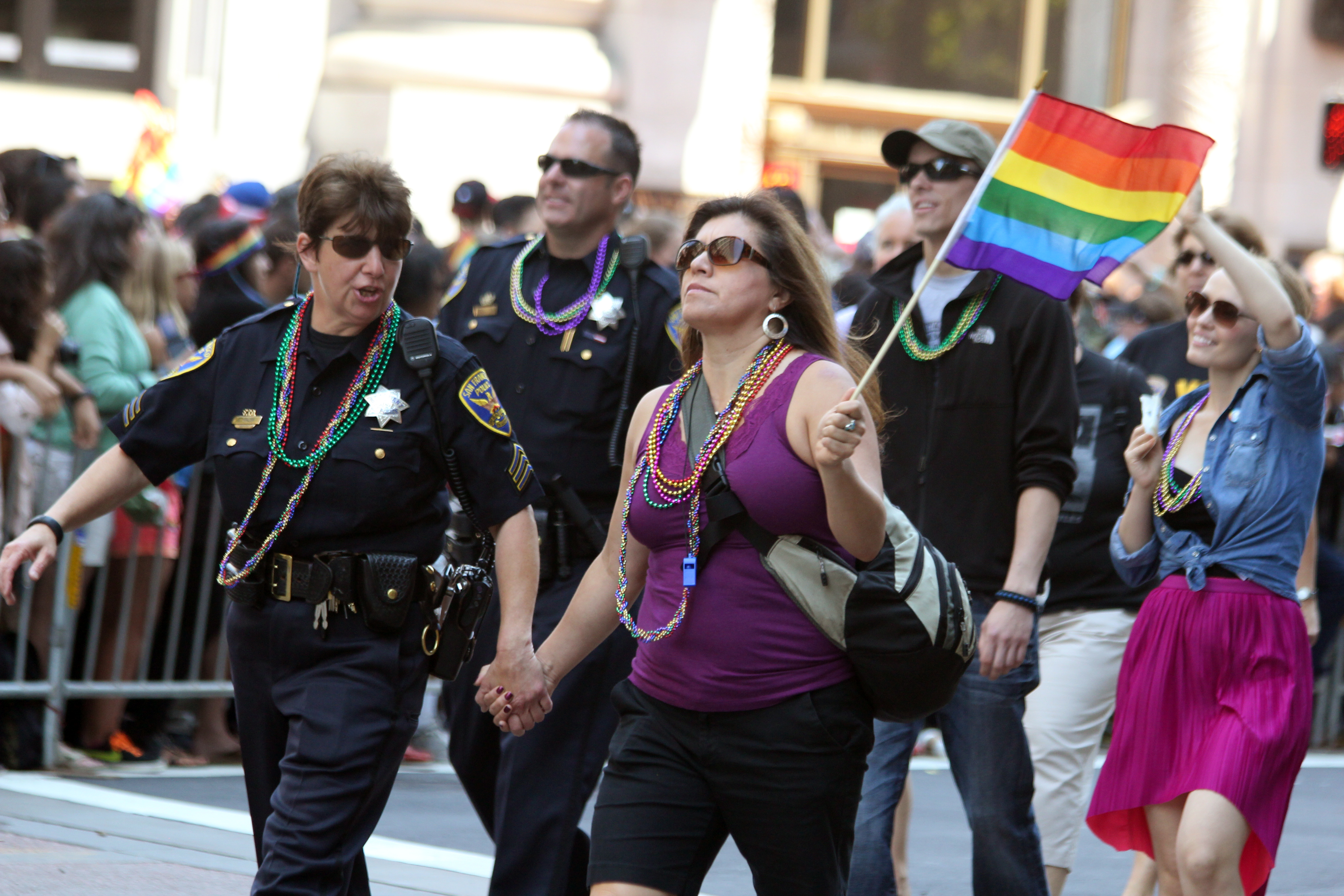
Female police supporting LGBT pride parade in California

The sexual orientation of a police officer can also influence the experiences of that officer. Women with non-heterosexual orientations deal with an additional set of stereotypes, exclusion, and harassment. Galvin-White and O'Neil (2015) examined how lesbian police officers negotiate their identities and relationships in the workplace. As they note, lesbian police officers must negotiate an identity that is "invisible" in that it is not necessarily detected by sight. Therefore, it is largely up to the individual to decide whether or not they come out to her colleagues. Many decide not to come out due to the stigmas surrounding LGBT identities, which may manifest themselves through discriminatory hiring processes and promotions. Galvin-White and O'Neil demonstrate that the decision to come out varies by individual and across the profession. The most salient factor influencing an individual's decision to come out is the extent of homophobia in the work environment.

Just as women are discriminated against in the police force for not fulfilling the traditional male traits of a police officer, so are members of the LGBT community for challenging traditional gender norms. While there have been recent efforts to recruit gay and lesbian police officers to boost diversity in the profession, the stigmas and challenges facing these officers remain. Research shows that lesbian officers who have come out are often excluded by both their male and female colleagues for not conforming to traditional femininity. Many of the studies Galvin-White and O'Neil cite report that lesbian police officers are often not able to trust their colleagues for backup or protection.

== See also ==
- Women in the military
