= Madge Connor =

Female police officer

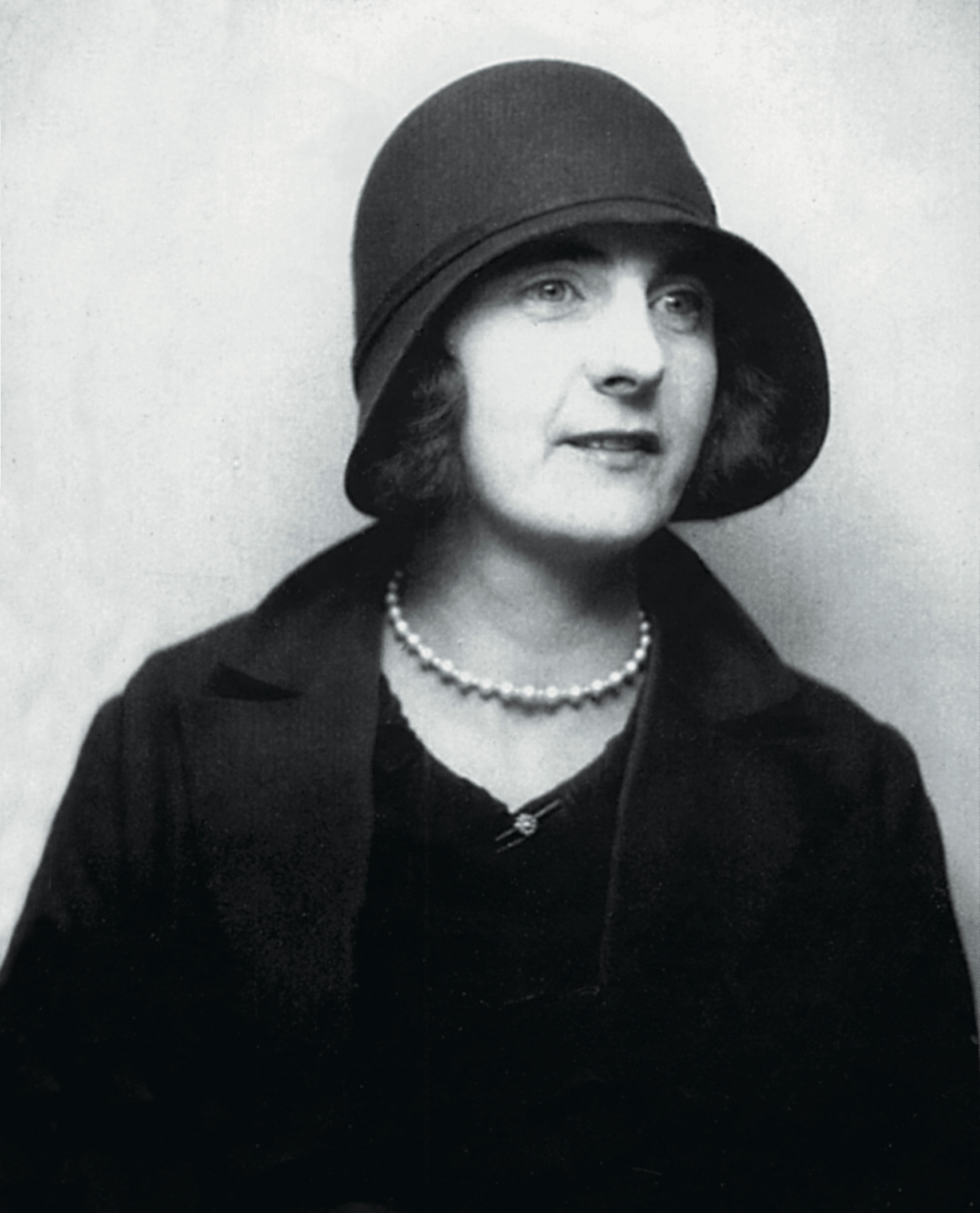
- Madge Connor (circa 1899)
- Born: Madge Irene McCarthy; 1874; Waterford, Ireland
- Died: 12 October 1952; Fitzroy, Victoria, Australia
- Resting place: Boroondara General Cemetery
- Other name: Madge O'Connor
- Occupation: Police officer
- Years active: 1917–1929
- Employer: Victoria Police
- Known for: First female police officer in Victoria

Madge Irene Connor (c. 1874 – 12 October 1952) was an Irish-born Australian police officer, who was the first woman to become a member of Victoria Police, and the first policewoman in Victoria, when she was appointed as a police agent in October 1917.

== Early life ==
Connor was born in Waterford, Ireland around 1874 (although numerous versions of her name and date of birth exist, the Australian Dictionary of Biography says she was "possibly" born on 14 November 1874). Her father, John McCarthy, was a mariner, and Connor stated that after he was lost at sea when she was aged 2, she lived with family in England, then emigrated to the United States, and later to New Zealand. At the age of 16, she met and married Edward Connor (O'Connor), an English-born labourer, with the couple eloping to Melbourne, Australia.

== Police career ==
Connor's husband Edward died suddenly in 1916, and Connor came to the attention of Victoria Police when his death was registered. Later that year, she began working for the police force, investigating illegal gambling and residing undercover in a boarding house to gather evidence against a notorious criminal. In 1917, after a campaign by women's groups to appoint women as police members, Connor was the first of two women to be appointed 'police agents', essentially a type of special constable with half the salary and no powers of arrest, uniform or weapon.

Connor led a group of female agents and watch-house matrons, and advocated for the appointment of women to Victoria Police, which occurred on 12 November 1924 when she and three other female police agents were officially sworn in as police officers, with equal pay and arrest powers.

Due to a quirk of police regulations, Connor lost her senior status in the force and was considered a junior officer. She was forced to retire on 14 November 1929, and was ineligible for a police pension as she had not served the requisite fifteen years as a sworn officer, so she utilised her detective skills as a private investigator.

Connor died on 12 October 1952 at St Vincent's Hospital, Melbourne, and was buried at Boroondara General Cemetery in Kew. In August 2017, Victorian Police Minister Lisa Neville and Chief Commissioner Graham Ashton unveiled a plaque at the cemetery commemorating her role as a pioneer of women in policing, and in November that year, a statue of Connor was unveiled at the Victoria Police Academy. She was posthumously inducted onto the Victorian Honour Roll of Women in 2019.

== See also ==
- Lillian May Armfield (1884–1971), one of the first two female NSW police officers (July 1915)
- Kate Cocks (1875–1954), first two South Australian female police officers (December 1915)
- Zara Dare (1886–1965), one of the first two female Queensland police officers (March 1931)
- Women in law enforcement
