= Royal Melbourne Hospital =

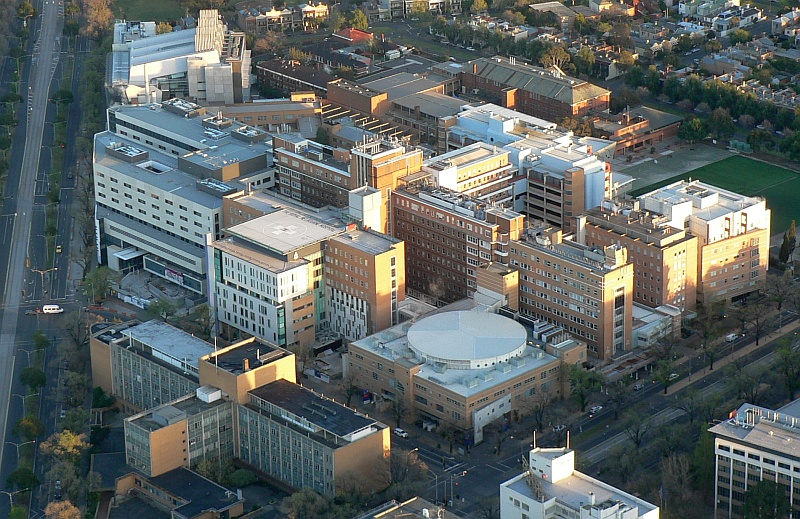
- Aerial view of the Royal Melbourne Hospital (centre) with the old Royal Dental Hospital in foreground

Geography
- Location: Parkville, Melbourne, Australia
- Coordinates: 37°47′56″S 144°57′22″E

Organisation
- Care system: Public
- Type: General
- Affiliated university: University of Melbourne

Services
- Emergency department: Yes
- Beds: 571

Helipads
- Helipad: (ICAO: YRMH)
Number	Length		Surface
Number	ft	m	Surface
1			aluminium

History
- Founded: March 15, 1848

Links
- Website: www.thermh.org.au
- Lists: Hospitals in Australia

The Royal Melbourne Hospital (RMH) is one of Australia's leading public tertiary hospitals. Located in Parkville, an inner city suburb of Melbourne, Victoria, it is a major teaching hospital for tertiary healthcare with a reputation in clinical research.

The hospital is administered as part of Melbourne Health, alongside the Inner West Area Mental Health Service (IWAMHS), as well as the North West Dialysis Service.

Professor Shelley Dolan was appointed Chief Executive of the hospital in August 2023, succeeding Professor Christine Kilpatrick AO.

== History ==
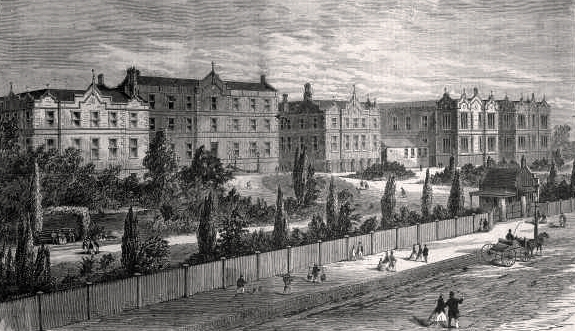
1868 wood engraving of the Melbourne Hospital in its original location.

Established in 1848 as the Melbourne Hospital, it was one of Melbourne's leading hospitals. Originally located on the corner of Swanston and Lonsdale Streets, Melbourne. Completely rebuilt on a much larger scale between 1910–1916 extending to Russell and Little Lonsdale Streets. In 1935 the hospital was renamed the Royal Melbourne Hospital and, in 1944, it moved to Grattan Street, Parkville by provision of lands in the Royal Melbourne Hospital Act. The old buildings then became home to a relocated Queen Victoria Hospital.

The Royal Women's Hospital was previously located in Carlton. The hospital moved in late 2008 to a new building, the new Royal Women's Hospital, co-located on the Royal Melbourne Hospital site in Parkville.

=== World War II ===
During World War II, the Parkville hospital, which was under construction, was occupied by the United States Army 4th General Hospital between 1942 and 1944. While the hospital was under construction a temporary tent hospital was set up by the US Army in Royal Park just north of the hospital. Upon completion of the Parkville hospital the patients were moved progressively into the new accommodation which catered for 2,900 beds.

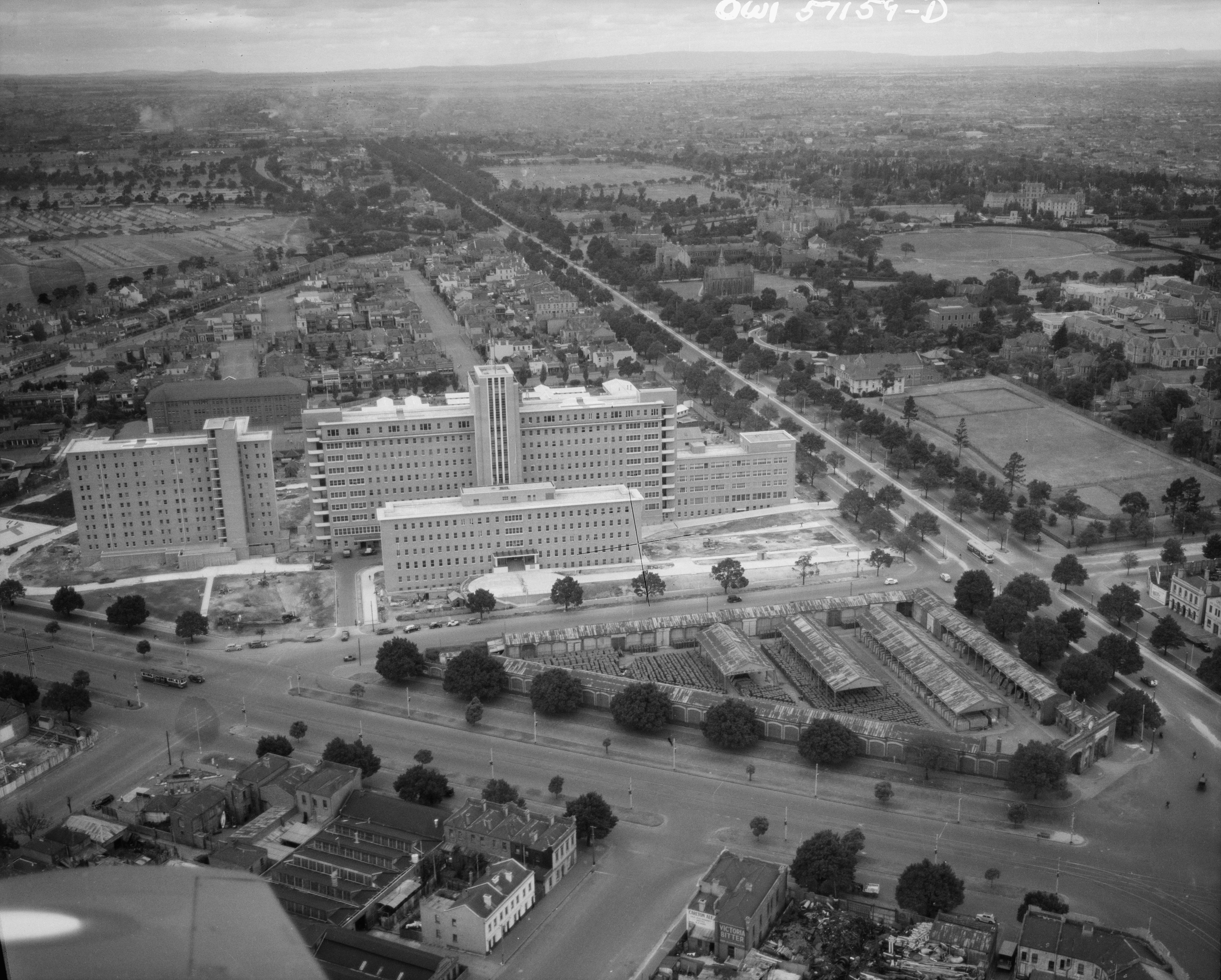
Royal Melbourne Hospital in 1943

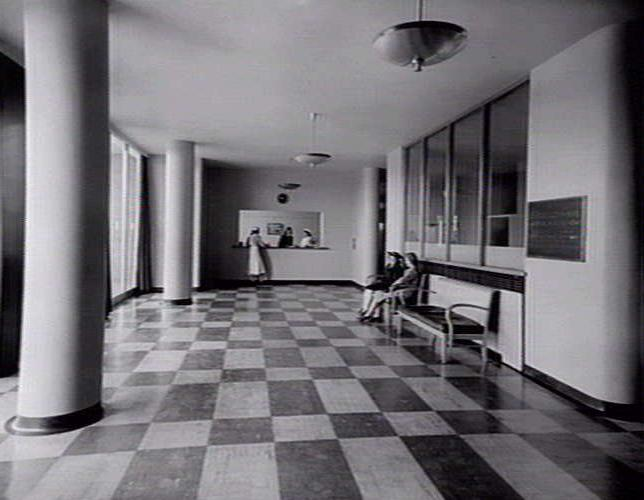
Then-modern interior of Parkville's Royal Melbourne Hospital in 1945.

The Royal Melbourne Hospital continued to operate from their old premises on the corner of Lonsdale and Swanston Streets until the 4th General Hospital moved to Finschhaven in New Guinea in 1944. The Parkville buildings were reconditioned and the Royal Melbourne Hospital finally moved into their "new" premises in December 1944.

== Services and specialties provided ==
The Royal Melbourne Hospital provides acute tertiary referral services at its main site on Grattan Street between Flemington Road and Royal Parade and ancillary services such as aged care, rehabilitation, ambulatory care and residential and community services through its Royal Park site.

It has one of the largest Emergency Departments in Victoria and is, with the Alfred Hospital, one of Victoria's two major trauma referral centres. The emergency facilities include: 2 trauma bays, 6 resuscitation cubicles, 25 general cubical beds and 17 short-stay beds. There is also a helipad on top of the hospital so that urgent cases that need to be airlifted from regional areas can be transferred to the Royal Melbourne.

Most medical and surgical specialties are available at the Royal Melbourne Hospital. It is one of very few public hospitals in the Australasia that routinely performs robotic surgery. In addition, the Victoria Infectious Diseases Service (VIDS) is based in the hospital, as is the John Cade Psychiatry Ward and the headquarters of the North Western Mental Health service.

=== Medical specialties ===
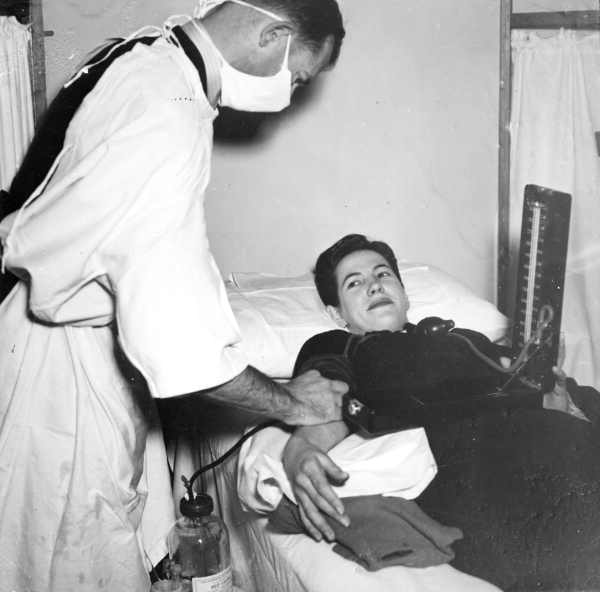
Blood donation at the Royal Melbourne Hospital during the 1940s.

- General medicine: Ward 5 South-West and 5 South-East
- Respiratory medicine: Ward 5 South-West
- Gastroenterology: Ward 5 North
- Cardiology/coronary care unit: CCU 2B
- Endocrinology: 6 South-West
- Allergy & Clinical Immunology
- Rheumatology
- Dermatology
- Renal medicine: 6 West and 6 South-West
- Neurology: 8B
- Acute stroke service: ward 8B
- Haematology and bone marrow transplant: Ward 7B
- VIDS/infectious diseases: 9 East
- Intensive care unit: 6B
- Palliative care: 7 West

=== Surgical specialties ===
- General surgery: 3 South West, 3 South
- Colorectal surgery: 3 South West, 3 South
- Hepato-biliary and pancreatic surgery: 3 South West
- Transplant surgery
- Trauma: 7 South East, 7 South West
- Cardiothoracic surgery: 6 South-East
- Urology: 9 West
- Oral and maxillofacial surgery: 7 South East
- Vascular surgery: 9 West
- Plastic surgery: 7 South East
- Orthopaedics: 7 South West
- Neurosurgery: 4 South
- Ophthalmology: 9 West

=== Mental health services ===
- Department of Psychiatry: 1 North
- Psychiatric Ward: John Cade Building
- North Western Mental Health
- Inner West Mental Health Service

=== Miscellaneous ===
- Radiology
- Pathology
- Emergency department

In addition, the Royal Melbourne Hospital has an Enhanced Crisis Assessment & Treatment Team & Triage Service (ECATT) team on call 24 hours a day to assess patients in the Emergency Department.

== Postgraduate training, the clinical school and nursing education ==
The clinical school at Royal Melbourne Hospital is one of the clinical schools of the University of Melbourne School of Medicine (the others being based at the St Vincent's Hospital, the Austin Hospital, Shepparton Regional Hospital, Northern Hospital, Western Hospital, Ballarat Hospital, Bendigo Hospital, and Northeast Health Wangaratta).

The hospital offers postgraduate educational activities, including weekly professorial case discussion meeting, grand round, daily morning registrars teaching round, intern training sessions, advanced life support forums, and other individual department-based educational sessions.

The new residents' quarter is located on the 8th floor.

The Royal Melbourne Nursing Education Department provides continuing professional education opportunities for nurses. It offers programs for undergraduates, graduate nurses and postgraduate students as well as short courses, staff development and mandatory resuscitation training. It also offers some online training modules.

The programs focus on recruitment and retention of nurses.

== Fellowship positions ==
In addition to post graduate training, largely aimed at Australian trainees, the Royal Melbourne Hospital also offers clinical and research fellowship positions, most of which are open to both Australian and international candidates.

Fellowships available include:

- Colorectal surgery (including advanced minimally invasive surgery)
- Urology (including robotic surgery)
- Diagnostic and interventional radiology
- Arthroplasty and pelvic trauma surgery

== Research and other medical and academic collaborations ==
The hospital undertakes clinical research in oncology, neurosciences, infectious diseases, diabetes, colorectal cancer and mental health.

In addition, there are close ties with:

- The Walter and Eliza Hall Institute of Medical Research (WEHI)
- Cancer Trials Australia
- The Howard Florey Institute at the University of Melbourne
- Mental Health Research Institute of Victoria
- National Ageing Research Institute
- Ludwig Institute for Cancer Research
- the Peter Doherty Institute for Infection and Immunity

== Notable personnel ==
- Russell Basser (born 1960) – oncologist, Olympic water polo player
- Jean Evelyn Headberry – Dean of Royal Melbourne and Associated Hospital's School of Nursing

== See also ==
- List of hospitals
- List of hospitals in Australia
