= 4th General Hospital (United States Army) =

The 4th General Hospital was a US Army medical unit during World War II.

The unit was drawn mostly from medical personnel from Cleveland, Ohio from University Hospitals and the Medical School of Case Western Reserve University.

After formation and assembling in New York, a convoy with the 4th General Hospital team on board, left New York on 23 January 1942 with an escort of US destroyers to an undisclosed destination.

The medical unit disembarked in Melbourne, Australia on 27 February 1942. The medical unit set up a temporary tent camp in Royal Park, Melbourne. The new Royal Melbourne Hospital building which had been made available under lend-lease reciprocal contributions arrangements was still under construction.

On 12 May 1942 the medical unit finally moved into the Royal Melbourne Hospital building, becoming the only time an entire Australian hospital has been occupied by another country. The unit admitted more than 35,000 patients during its two-year stay in Australia. Mrs Jean MacArthur and son Arthur MacArthur IV were admitted for observation after their escape from the Philippines.

The 4th General Hospital relocated to Finschhaven in 1944 after landing at Port Moresby in New Guinea. A 2,000-bed hospital was constructed at Finschhaven. During its stay at Finschhaven the 63rd Station Hospital and 126th Station Hospital were absorbed into the unit. Approximately 11,200 patients were treated while the unit was in Finschhaven.

On 23 July 1945, the hospital at Finschhaven was closed and the unit moved to Manila. Upon arriving in Manila the Imperial Japanese had surrendered so the unit was demobilized in Manila.
