= Lillian May Armfield =

Australian police officer (1884–1971)

Lillian Armfield
- Born: Lillian May Armfield; 3 December 1884; Mittagong, Colony of New South Wales
- Died: 26 August 1971 (aged 86); Lewisham Hospital
- Occupations: nurse; policewoman
- Years active: 1 July 1915–2 December 1949
- Known for: One of the first women police detectives in Sydney, Member of the New South Wales Police Force

Lillian May Armfield ISM KPFSM (3 December 1884 – 26 August 1971) was an Australian nurse and pioneering Sydney female police detective, one of the first women to serve in that role.

== Early life ==
Lillian May Armfield was born in Mittagong, New South Wales, on 3 December 1884 to George Armfield and Elizabeth Armfield (née Wright). Her first job in 1907 was as a nurse at the Callan Park Hospital for the Insane in Callan Park, Sydney. She left that role for a pioneering position as a female police detective in the New South Wales Police Force on 1 July 1915. When recruited as probationary special constable, she was 5 ft 7¾ ins (172 cm) tall, weighed 12 st. 10 lbs. (81 kg), and had light brown eyes, brown hair and a fair complexion. She was described by her interviewing-officer as 'very intelligent, tactful, shrewd, capable ... Character undoubtedly good and a very suitable candidate'. She was appointed along with Maude Marion Rhodes (–1956).

== Police career: 1915–1949 ==
For over thirty years, Armfield then served as a female police detective, mainly working in the localities of Surry Hills and Darlinghurst. At first a probationary special constable, Armfield was not provided with a uniform, or paid for overtime and ancillary expenses as her male colleagues were. Unlike her male colleagues, she also experienced discrimination in terms of recompense for injuries sustained in the line of duty and had no superannuation benefit rights at the end of her career.

She was a nemesis of female underworld ringleaders like Tilly Devine and Kate Leigh, associated with the razor gang violence of the 1920s, and also served as a social worker, warning younger women of bullet wound injuries or razor slashing from associating with male criminals. She was a contemporary of legendary Sydney police officers Ray 'the blizzard' Blissett and Frank Farrell.

Despite her valour and dedication, Lillian Armfield was not given adequate recognition during her career as a police professional. She was only slowly promoted, becoming a Special Sergeant (Third Class) in 1923, and Special Sergeant (First Class) in 1943. She was in charge of all N.S.W. Policewomen until her retirement. For most of her police career, it was known that she was the only N.S.W. Policewoman approved to carry a service revolver.

== Acclaim ==
In 1946, she received official acclaim for her life's work, receiving the King's Police and Fire Service Medal.

She was awarded the Imperial Service Medal in 1949, when she retired from the police service aged sixty five.

Her life story, Rugged Angel - The Amazing Career of Policewoman Lillian Armfield, was published in 1961 and became a best-seller. It was written by Vince Kelly, a noted Sydney journalist.

In 2001, Armfield was inducted onto the Victorian Honour Roll of Women.

In August 2011 the series Underbelly: Razor included a storyline depicting Armfield. This part was played by Lucy Wigmore.

== Death ==
Lillian Armfield lived her final years at a Methodist Hostel in Leichhardt, Sydney. She died at the Lewisham District Hospital on 26 August 1971, aged 86.

Although she was never married and had few relatives, many old colleagues and friends attended her funeral at the Northern Suburbs Crematorium which included a police guard of honour.

== See also ==
- Kate Cocks (1875–1954), first two South Australian female police officers (December 1915)
- Zara Dare (1886–1965), one of the first two female Queensland police officers (March 1931)
- Madge Connor (1874–1952), first Victoria Police female 'police agent' (October 1917)
- Women in law enforcement
- Tilly Devine – Sydney razor gang ringleader in Sydney during the thirties.
- Kate Leigh – Sydney razor gang ringleader in Sydney during the thirties.
- Frank Farrell – Newtown Rugby league player and police detective – a colleague of Lillian Armfield.
- Razor gangs – historical context of the Sydney 'razor gang' conflicts of the twenties and thirties.
- Underbelly: Razor – 13-part drama including a portrayal of Lillian May Armfield.
