= Zara Dare =

Australian police officer (1886–1965)

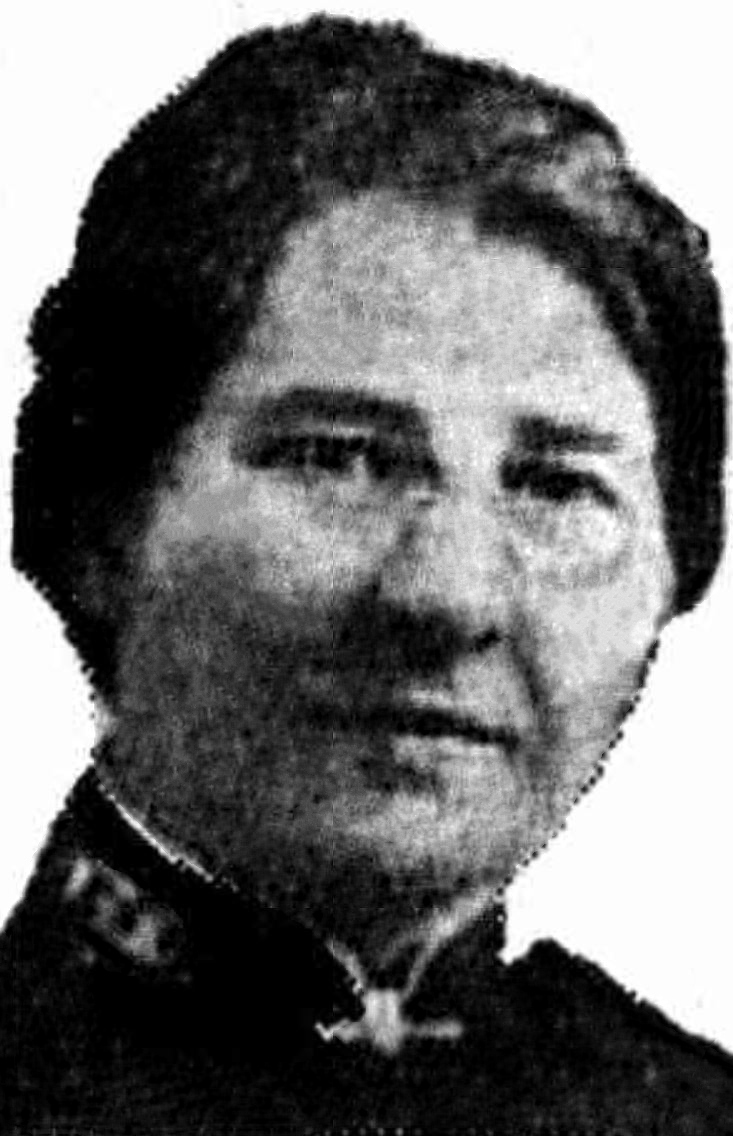
- Born: Zara Dare; 28 May 1886; Shoalhaven, New South Wales, Australia
- Died: 1 October 1965 (aged 79); Scarborough, Queensland, Australia
- Occupations: Missionary, temperance organiser, police officer
- Spouses: James Wilson (1879–1963)
- Children: 0
- Parent: James Dare (1854–1935); Evaline Sinclair (1861–1939)

Zara Dare (28 May 1886 – 1 October 1965) was one of the first two female police officers of the Queensland Police Department, assigned number '2WP', appointed on 16 March 1931, until her resignation in March 1940 to get married. Prior to being a police officer, she was a missionary to China with the Salvation Army.

== Early life ==
Zara's parents James Dare (1854–1935) and Evaline Sinclair (1861–1939) married in 1881. Evaline was one of fourteen children, and the sister of Hugh Sinclair (1864–1926), later a federal member of parliament (1906–1919).

One of twelve, the fourth child and second daughter Zara was born in 1886 in Shoalhaven, New South Wales.

After becoming one of the largest stud cattle breeders of New South Wales' South Coast, about 1904 the family moved to Talgai West, north-west of Warwick, Queensland, and later the Tweed district, NSW, for dairying and cattle. James Dare was also a noted show judge of dairy cattle, a strong adherent to the Salvation Army movement, a cricketer, philanthropist, and an expert marksman.

== Missionary work ==
Dare started identifying with The Salvation Army work in Lismore, New South Wales. After training in the service of the Salvation Army as a cadet in Melbourne, she spent four years as an officer in Sydney and Melbourne, to 1917. Her Sydney activities were mostly confined to slum work.

In February 1917, it was announced that with seven other Australians and four New Zealanders, Captain Dare would leave for China as a member of the Pioneer Missionary Contingent. Establishing the first Salvation Army corps in Beijing, the contingent members found a cold and bleak winter, an uninviting place of high walls, people everywhere and crowds, with a difficult language; then an almost unbearable heat of summer, which combined with continuous rain. Men in the streets would stare at these foreigners whose clothing collars bore the Chinese characters 'Jo Shur Jun' (救世軍; 'Save World Army').

Considering this as a 'great adventure which lasted 15 eventful years', Dare spent two years at a school at Beijing, before continuing to coastal Tianjin, 'pioneering the work of the Salvation Army' with an American, Finn, and two Chinese colleagues. The following three years were spent on an island within fresh water lakes, 100 miles (160 km) from Tianjin. (Note: The island in the fresh water lakes is likely to be Baiyang Lake, the largest freshwater lake in northern China; which is 65 miles (105 km) WSW of Tianjin.) With a population of about 30 000 people she converted a number of persons to be officers of the Salvation Army. Despite distinct hostility towards 'Christian propaganda', at their first Sunday meeting they made 44 converts. Observing their great devotion to parents, and unfailing politeness, the Chinese people had also suffered from a recent disastrous drought; she helped to feed up to 1000 persons per week from starvation. It was at this time she met 'Christian General' Feng Yuxiang.

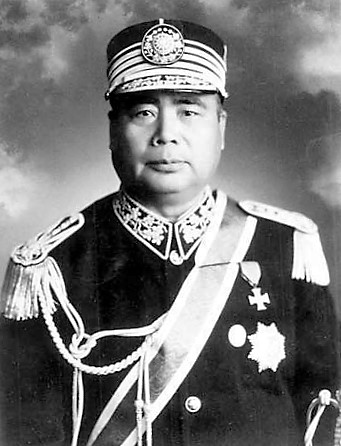
Warlord Feng Yuxiang (1882–1948)

Five months at Jen Chiu Hsien, a place 100 miles (160 km) from the nearest Westerner and with no English heard or spoken, Dare associated with being Chinese, eating the local food and thinking in Chinese. It was then onto Shijiazhuang in the same province, a town with a flourishing 'white slave trade' and the open sale of opium and many dens. Working with local police, she saw her role as rescuing children and women from the dens.

Ensign Dare returned to Queensland, Australia in November 1924 on furlough after service in northern China. During this time as Adjutant Dare, she undertook lantern lectures from Ipswich to Nambour. (Note: In the Salvation Army, a captain has a minimum of five years service; Dare had this title in 1917 when she left for China. One 1924 newspaper assigns her the rank of ensign, a more-senior rank that was discontinued in 1931. Another newspaper referred to her as an adjutant, a rank next senior to ensign, and awarded at ten years' service. The rank was discontinued in 1948.) She then returned around May 1925 to China, to Ping-Ti-Chuan, North West Frontier, 70 miles (110 km) miles north of Datong. The military base of General Feng Yuxiang of the National People's Army allowed her to conduct meetings among Feng's troops, speak upon a platform purpose-built for her, and had thousands of Chinese soldiers sing old Salvation Army hymns Dare had learned as a child in Shoalhaven. With Feng's army defeated by Zhang Zuolin, and retreating to Gansu Province, she followed. In Gansu she nursed the wounded at the military base hospital.

In 1928 the Southern Army took the area, and Dare was evacuated to Tianjin; six months later returning to Gansu with Salvation Army brigadier Frances Gillam. She found the Communists had taken all their belongings, and were conducting Communist meetings in their Kwei Yhua Salvation Army Hall. The cry 'Down with the foreigner' suggested they were unwelcome:

At four o'clock one afternoon, with the temperature at 10 degrees below zero, sitting in a room in our compound, we overheard a conversation in the room adjoining. We were interested to learn that the two "Christian foreigners" were, on the morrow, to be led through the streets at the head of a procession, and having been duly displayed would be taken to the outskirts of the town and beheaded as an example to all interfering women!

Gillam and Dare showed calmness, but that night sent a message to the provincial governor. A contingent of native police and troops surrounded the compound the next morning before escorting the pair to the railway station 3 miles (4.8 km) away, and waited until the train arrived five hours later.

(After meeting up in June 1931, in January 1932 Gillam was farewelled by Dare from Brisbane, as Gillam was returning to China to spend another six-year term. The Salvation Army withdrew from the mainland China in 1949, and did not return until 2017.)

== Temperance Union organiser ==
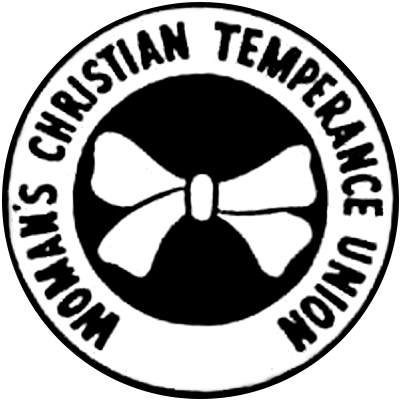
WCTU logo with a white ribbon bow, representing purity

By February 1930, with an ailing mother, and some homesickness, Dare returned to Australia to settle in Brisbane. She joined the Women's Christian Temperance Union (WCTU), whose headquarters was based at Willard House, River Road, North Quay, near the Brisbane River. (Note: The Australian organisation was called the Women's Christian Temperance Union, while the American one was 'Woman's'.) At one WCTU educational conference in April she and a Mrs Budgen were allotted the subject for a speech, 'Treatment of snake bite and shock'; On others, about her experiences in China. Dare by July 1930 had become their State organiser, which included travels through Queensland.

It was at the WCTU that she chanced upon an American poster stating 'Women police are wanted' – After some reflection, and corresponding to good timing with a government trial, a few months later she was appointed to the Queensland police. At the early-March 1931 State Executive meeting,

Mrs. Williams congratulated Miss Zara Dare on her appointment as a member of the women police and spoke of her ability to carry out the duties of the office. Nearly 40 years the W.C.T.U. had worked for this reform, and it was with gratification that the announcement of the appointment of Miss Dare was received. (Note: The WCTU meeting was prior to 4 March 1931 which hailed her appointment as a police officer; but her official appointment date was 16 March 1931. Her appointment was however known in the newspapers by late February 1931.)

Interviewed at the time, Dare indicated her friends advised her to apply, but the type of work always appealed to her as a way of helping girls and women 'where present organisations did not largely reach', given her connection with women's work over the years.

== Police career ==
=== Origins ===
First reference to the idea of women police was made by the National Council of Women of Queensland in 1911. Following an inquiry by the Acting Home Secretary, in 1915 the third Commissioner William Cahill (period 1905–1916) of the Queensland Police Department rejected the idea of employing women. This was the same year that South Australia led by appointing the first female police officer in the British Empire.

At a time when people were dealing with the effects of the Great Depression, it was the sixth Commissioner, William Ryan (period 1925–1934), who sanctioned the recruitment of the first two policewomen. The public was becoming aware through the newspapers of female officers in other jurisdictions including Scotland Yard and Barcelona and Poland; the annual meeting of one branch of the Queensland Women's Electoral League (QWEL) in July 1930 was emphasising the need to establish 'a force of women police in Queensland', especially as there were appointments in every other state of Australia. On 30 September 1930, Queensland's Premier Arthur Moore at the QWEL state annual general meeting announced as an experiment, 'several policewomen would be appointed as vacancies occurred in the general police force', to be trialled in Brisbane with two or three members, and a medical test similar to male applicants. Additional female officers might be appointed if the 'experiment' was successful. The Home Secretary required applicants to 'undergo severe medical and educational tests', cited their 'primary duty would be to shield girls and women from evil'. Sixty applicants applied for two positions, eight interviewed, and a comparatively few able to pass the required medical test.

=== Appointment ===
The Home Secretary and the Police Commissioner announced in late February 1931 of the intended appointments of Zara Dare of Brisbane and Ellen O'Donnell of Gympie. (Note: Ellen O'Donnell, born 16 December 1896, had Ellen as her birth name, but was also referred to as Eileen.) There was no dissenting voice in the cabinet meeting making the decision, after the Queensland Cabinet supported a submission by Irene Longman, Queensland's first female Member of the Queensland Legislative Assembly. By June 1931, organisational strength was noted as 1236 officers (2 of which were women police), 67 native trackers, and 26 recruits.

The president of the National Council of Women, representing 62 women's organisations,

expressed her gratification on the appointment of two policewomen, the appointments being especially pleasing to the members of women's organisations, whose endeavours had at last borne fruit. Mrs. Cumbrae-Stewart instanced the success of women police in the other States, Queensland being the last State to adopt the idea. There was no doubt that the appointments were fulfilling a long-felt want, and the resultant benefits would be inestimable. They should be of great value to women and children, a department in which their services were most needed. A policewoman naturally would be able to understand a child and the motives for which a woman committed any offence. The duties of the women police would, she hoped, include the taking of statements from women and children at police stations. They should be placed on the same status as a policeman, with the same opportunities for promotion, and should be enabled to perform without interruption all the duties that fall to the lot of a policeman. Mrs. Cumbrae-Stewart was of the opinion that the women police should be supplied with a uniform as in the other States, whereby they can be more easily recognised.

The Queensland Police Department's first two women police were appointed on Monday 16 March 1931. They were attached to the Roma Street police station in the centre of Brisbane but were not sworn in and had no powers of arrest. They did not have a uniform but were given a badge of authority. Their duties were to protect the interests of women and children, to assist in inquiries involving female suspects and prisoners. Actions required...

Railway stations would be visited, and females travelling alone would be protected from possible molestation. Wine saloons would be patrolled to prevent excessive drinking by women, and there would be regular street patrol work.

After their appointment both women were trained by plain clothes male officers, working various hours.

=== Career ===
When joining the department, Dare lived at Hill Street, Sherwood, before moving to Kate Street, Kedron.

After five years of service the presence of female officers was still little known within the Brisbane community, in part because they did not wear uniform. Whilst mentioned in the newspapers involved in cases of shoplifting (electric torches were quite popular; females generally stealing clothes and cosmetics; males stealing socks, ties, and silk stockings), they were also dealing with school truancy, an epidemic of juvenile crime and petty theft, and escorting prisoners to courts afar as Cherbourg and Charleville. Rostered hours were generally 9.00 am to 5.00 pm, and they would not always work as a pair. In one instance, O'Donnell posed as a wife during a fraud investigation.

In April 1936 one of the lesser incidents in Dare's career was almost getting run over by a driverless motor car outside the station.

During the years, she took her experience of rescuing children and women in China, to the police courts. Reflecting in 1940,

Every year police women in this city are responsible for bringing in hundreds of children from the streets who have been sent out to "lift" goods from the chain stores. We bring them in to the station, talk to them and take them home. We patrol the gardens and parks, the department stores and places of amusement. We try to be kind as well as just. Sometimes kindness is mistaken for weakness. I have taken many a 'hiding' in my time, but if I have helped to lift a few people to their feet, given them any sort of incentive to run straight, it has all been in a very good cause.

On Friday, 1 March 1940, Dare resigned from the police department, three months short of her 54th birthday, fifteen days short of nine years of service, to get married on the Monday, as married women were not allowed to serve in the police force.

=== Later developments ===
The seventh Commissioner Cec Carroll (period 1934–1949) advertised for a replacement female police officer. An applicant was to be:

- a woman, 30 to 32 years of age;
- preferably a shorthand-typist with experience as a confidential secretary to a business executive;
- have wide knowledge and understanding, deal intelligently with all cases; and
- not married, although could be a widow;

for a salary of £290 a year including allowances.

Elizabeth Rose Boyle commenced duty on 1 May 1940, also with Dare's number, '2WP'. A third female officer appointment, additional to O'Donnell and Johnstone, was also being considered in 1940. 3WP Alison Johnstone commenced on 17 February 1941, and 4WP Olive Wanmer on 20 March 1941. By 1945 numbers are increased to nine female officers for the Women Police Section due to the increased policing demands of WW2.

1WP Ellen O'Donnell was injured on duty in 1962, and died from related causes eight months later on 8 March 1963, after 31 years service, aged 67. O'Donnell is buried at the Nudgee Cemetery, with her sister Winifred (born 1887, died 12 June 1968), at site 5A-654. She never married. She was not eligible for pay allowances, or superannuation.

Only in March 1965 were Queensland's female police officers sworn in, and given entitlements already provided to male police officers; and pay equity did not occur until 1 September 1970 – almost four decades after Dare and O'Donnell started. Married women were allowed in the police force from 1971.

== Later years ==
Dare's parents on retirement moved to Pelican Street, North Ipswich. Father James died in 1935, aged 78. Mother Evaline died in 1939, aged 78. This may have relieved Dare of any caring responsibilities for her parents.

On Monday, 4 March 1940, Zara Dare married privately to 'a hard-headed Scotsman who has retired from business' before honeymooning in Stanthorpe. James Wilson of Montville, Queensland was one of nine children, seven years Dare's senior, and this was his second marriage.

Wilson first married in 1903 to Bertha Louisa Doretta Kreutzmann, until her death at 59 years of age, in September 1939. (Note: Incidentally Wilson's first wife Bertha Kreutzman had a brother, Otto, who was an acting-sergeant at the Roma Street police station, before retiring due to ill-health in July 1935. It is possible Dare had met and knew Kreutzman.) Wilson's marriage with Kreutzmann produced two sons and two daughters. He was one of the first commercial growers of avocados in the State. Their son, James Cockburn Wilson, together with later-Sir Frank Sharpe at Redland Bay, went on to develop the popular commercial 'Sharwil' cultivar in 1951.

After the Dare–Wilson wedding, the Wilsons moved to 'Cumnock', Mooloolaba, north of Brisbane by 1943, before moving to the Nambour area, and by 1958, retiring to 138 Turner Street, Scarborough, north of Brisbane. James Wilson died on Friday, 30 August 1963, aged 84, and was interred with his first wife at the Buderim cemetery, Mooloolaba Road, Buderim.

Dare died two years after her husband, on Friday, 1 October 1965, aged 79, at Scarborough, and was cremated. She is interred at the Mount Thompson Crematorium, columbarium 7, section 13, niche no. 195.

== See also ==
- Lillian May Armfield (1884–1971), one of the first two female NSW police officers (July 1915)
- Kate Cocks (1875–1954), one of first two South Australian female police officers (December 1915)
- Madge Connor (1874–1952), first Victoria Police female 'police agent' (October 1917)
- History of the Queensland Police
- Women in law enforcement
