= Jean Headberry =

Australian nurse (1911–1993)

Jean Evelyn Headberry
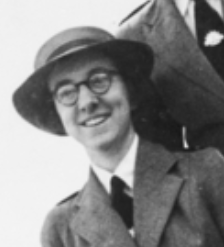
- Embarking for overseas service, c. Sep 1940
- Born: 15 October 1911
- Died: 1 January 1993 (aged 81)
- Occupations: Registered nurse and midwife
- Known for: Awarded the Florence Nightingale Medal in 1961

Jean Evelyn Headberry (15 October 1911 – 1 January 1993) was an Australian registered nurse and midwife who was awarded the Florence Nightingale Medal in 1961.

Headberry served as a nursing sister with the Australian Army Nursing Service in the Second World War, and was awarded a Centaur Memorial Scholarship in 1946 to study in England.

Headberry later became the Dean of Royal Melbourne and Associated Hospital's School of Nursing.

She died on 1 January 1993.
