= Kate Cocks =

Australian police officer (1875–1954)

Kate Cocks MBE JP
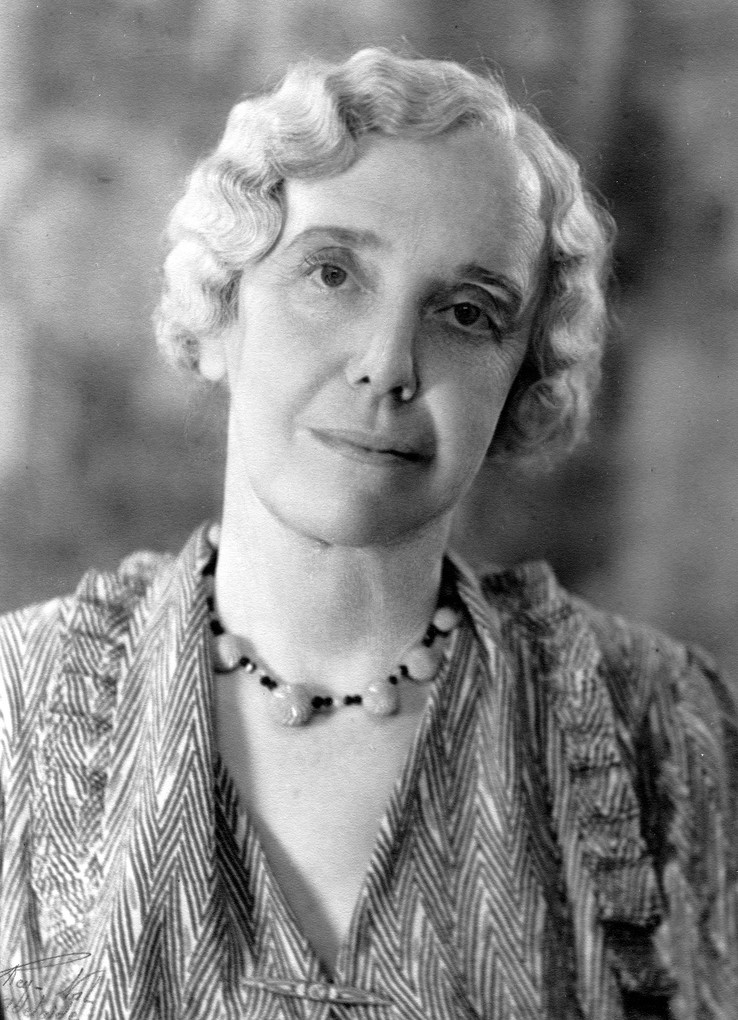
- Born: Fanny Kate Boadicea Cock; 5 May 1875; East Moonta, Colony of South Australia
- Died: 20 August 1954 (aged 79); North Adelaide, South Australia, Australia
- Occupations: Police officer and welfare worker
- Parent(s): Anthony Cock and Elizabeth Cock (nee George)

Fanny Kate Boadicea Cocks (née Cock; 5 May 1875 – 20 August 1954) was a welfare worker and one of two of the state's first female police officers in South Australia. She is best known for her work with unmarried mothers and babies. The Kate Cocks Memorial Babies Home was named in honour of her work.

== Early life and education ==
Kate Cocks was born Fanny Kate Boadicea Cock in Moonta, South Australia, on 5 May 1875. Her father Anthony was a miner, mine manager, and engineer, born in a mining district near Camborne, Cornwall, England. He emigrated to the Colony of South Australia and married Elizabeth George, a school teacher from Auburn.

Cocks was home tutored after the family moved to a farm near Quorn, further north in the state. She had two brothers, Frank and Wellesley (died 25 February 1931). At a time before 1900, the family's last name changed from Cock to Cocks.

== Professional life ==
In 1900, Cocks returned to the Yorke Peninsula area to teach at a school in Thomas Plains for a year. After this, Cocks moved to the suburbs of Adelaide to teach at the Edwardstown Industrial School (1898-1949) of Edwardstown, which had opened on the site of the former Girls Reformatory on Naldera Street, Edwardstown. Cocks served as schoolmistress and sub-matron there.

In 1903, Cocks joined the State Children's Council, which had been formed in 1886 as part of the Destitute Persons Amendment Act, 1886 as a clerk and in 1906 was appointed the state's first probation officer for juvenile first offenders.

After 13 years, in 1915, Cocks was transferred from the Children's Welfare Department to the South Australian Police Department, after an approach by then-Chief Secretary A. W. Styles. She was formally appointed on 12 November 1915, along with Miss Annie Ross, to commence on 1 December 1915 as South Australia's first woman police constables. Responsibilities included female offences around youth sexuality and alcoholism, prostitution, and solicitation.

Although reported in newspapers at the time as the first female officer in South Australia, Australia, the British Empire, and 'probably in the world', two officers had commenced duty in New South Wales five months earlier in July 1915.

In 1920 she was appointed 'principal police matron', and in 1924, 'Principal of the Women Police', supporting up twelve female officers by February 1932, the largest number in a force in Australia. By June 1934 when announcing her intention to retire, she had fourteen female officers, double that of the next nearest force of NSW. She was awarded five honourable mentions by the Commissioner. She retired in May 1935 to look after her mother.

After retirement in 1935, Kate Cocks worked with the Methodist Women's Home Mission Association to care for homeless girls, and she served as voluntary superintendent until 1951. In 1936 the Methodist Church purchased a home in the Brighton area to serve as a care facility for unmarried mothers and their newborn babies, and Cocks moved to the area in 1937 act as superintendent.

== The Kate Cocks Memorial Babies' Home ==
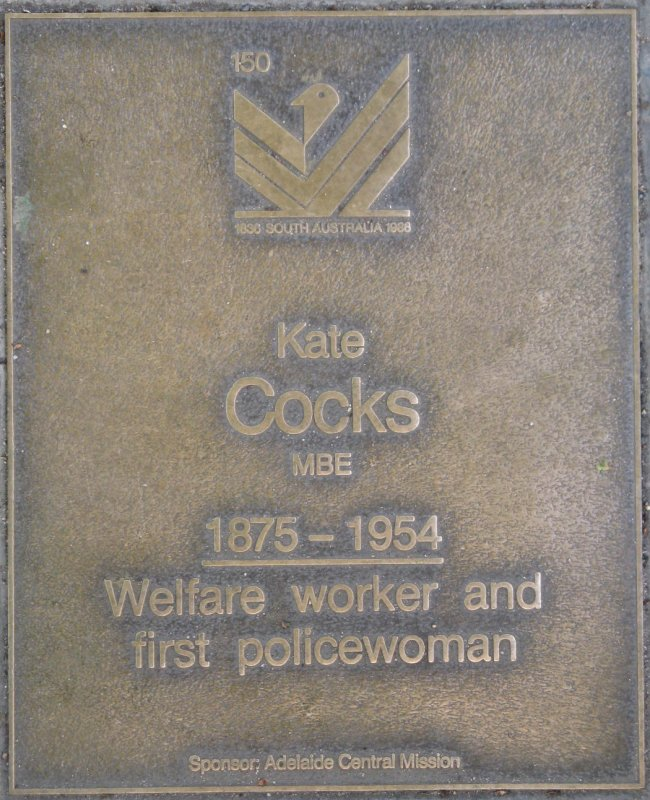
Plaque commemorating Kate Cocks from the Jubille 150 Walkway, on North Terrace, Adelaide.

The facility became known as the Kate Cocks Memorial Babies' Home in 1954. The Home was located in Wattle Street, Brighton now part of Hove. Prior to 1954, the facility was known as the Methodist Home for Babies and Unmarried Mothers. The facility provided health care services and housing for single young women and girls who were pregnant or who had recently given birth. The home also housed children in need of institutional care. An adoption service was run from the facility. Kate Cocks Memorial Babies' Home closed in 1976, and the Methodist Church developed the land into an aged care facility currently called Eldercare Oxford Retirement Village. The Kate Cocks name continued as a day care centre.

The Home played a role in the forcible removal of Aboriginal babies and children from their families known as the Stolen Generations, and in November 2011 the Uniting Communities and the Uniting Church Synod of South Australia, as the Methodist Church became known, formally apologised to generations of mothers who may have experienced coercion to give their babies up for adoption or the forcible removal of babies and children in their care.

Testimony about the Kate Cocks Home is included in the Bringing Them Home Oral History Project, including testimony by Una Clarke who had worked there, and the book Many Voices, prepared for publication by Anna Haebich.

== Later life ==
Cocks was awarded an MBE in June 1935 for her welfare work. She was a justice of the peace, and was a life member of the Justices' Association of South Australia.

Cocks died aged 79 at the Memorial Hospital, Adelaide, on Friday, 20 August 1954, after a short illness.

== See also ==
- Lillian May Armfield (1884–1971), one of the first two female NSW police officers (July 1915)
- Madge Connor (1874–1952), first Victoria Police female 'police agent' (October 1917)
- Zara Dare (1886–1965), one of the first two female Queensland police officers (1931)
- Women in law enforcement
