= Sisters of Charity Health Service, Melbourne =

The Sisters of Charity Health Service, Melbourne, was an entity that has since been reformed into St Vincent's Hospital, Melbourne; the Mater Hospital, Melbourne and other health services. Their motto was "Caritas Christi urget nos (the love of Christ urges us)".
