= St Vincent's Hospital, Melbourne =

- St Vincent’s Health Australia
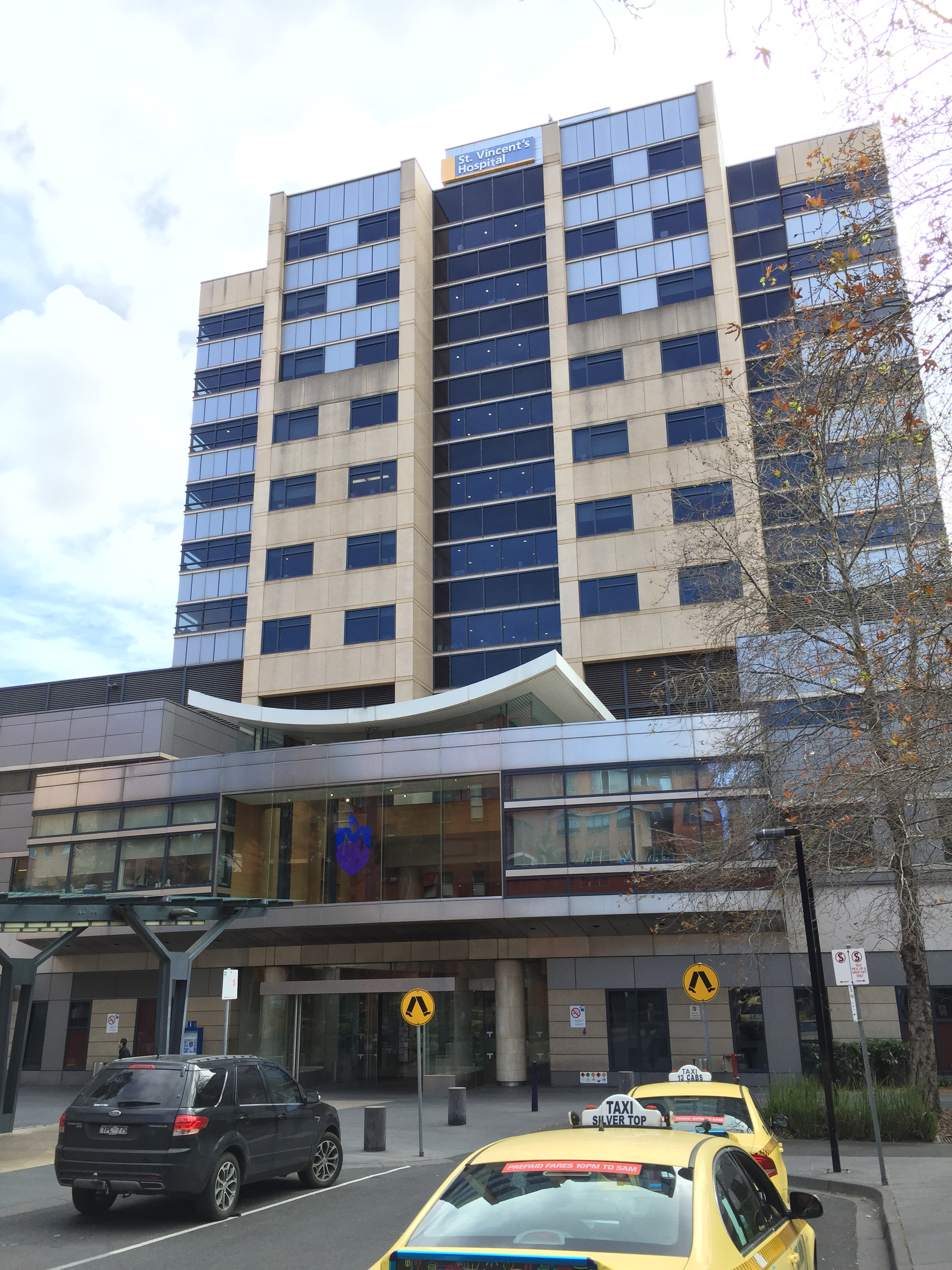
- St Vincent's Hospital

Geography
- Location: Melbourne, Victoria, Australia
- Coordinates: 37°48′25″S 144°58′30″E

Organisation
- Affiliated university: The University of Melbourne

Services
- Emergency department: Yes
- Beds: 504

History
- Founded: 1893

Links
- Website: www.svhm.org.au
- Lists: Hospitals in Australia

St Vincent's Hospital is a major hospital in Fitzroy, Melbourne, Australia.

It is operated by the St Vincent's Health service, previously known as the Sisters of Charity Health Service, Melbourne. It is situated at the corner of Nicholson Street and Victoria Street.

The hospital is a tertiary referral centre which offers a variety of medical, surgical and mental health specialities.

== History ==
St Vincent's Hospital was opened in 1893 as a Catholic hospital owned and operated by the Sisters of Charity. Initially conceived as a branch of the Sydney institution of the same name, the hospital was intended to be a charitable institution, which was hoped would help bolster Melbourne's minimal health care. This idea was given avid support by Melbourne's Catholic Archbishop Dr Thomas Carr, who welcomed the idea of a hospital to take care of the 'poor and sick and abandoned children... the young girls of poor parents and servants...' These ideals corresponded directly with prevalent Victorian ideas of benevolence, which were particularly popular with the middle classes. In these early days, the hospital was quite small, occupying three terrace houses in the corner of Victoria Parade and Regent Street (now occupied by the west end of the Healy Wing), with room for less than 100 beds. Though located very centrally on the edge of the CBD, the suburb beyond, Fitzroy, had some of poorest areas in the city, and the site had been deliberately selected by the founding sisters of the hospital, with many of the poorer residents taking advantage of the advent of a charitable hospital opening up on their doorstep.

Over time, it became a large public hospital, with close links to the Mercy Hospital, Melbourne and St Vincent's Private Hospital Melbourne.

In July 2002, the Sisters of Charity Health Service, Melbourne was rebranded as St Vincent's Health.

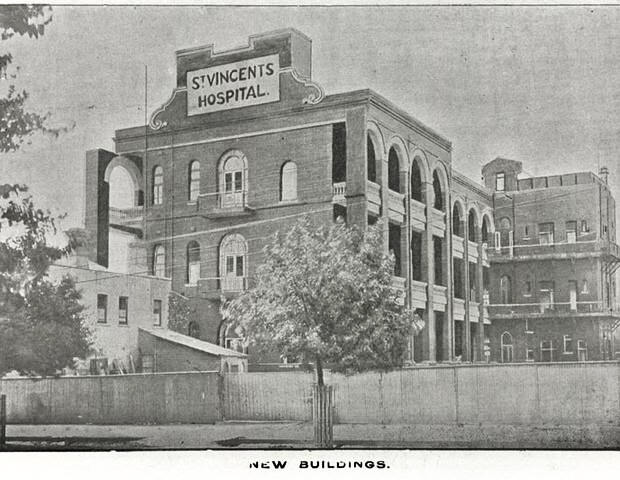
First purpose built block, 1905

The earliest building remaining on the site is a red-brick arched ward block built in 1905 set behind the terraces, which was later joined by the striking stepped brickwork of a new front block, the Healy Wing, built in 1931–34, designed by Stephenson & Meldrum. These two together are now heritage-listed. A private hospital section known as Mt St Evins was built in 1911 on the eastern corner of Victoria Parade and Fitzroy Street. The Druid's Wing west of the Healy Wing was opened on Sunday 11 May 1913 by Dr Mannix, the Roman Catholic coadjutor Archbishop of Melbourne. It housed the hospital's first outpatients' department and a residence for nurses in training.

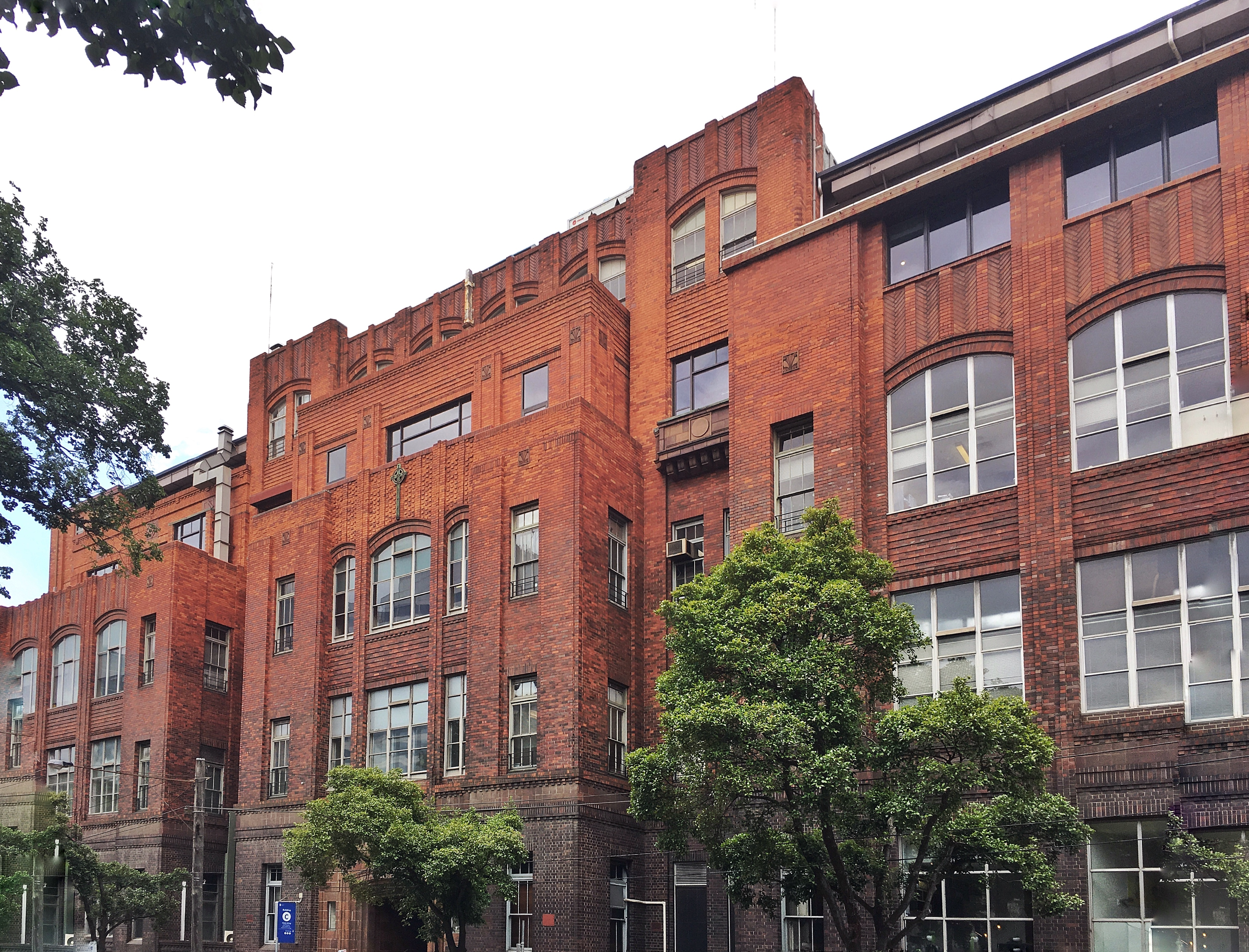
St Vincent's Hospital Healy Wing 1934

The hospital greatly expanded in the 1950s with a convent behind the Healy Wing, a 10-storey nurses home on the corner of Nicholson Street, and the Daly Wing behind that. In the 1960s–70s, the hospital expanded over a much larger area with the Bolte Wing on Nicholson Street, and clinical services buildings on the narrow Princes Street and Regent Streets, now within the hospital grounds. In the early 70s, the private hospital wing was replaced by a larger one, and a medical suites building was built on the west corner of Fitzroy Street c. 1980. In the early 1990s, the convent was demolished and replaced by a new high-rise block, known as the Inpatient Services Building, completed in 1995. The new hospital building was widely praised for its innovative design – for example, complementary medical and surgical specialties (such as neurology/neurosurgery) exist on opposite sides of the same ward, there are decentralised nurses' stations, and satellite pharmacies on every second floor stocking locally relevant medications.

In 2015, it was announced that the Druids Wing would be demolished to make way for a new Aikenhead Centre for Medical Discovery., but it was not removed until 2019.

== The Clinical School ==
A clinical school was opened in St Vincent's Hospital in 1909 as part of the University of Melbourne. It is one of the clinical schools at the University of Melbourne (the others being based at the Royal Melbourne Hospital, the Austin Hospital, Footscray Hospital, the Northern Hospital, Epping, Goulburn Valley Health, Ballarat Base Hospital and Northeast Health).

St Vincent's Hospital is also a clinical school of the University of Notre Dame, Sydney. Third and fourth year students have placements in geriatrics, anaesthetics and ICU.

The hospital also offers a wide range of postgraduate training programs.

== St Vincent's Pathology ==
St Vincent's Pathology is a major pathology service in Victoria, operated out of St Vincent's Hospital. Services offered include anatomical pathology, biochemistry, haematology, cytogenetics and microbiology.

== Clinical specialties and services offered ==
There are several medical and surgical wards at St Vincent's Hospital. There is also a psychiatric unit and an Emergency department.

Note: This is not an exhaustive list.

- Anaesthesia
- Emergency department, including facilities for resuscitation
- Intensive care unit

=== Medical ===
- Cardiology
- Respiratory
- Neurology
- Gastroenterology
- Oncology
- Infectious diseases, Clinical microbiology
- Endocrinology
- Nephrology
- Rheumatology
- Haematology
- Addiction medicine
- General medicine

=== Surgical ===
- Microsurgery
- Plastic surgery
- Cardiothoracic surgery
- Orthopaedic surgery
- Colorectal surgery
- Urology
- Neurosurgery
- General surgery
- Gastrointestinal surgery

=== Mental health ===
- Psychiatry
- ECATT team

St Vincent's Health operates a mental health ward and an Enhanced Crisis Assessment & Treatment Team & Triage Service (ECATT) that assesses patients in the Emergency Department and manages patients with acute psychiatric disorders who are a potential risk to themselves or others in the community.

== See also ==
- List of hospitals in Australia
