= Michaela Kardeis =

Director General for the Public Security
- In office 1 September 2017 – 20 May 2019
- Minister: Herbert Kickl
- Preceded by: Konrad Kogler
- Succeeded by: Peter Goldgruber

Personal details
- Born: Michaela Pfeifenberger; 5 March 1972 (age 53) Salzburg, Austria

Michaela Kardeis (born 5 March 1972) was the Director General for the Public Security in the Austrian Ministry of the Interior. Previously she served as police vice-president at the state police directorate Vienna.
