= Goulburn Valley Health =

Coordinates: 36.3631°S 145.4059°E

Goulburn Valley Health, established in 1876, is the main health service in the Goulburn Valley with 266 acute and sub-acute beds. It offers a wide range of services, including emergency care, allied health, maternity, oncology, and more. With a focus on health equity, the hospital has developed a strategic plan for 2024–2026 to enhance care outcomes, staff wellbeing, and sustainability. The health service has also been recognized for its commitment to culturally safe spaces for the region's large Aboriginal Australians and Torres Strait Islanders community and is actively addressing workforce challenges through a housing project for healthcare workers. In addition, several clinicians were nominated for the 2025 Victorian Rural Health Awards.

== History ==
In 1876, Goulburn Valley Health was established as the Mooroopna and District Hospital, with its incorporation being in February 1877 by authority of the Hospitals and Charities Act. In November 1997, the name was changed to the Goulburn Valley Base Hospital and a year later after receiving formal approval was changed again to Goulburn Valley Health, to correctly represent the hospital's wide range of services provided on a community basis across the Hume region.

According to the most recent annual report, published in August 2024, during the 2023–24 year, Goulburn Valley Health recorded 43,161 presentations to the Emergency Department, with 12,946 ambulance arrivals. The hospital saw 38,640 inpatient separations and 6,004 elective admissions. A total of 904 babies were born, and 306 neonates were admitted to the Neonatal Unit. Additionally, 784 critical care encounters were managed, underscoring the wide range of services provided throughout the year.

Goulburn Valley Health has a strategic plan for 2024–2026 which outlines a three-year approach to enhance health care excellence for the community and region. It focuses on five pillars: improving health outcomes, delivering an outstanding consumer experience, supporting staff wellbeing, ensuring sustainability, and promoting health equity. The plan, developed with input from the community, staff, and partners, aims to address challenges like workforce security and digital transformation, while ensuring tailored, equitable care for diverse populations, including the region's large Aboriginal Australians and Torres Strait Islanders community. Furthermore, in June 2025, construction begun on a new housing project near the hospital, to provide modern accommodation for healthcare workers to address the regional housing shortage. The project, set to be completed by July 2026, features sustainable design and direct access to the hospital, supporting staff wellbeing and safety. As part of its commitment to health equity, in July 2025, Goulburn Valley Health reopened the Minya Barmah Room at Shepparton Hospital, providing a culturally safe space for Aboriginal and Torres Strait Islander patients, families, and community members. The room offers a welcoming environment for individuals to connect with Aboriginal Liaison Officers while accessing healthcare services, and features a design that reflects the natural landscape of the Goulburn Valley.

== Services ==
Goulburn Valley Health offers a wide range of healthcare services, including an emergency department, diagnostic services, imaging, pharmacy, surgical services, aged care, dialysis, maternity, and oncology. Key services also include allied health (such as physiotherapy, podiatry, and speech pathology), community health programs like the Diabetes Centre, as well as specialized clinics for paediatrics, chronic pain, and mental health.

In addition to its main site on Graham Street, Shepparton, Goulburn Valley Health has three more sites in the nearby towns of Rushworth, Tatura, and Euroa.

== Recognition and achievements ==
In June 2025, several clinicians from Goulburn Valley Health were nominated for the prestigious Victorian Rural Health Awards, recognizing their outstanding contributions to rural healthcare. These nominations, across multiple categories, highlight the dedication and impact of Goulburn Valley Health staff in areas such as medical specialties, allied health, primary care, and mentoring.
