= William Harold Ryan =

Commissioner of the Queensland Police Force

Commissioner William Ryan
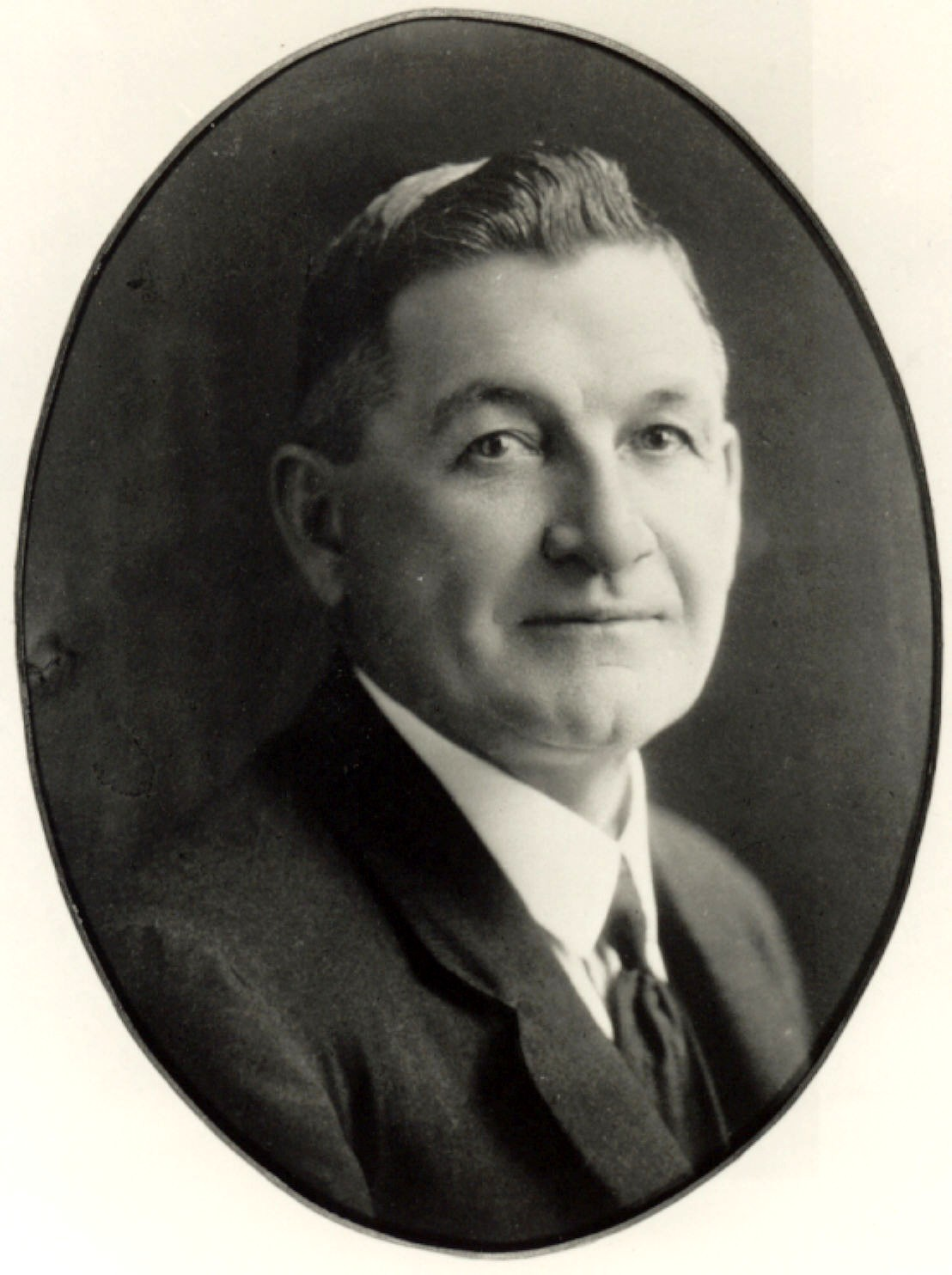

Commissioner of the Queensland Police Force
- In office 16 January 1925 – 7 May 1934
- Preceded by: Patrick Short
- Succeeded by: Cec Carroll

Personal details
- Born: 5 May 1873 Lower Tent Hill, Gatton, Queensland
- Died: 16 July 1954 (aged 81) Toowong, Queensland
- Resting place: Toowong Cemetery, Brisbane, Queensland
- Profession: Police officer

William Harold Ryan (5 May 1873 – 16 July 1954) was a police officer who served as the sixth Commissioner of the Queensland Police Force from January 1925 until his retirement in May 1934. Commencing as a constable in the organisation, he served 41 years as a police officer, nine years as the commissioner.

== Early life ==
Ryan was born to William Ryan (d. 2 August 1925, aged 85) and Catherine Higgins, being raised in Lower Tent Hill near Gatton. William senior was born at Cratlow-Wood, County Clare, Ireland, before emigrating to Australia, aged 14. A farmer in the district, William senior was twice married, with three sons and three daughters including Catherine 'Kitty'. William Ryan junior had attended the Upper Tent Hill school, and became well-known in the Laidley and Esk districts as an athlete.

== Career ==
Ryan joined the Queensland Police Force on 11 April 1893, serving throughout Queensland, including Townsville, Bowen, Woolgar, Charters Towers, Proserpine, Plane Creek, Ravenswood, Cairns, Mareeba, Roma Street, Petrie Terrace, Georgetown, and Charleville. He was considered to be a good bush tracker, and an expert bushman. Cattle thieves at one point bestowed the nickname 'Flying Sergeant' upon Ryan, in part for when his presence arose suspicion in an area, he would casually remark 'I am going fishing'. Other than those stations, Ryan was made officer in charge of Townsville District, and later the Criminal Investigation Branch, Brisbane.

In 1901, first-class constable Ryan concluded duty at Plane Creek, south of Mackay, and commenced duty at Ravenswood, south of Charters Towers.

Ryan became an acting-sergeant by 12 July 1906. By November 1908, he was based at Mareeba, giving evidence in the murder of Nellie Duffy at Carpentaria Downs station.

Ryan attained sergeant on 6 April 1909, and senior sergeant on 7 July 1910.

In July 1913, having been a third-class sub-inspector from 8 September 1911, Ryan was assigned to the Normanton police district, to be stationed at Georgetown.

Ryan's other promotions included second-class sub-inspector on 22 April 1915, first-class sub-inspector on 10 October 1916, second-class inspector on 11 November 1918, first-class inspector on 11 November 1920, senior inspector on 16 January 1921, and chief inspector on 2 November 1923.

Commissioner

On taking up the role as Commissioner of the Queensland Police Force on Monday 16 January 1925 with thirty-one years service, already described in some newspapers as 'a Cromwell, overbearing and arrogant', and 'a big, athletic man', he was faced with a serious dispute with the police union over the transfer of its president, and issues in Innisfail, Queensland where the shire council was supporting attacks on police. The complaints aired in the Johnstone Shire Council meeting were that members of the public were assaulted at the rear of the Innisfail police station.

He noted in February 1925, shortly after becoming Commissioner and returning from an interstate conference, that traffic problems were increasing with the number of motor vehicles, although wireless radio for police vehicles was not a necessity 'for some time to come' as Brisbane did not have the slum areas like Sydney and Melbourne. He established night duty bicycle patrols in the Metropolitan District and bought two motorised prison vans to replace the horse-drawn 'Black Maria'. By November 1930, the use of police wireless patrol services was still denied by Ryan on the grounds that such expenditure could not be justified, and the requirements could be met through bicycle patrol and the motorcycles that were in use. He embraced motorisation of the Force and at the end of his tenure there were thirteen motorcycles and three vehicles available for use across the State.

Ryan's tenure included a push for pay increases for all police officers.

In June 1927 when a request was made at the Queensland Country Women's Association conference at Rockhampton 'for the appointment of women police', Ryan responded the time had not yet arrived.

There is at present no intention on the part of the police authorities of Queensland to augment the force by the creation of squads of women police

However by October 1930, 'Queensland has decided to fall in line with most of the other Australian states and appoint policewomen', with two or three officers to 'have particular duties to perform, principally with women and children'. In 1931 Mr Ryan sanctioned the recruitment of the Force's first two female police officers, forty-five-year-old Miss Zara Dare and thirty-year-old Miss Eileen O'Donnell, from sixty applicants.

He retired with forty-one years of service on Monday, 7 May 1934, handing over to incoming commissioner Cec Carroll. The Force stood at about 1100 officers. It was reported that as he walked one final time out of his office he casually remarked 'I am going fishing'.

== Later life ==
On 17 September 1901, recently of Plane Creek (today, Sarina), south of Mackay but now based in Ravenswood, Ryan married Margaret Inglis Beagrie. She was born in Edinburgh c. 1880 to James Beagrie and Jessie Ann Cowie, and emigrated with her family to Sarina, where her father was a pioneer resident. Ryan earlier that year had come to rescue Beagrie in a seaside incident. Together they had three daughters, and later, at least three grandchildren. Daughter Jessica Inglis Ryan (d. 1982) went on to marry James Francis Tobin (1918–2007).

Ryan post-retirement continued as an avid Queensland fisherman, labelled a practitioner of Izaak Walton, a reference to the author of The Compleat Angler (1653).

On Wednesday 26 December 1945, aged 65, Ryan's wife Margaret died after a long illness, and was buried in the Toowong Cemetery.

On the evening of Friday, 16 July 1954, 81-year-old Ryan died outside his home in Sherwood Road, Toowong after being 'struck by a taxi cab'. The funeral left Saint Ignatius Church, Kensington Terrace to Toowong Cemetery on Monday 19 July 1954, where he was buried beside his wife Margaret.

== Honours and awards ==
Formerly of Mackay police station, on 18 July 1902, the Royal Humane Society's medal and certificate for life-saving were presented to Ryan for saving the life of Miss Dollie Kemp. The Society's annual report stated police constable Ryan, aged 27, of Plane Creek (nowadays Sarina) near Mackay, rescued Kemp from drowning at Sarina Inlet on 27 January 1901. While bathing with five other ladies, she got into deep water and was carried 100 yards (91 m) from shore. At least 1 mile (1.6 km) further along, Ryan galloped to the scene, attempted to swim out to her, but failing to make way, 'stripped in the sea, and eventually succeeded in bringing her back against a strong current'. He had to swim more than 2 miles (3.2 km). Returning with Kemp, Ryan also had the hair of one of the rescued females clenched between his teeth. He was able to resuscitate the unconscious Kemp. Of the three persons he rescued, one became the wife of later-Inspector Frank Broderick Kearney, and twenty-year-old Margaret Beagrie married Ryan in the same year as the rescue.

Police appointments
Preceded by Patrick Short	Commissioner of the Queensland Police Force; 1925–1934	Succeeded by Cec Carroll
