= Patrick Short (police commissioner) =

Commissioner of the Queensland Police Force

Commissioner Patrick Short
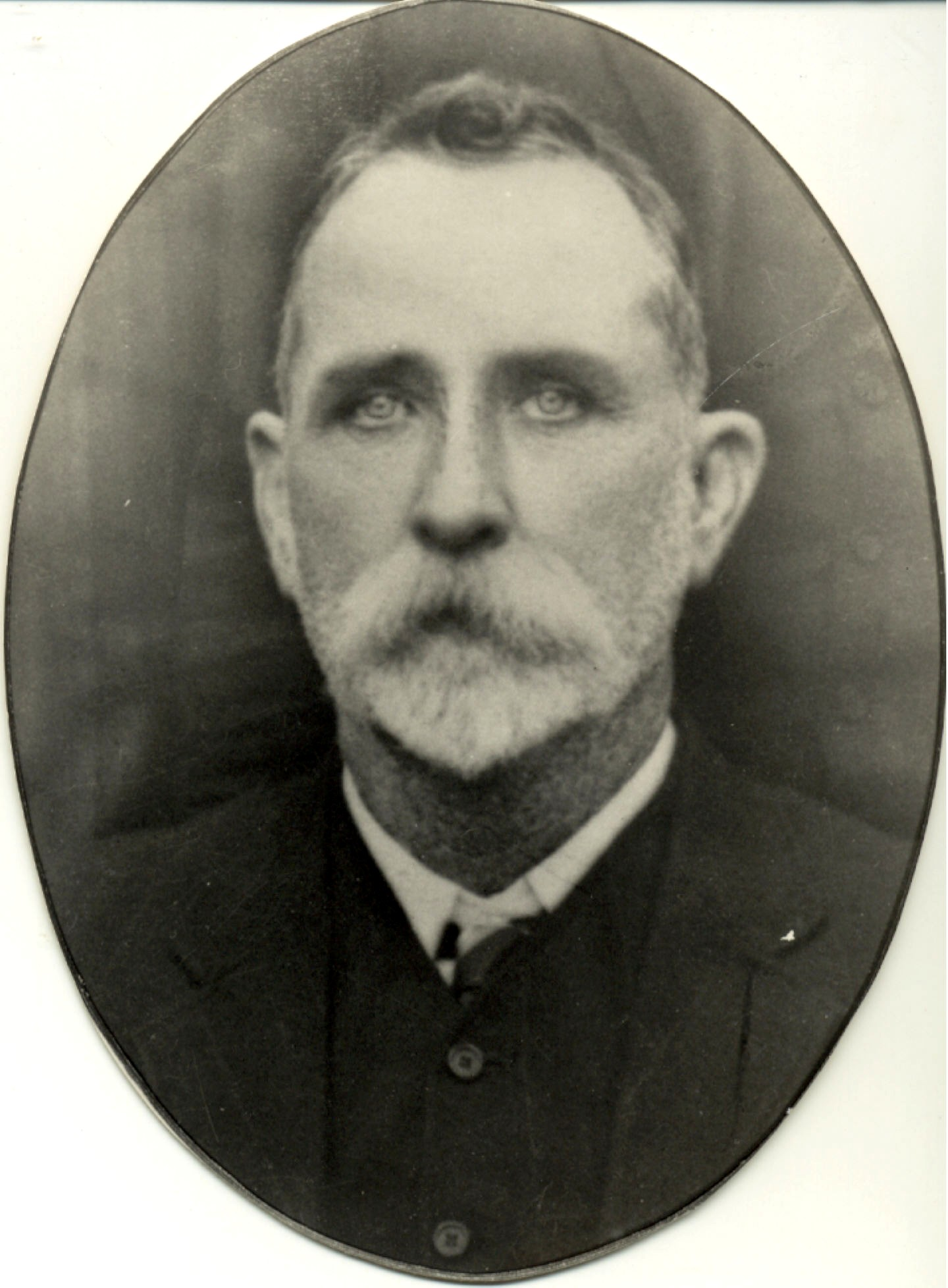

Commissioner of the Queensland Police Force
- In office January 1921 – January 1925
- Preceded by: Frederic Urquhart
- Succeeded by: William Ryan

Personal details
- Born: June 14, 1859 Ipswich, Queensland
- Died: February 14, 1941 (aged 81) Clayfield, Brisbane, Queensland
- Resting place: Lutwyche Cemetery, Brisbane
- Spouse: Eleanor Teresa Short (c. 1859–1936)
- Profession: Police officer

Patrick Short (1859–1941) was a police officer who served as the Commissioner of the Queensland Police Force from 1921 until his retirement in 1925. He was the first Queensland-born police commissioner.

== Early life ==
Born to Patrick Short and Mary Keogh, who had emigrated in 1855 from Ireland to Ipswich, west of Brisbane. Patrick senior established an engineering and blacksmith's works in Bell Street, but died on 5 November 1862 while Patrick junior was still a child. Growing up, Short started in the building trade, before going to south-west Queensland to work.

== Career ==
On 14 May 1878, Short joined the very small Queensland Police Force, training in Brisbane, before being posted to the then-most distant south-western station of Saint George.

Within his first few weeks, Short's first arrest was a naked man with a firearm terrifying the people at a property. After a clever ruse, the man was captured. The firearm was later discharged, and burst because it had been loaded almost to the muzzle. Together with Trooper Power, he later went to Booligar, on the Narran River to establish a camp with rumours of the Ned Kelly gang of bushrangers working towards the area from New South Wales. As a competent horseman, he also covered great distances after stock thieves.

After serving more areas in the Maranoa, including Marburg, he was promoted on 1 January 1884 as acting-sergeant, soon rising to senior sergeant. In 1898 Short became the officer in charge of the South Brisbane police station, and in January 1901, the senior sergeant in charge of the Criminal Investigation Branch. He then became a sub-inspector third-class in January 1904, until transferred at his own request to Maryborough in 1910, then onto Toowoomba for seven months. A promotion to senior inspector saw Short move to Petrie Terrace Police Depot, to overview the Brisbane district. In January 1917, he became the senior inspector for the State for criminal investigation.

Announced in December 1920, on 16 January 1921 on the retirement of Commissioner Urquhart who became the Administrator of the Northern Territory, Chief Inspector Short was appointed to the rank of commissioner for a period of three years. He was the first constable and Queensland-born officer to become commissioner.

As a horse lover and judge of blood lines, as one of his actions as Commissioner, he sought to improve the Queensland police horse at the police horse breeding station of Rewan, at Springsure.

During his tenure he condensed the number of police districts from twelve to ten, and oversaw changes to the Police Act in regard to improving police pensions and family allowances. In 1924 Short witnessed legislation which provided a system of appeal against promotions to members of the Queensland Police Union up to and including the rank of senior sergeant.

With 46.5 years in the force, Short announced his retirement in early December 1924. He remained as commissioner to 16 January 1925, reaching 65 years-of-age, when he retired with an unblemished record on £700 per annum.

== Later life ==
While a young constable, Short married Eleanor Teresa Butler on 30 June 1880 at the Roman Catholic Church at Roma, Queensland. The daughter of Richard Butler and Josephine Lewzbauer, she was born in County Leitrim, Ireland, and arrived in Roma, aged 15. Eleanor was given to be popular and intellectual, an active croquet club member with other sporting interests, and a racegoer like her husband. During World War I, she engaged in philanthropic and war work.

Upon retirement under the original police superannunation scheme, a testimonial for Short on 27 February 1925 raised £485. He continued his involvement in horses, attending the race meetings at Eagle Farm.

Short's wife Eleanor died on 19 February 1936 at the family residence at 19 Bellevue Terrace, Clayfield, Brisbane, and was buried in the Lutwyche Cemetery, Brisbane. Short himself died at his residence on 14 February 1941, with the service held at Saint Agatha's Church, Clayfield, and was buried with his wife.

At the time of his death, he and Eleanor had three sons ((P)atrick Victor, Richard Patrick Montfort, and Robert) and five daughters (later, Mrs K. S. McGill in Sydney, Mrs W. Wilson of Tewantin, Mrs A. Ellison of Brisbane, Miss Frances 'Fanny' Catherine, and Miss Eileen Alma).

Police appointments
Preceded by Frederic Urquhart	Commissioner of the Queensland Police Force; 1921–1925	Succeeded by William Ryan
