= Frederic Urquhart =

Australian policeman

Frederic Charles Urquhart
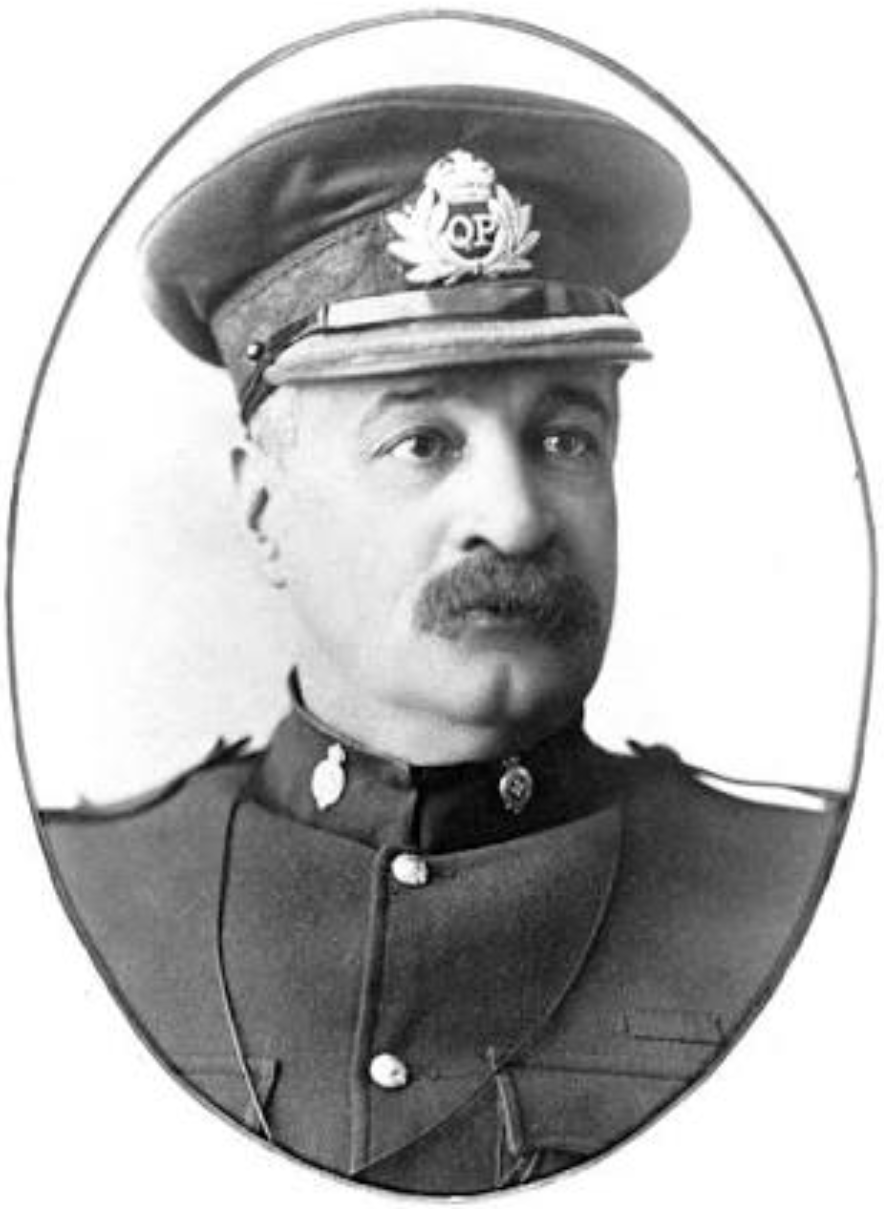
- Frederick Charles Urquhart

Administrator of the Northern Territory
- In office 17 January 1921 – 16 January 1926
- Preceded by: Henry Ernest Carey
- Succeeded by: Robert Weddell (as Government Resident of North Australia); John C. Cawood (as Government Resident of Central Australia)

Commissioner of the Queensland Police Service
- In office 1 January 1917 – 16 January 1921
- Preceded by: William Geoffrey Cahill
- Succeeded by: Patrick Short

Personal details
- Born: 27 October 1858; St Leonards-on-Sea, Hastings, England
- Died: 2 December 1935 (aged 77); Brisbane, Queensland, Australia

Frederic Charles Urquhart (27 October 1858 – 2 December 1935) was a Native Police officer, Queensland Police Commissioner and Administrator of the Northern Territory.

== Early life ==
Frederic Charles Urquhart was born at St Leonards-on-Sea, Hastings, East Sussex, England on 27 October 1858. His father was an officer in the Royal Artillery and his uncle was a colonel in a cavalry regiment of the British Army. He was educated at Bloxham School in Oxfordshire and at Felsted School in Essex, but left to pursue a career at sea at the age of fourteen. He obtained a second-officer certificate in the merchant navy and served as a midshipman in the Royal Navy. In 1875 he migrated to Queensland, where he worked in the sugar and cattle industries. In 1878 Urquhart became a telegraph linesman at Normanton, Queensland.

== Native Police career ==
In 1882, Urquhart was appointed to the paramilitary Native Police as a cadet and was promoted quickly to the rank of second-class sub-inspector within the year. He was initially posted to the barracks near Georgetown and then to the Carl Creek camp on the Gregory River. While stationed at Carl Creek, Urquhart was ordered to go to Burketown and remove the Aboriginals residing there. He rounded them up and marched them east to the Leichhardt River where he threatened to shoot dead their traditional healer if he did not make it rain.

In March 1884 Urquhart was transferred to the Cloncurry district to replace the Native Police officer, Marcus Beresford, who had recently been killed in the ongoing conflict with the local Indigenous population. Urquhart and his troopers were soon involved in skirmishes with the resident Kalkadoon and Maithakari peoples. He established a barracks outside of Cloncurry at a locality on the Corella River now known as Urquhart. In July 1884 a well-known colonist, James Powell, was killed by Aboriginals in the region and Urquhart and his troopers were mobilised to conduct a punitive expedition. Alexander Kennedy, a pioneer Scottish pastoralist in the Gulf Country district, accompanied Urquhart in his mission. Together this armed group conducted at least two large massacres of local Aboriginal people. Urquhart later wrote a poem entitled Powell's Revenge about one of the massacres. Some of the stanzas of this poem are as follows:

"Fire!" The word rang clearly out
in the fresh mountain air
from rock and craig that single shout
is answered everywhere.

See how the wretched traitors fly
smitten with abject fear
they dare not stop to fight and die
and soon the field is clear.

Unless just dotted here and there
a something on the ground
a something black with matted hair
lies without life or sound.

A prospector in the area also came across Urquhart and Kennedy during their expedition. He described how they and the troopers had shot up one native camp, capturing an Aboriginal woman whom they were forcing to lead them to another Aboriginal camp. Kennedy returned to Cloncurry after four weeks out conducting summary justice, but Urquhart and his troopers patrolled the region for an additional five weeks "clearing up" any assemblage of native people they found. Urquhart became a close associate of Alexander Kennedy, who regularly accompanied him on other Native Police patrols. Kennedy later became a founding director of the Qantas airline company.

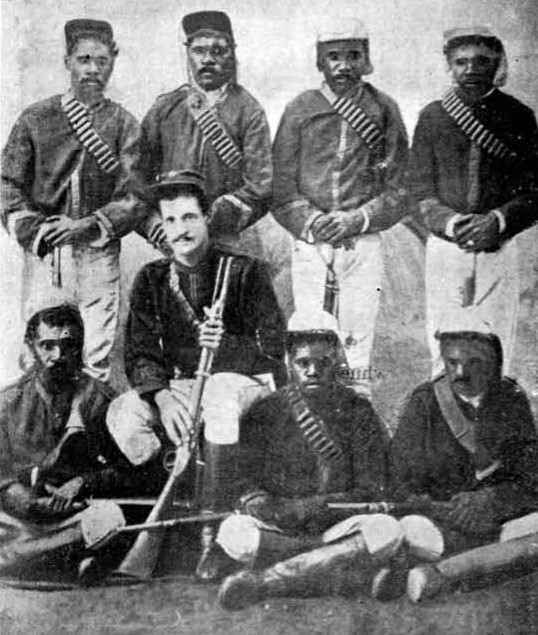
Frederic Urquhart and his section of Native Police in the early 1880s

While based at Cloncurry, Urquhart was involved in other massacres of Indigenous people. Probably the most well known of these was the skirmish later known as the Battle Mountain massacre. Urquhart and his troopers were following up the killing of a shepherd at the Granada sheep station when they encountered a group of Kalkadoon. The Kalkadoon retreated to a rocky hill at the head of Prospector's Creek where they proceeded to pelt the Native Police with stones and spears. Urquhart was hit in the head and momentarily lost consciousness. He quickly recovered and led the Native Police in a flanking movement around the hill and proceeded to massacre the resisting group of Kalkadoon. For decades afterwards the hill was littered with the bones of the men, women and children killed.

In 1888, Urquhart was transferred to conduct Native Police operations on the Cape York Peninsula. He was speared in the leg during a skirmish with Aboriginal people at the headwaters of the Wenlock River. This occurred as part of a punitive mission following the killing of colonist Edmund Watson near the Archer River. Urquhart and his troopers patrolled extensively around the peninsula and were also assigned a vessel named the Albatross to travel around various islands in the Torres Strait. In 1890, Urquhart played a major role in the rescue of survivors from the shipwrecked RMS Quetta.

== General police career ==
Urquhart was transferred to the civilian Queensland Police service in 1891 and returned to Cloncurry. He led police activities against striking workers in the area during the 1891 Australian shearers' strike. In 1894 he was assigned back to the Torres Strait and was based at Thursday Island. In the police vessel, the Albatross, he patrolled the pearling operations in the Torres Strait Islands, arresting striking workers. With John Douglas, Urquhart conducted an exploration journey around the Embley River in 1895. Urquhart was promoted to inspector in 1897 and was transferred to Brisbane in order to head the Criminal Investigation Branch (CIB).

Soon after Urquhart was appointed to the CIB, a number of botched police investigations into high-profile murders such as the Gatton murders, led to the 1899 Royal Commission into the Queensland Police. The Commission found that Urquhart was neglectful in his duties, unsuited to the position and untrained in detective work. It recommended that Urquhart be transferred out of the CIB and a more competent person be appointed to the role as head of the investigative branch.

Despite the findings of the commission, many of the recommendations were not acted upon and Urquhart remained head of the CIB for many years after the enquiry. In 1905 he was promoted to chief inspector of police. Urquhart again had a leading role in crushing striking unionists during the 1912 Brisbane general strike, the first mass strike of its kind in Australia. Urquhart mustered 2,000 police officers and special constables to attack a group of 15,000 striking workers. The officers were armed with bayoneted rifles and Urquhart threatened to use live ammunition if the marchers did not disperse. Urquhart ordered mounted troopers to charge through the crowd. Many people were injured with two people probably being killed. Around 500 strikers were arrested.

== Queensland Police Commissioner ==
On 1 January 1917 Urquhart was appointed as the 4th Queensland Police Commissioner, a position he held until 16 January 1921. Probably the most notable incident during his tenure as Commissioner was the Red Flag riots that occurred in Brisbane in 1919. Police, together with armed ex-soldiers returned from WWI, fought extended street battles with unionists and Russian immigrants during these riots. Many casualties were reported with Urquhart himself being injured during the fighting. Later that same year, police operations were again focused upon when several striking workers were injured in Townsville after police opened fire on a group of unionists with live ammunition.

== Administrator of the Northern Territory ==
In 1921 Urquhart was appointed Administrator of the Northern Territory. During his period as administrator he faced several issues including the widespread non-payment of taxes by civilians and his own personal health issues. He was also successfully sued by a union official for assault. He resigned from the position in early 1926.

== Poetry ==
Urquhart was considered a poet of some talent and published several collections of verse including The Legend of the Blacks and Camp Canzonettes. Many of his writings centred around relaying his experiences of shooting Aboriginal Australians. For instance the poem Told by the Camp Fire has the lines:

And at break of day next mornin'
We was there afore the sun-
Planted all round about their camp
So's we couldn't lose e'er a one.

There was eight of them native troopers
And me and their boss made ten;
And the mercy them devils gave to Sal
Were the mercy we showed them.

I have heerd a lot of playin'
on piannys and organs too;
But the music of them there rifles
Were the sweetest I ever knew.

== Family and later life ==
Urquhart married Annetta Atkinson in 1891 and they had three children together; Miriam, Walter James and Hope Goldie Urquhart. Miriam married George Addison who was a WWI army officer and noted architect. Walter James Urquhart became the first officer to graduate from the Australian Army officer training program at the Royal Military College, Duntroon and he fought at Gallipoli and in Palestine during WWI. Walter remained with the army after the war but his career was hampered by charges of sexual assault of children. Frederic's youngest son, Hope Goldie Urquhart, was consistently in trouble with the law particularly in regards to driving under the influence of alcohol. In 1930, Hope was the pilot of a plane that crashed into the Brisbane River causing the death of a passenger. Hope was found guilty of flying in a dangerous manner and had his licence suspended.

Frederic Urquhart retired to Brisbane in 1926. He died at St Helen's Private Hospital on 2 December 1935 and was buried in Toowong Cemetery.
