= Cecil James Carroll =

Commissioner Cecil James Carroll MVO, MC
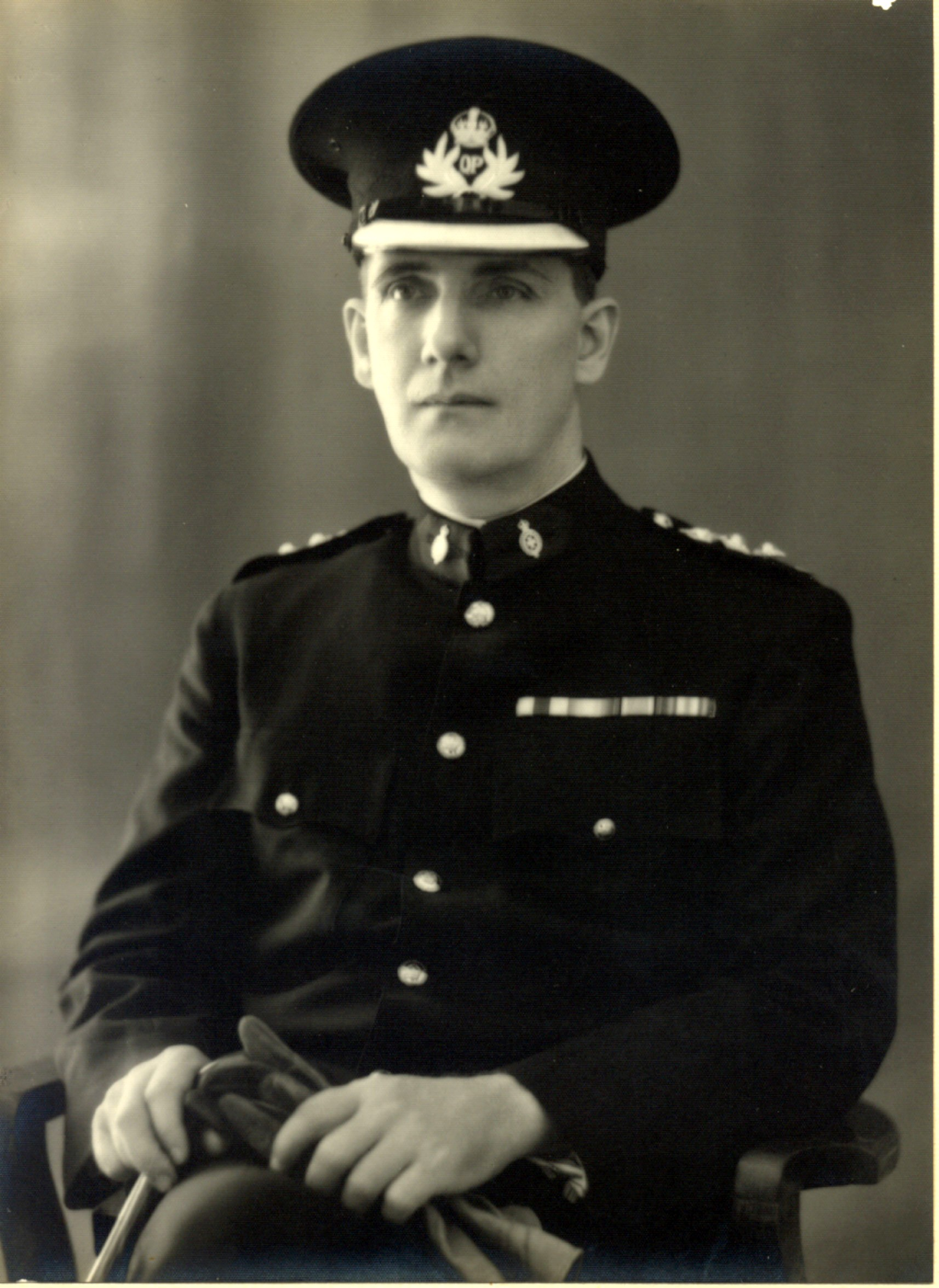

Commissioner of the Queensland Police Service
- In office 8 May 1934 – 6 July 1949
- Preceded by: William Harold Ryan
- Succeeded by: John Smith

Personal details
- Born: 8 July 1888 Woombye, Queensland
- Died: 21 April 1970 (aged 81) Brisbane, Queensland
- Profession: Police officer, school teacher

Military service
- Allegiance: Australia
- Branch/service: Australian Imperial Force
- Years of service: 1915–1918
- Rank: Captain
- Unit: 9th Battalion
- Battles/wars: First World War
- Awards: Member of the Royal Victorian Order; Military Cross; Mentioned in Despatches

Cecil James "Cec" Carroll, MVO, MC (8 July 1888 – 21 May 1970) was a commissioner of the Queensland Police Force from 8 May 1934 to 6 July 1949.

== Early life ==
Carroll was born in the police station at Woombye, Queensland, on 8 July 1888, the son of Patrick Carroll and Margaret (née McGrath). Patrick Carroll was then a country policeman who rose to the rank of inspector and retired after 44 years of service.

== Career ==
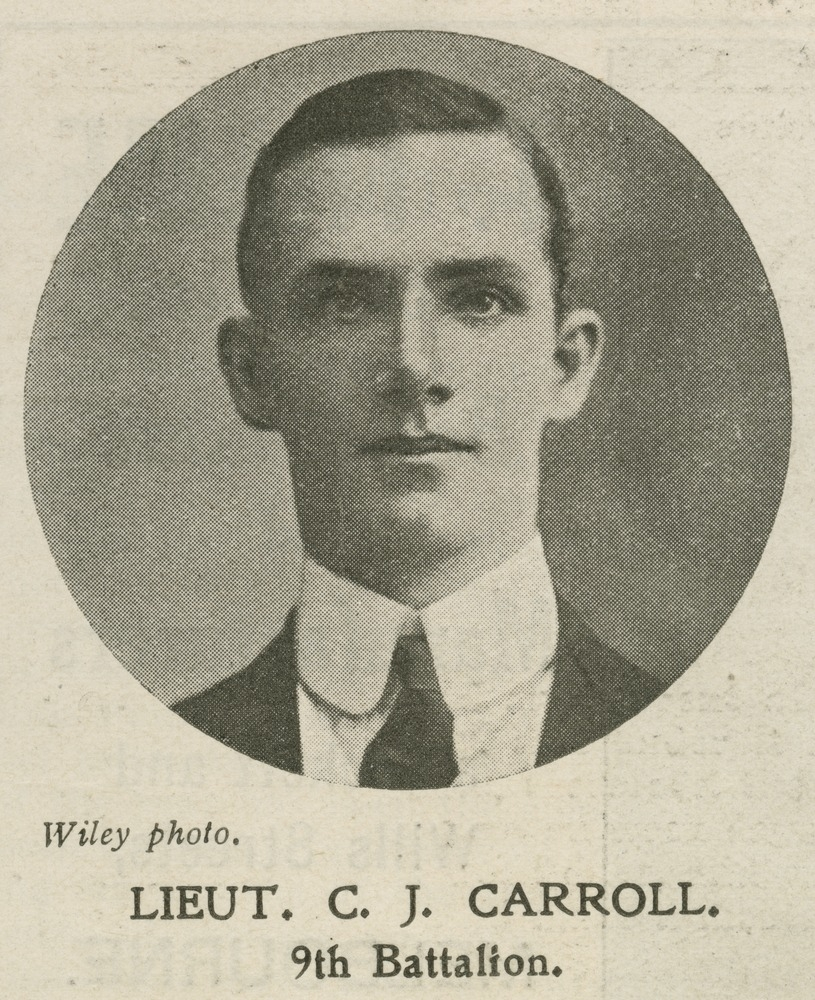
Lieutenant C J Carroll, 1914

Carroll was a junior teacher in the state school at Blackall in 1904. Later he taught in Cairns and Brisbane. He enlisted for military service during the First World War. He went overseas in 1915. In the 9th Battalion he became a captain, was wounded twice, and was awarded the Military Cross and mentioned in despatches. One of his subordinates in France was Ned Hanlon, later Premier of Queensland from 1946 to 1952. In 1918 Carroll was invalided back to Australia.

Carroll was appointed to the State Land and Income Tax Department. He was rapidly promoted from assessor, inspector (1922), senior inspector (1923), assistant chief inspector (1927), and chief inspector (1929). He was appointed a Royal Commissioner to inquire into the payment of secret commissions in the dairying industry in 1932.

Carroll was held in high regard by the Queensland Government due to his powers of organisation and discipline both as a military officer and as a civil servant. His work in charge of the Inspection Branch of the Taxation Department has been of enormous value to the Government.

In 1933 the Queensland Government was looking round for a man to fill the Commissionership of Police about to be vacated by W. H. Ryan. Although there were strong candidates among the senior commissioned police officers, the government thought that a thorough reorganisation of the force was required. Carrol was appointed in January 1934 by the then Minister for Home Affairs, Ned Hanlon. The appointment of a commissioner from outside the police force was unusual, but not without precedent either in Queensland or in other states of Australia.

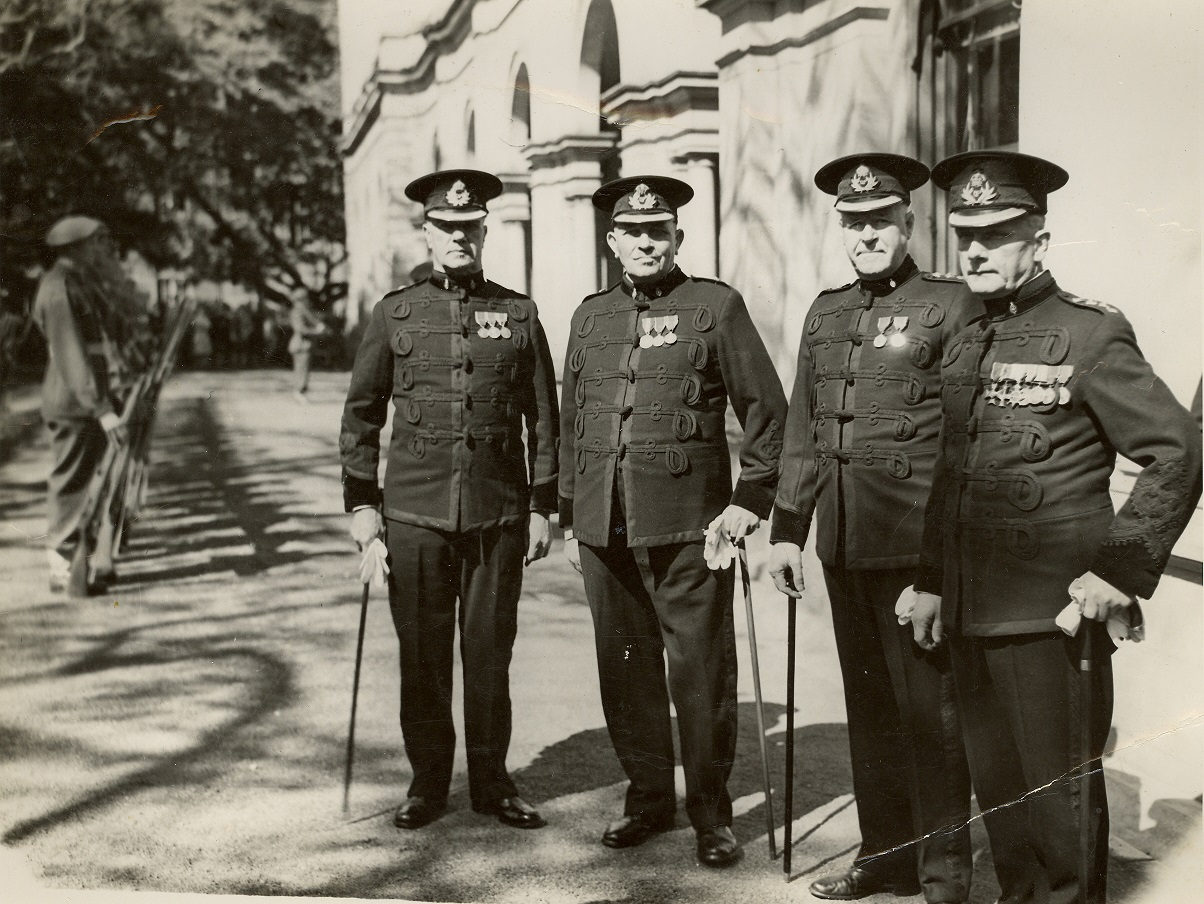
Commissioner Carrol, right, outside Parliament House, Brisbane, circa 1937

There was some resentment from within the police force at his appointment. It was felt that an outside appointment would result in reducing promotion opportunities within the force. Carroll decided that the best answer to the criticism was to show his merits through vigorous reforms.

During his 15 years as Commissioner, Carroll built the Queensland police force into one of the best organised and most efficient in Australia. He developed a system of instruction and training, initiated a qualifying examination for promotion within the grades, promoted young promising men, acquired cars and motor cycles which gave the force a mobility it had never known before, organised the metropolis into three districts: one for Brisbane itself, and one each for the North Coast (now the Sunshine Coast) and the South Coast (now the Gold Coast). He encouraged specialisation. Within the Criminal Investigation Branch he directed the use of modern methods that made crime detection easier.

Carroll did not spare himself, refusing to take a long vacation, except for a brief visit to California. He resigned because of ill-health, two days before his 61st birthday.

== Later life ==
Carroll died on 21 May 1970.

== See also ==
- History of the Queensland Police
