= Lutwyche Cemetery =

Australian cemetery in Brisbane

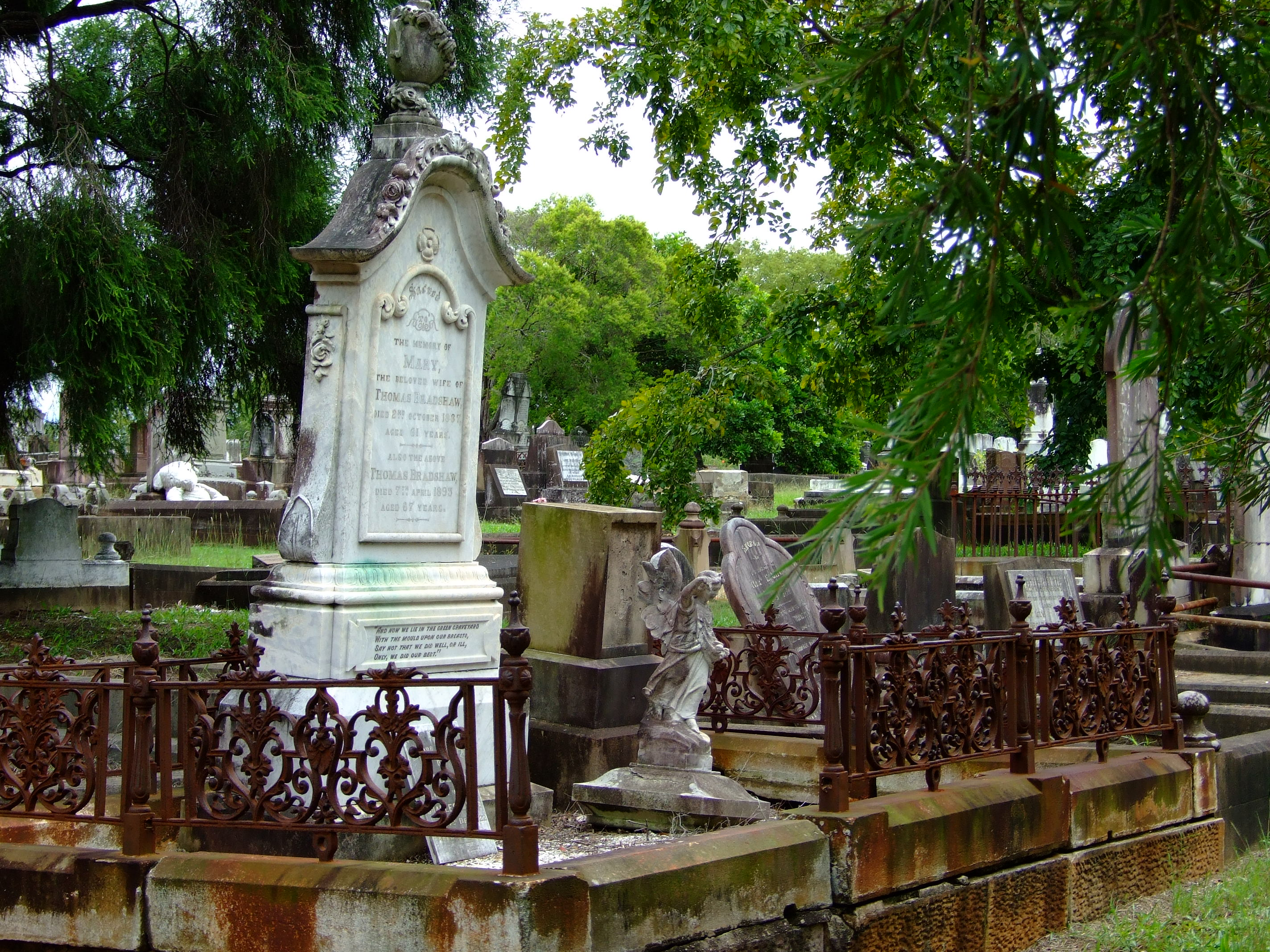
- Interactive map of Lutwyche Cemetery

Details
- Established: 1878
- Location: Kedron, Brisbane
- Country: Australia
- Coordinates: 27°24′6″S 153°1′44″E
- Type: Monumental
- Owned by: Brisbane City Council
- No. of graves: ≈32,000
- Website: https://graves.brisbane.qld.gov.au/
- Find a Grave: Lutwyche Cemetery

Lutwyche Cemetery is a cemetery located at Kedron, Brisbane, Queensland, Australia. It opened in 1878 and saw its first burial in the same year. It is located at the corner of Gympie and Kitchener Roads, approximately ten kilometres north of Brisbane.

== Notable people interred ==
A list of people buried in Lutwyche Cemetery can be found in the Category:Burials at Lutwyche Cemetery and in the list below:

- Charles Moffatt Jenkinson (1865–1954), Member of the Queensland Legislative Assembly and mayor of Brisbane
- Lionel Lukin (1868–1944), Supreme Court of Queensland judge
- Patrick Short (1859–1941), the first Queensland-born police commissioner (1921–1925)
- Billy Sing (1886–1943), World War I sniper
- John Andrew Stuart (1940–1979), who along with James Richard Finch was responsible for the 1973 Whiskey Au Go Go fire that killed 15 people
- George Witton (1874–1942), court martialed along with Breaker Morant and Peter Handcock for the killing of Boer prisoners
- Buddy Williams (1918–1986), Australian country music pioneer

== War graves ==
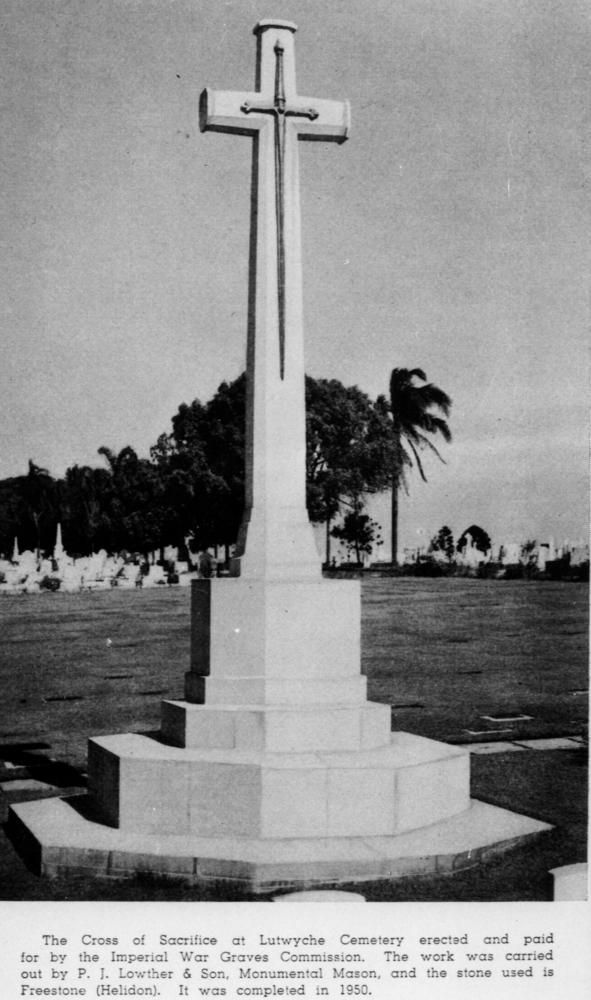
Cross of Sacrifice at Lutwyche Cemetery, circa 1954

The cemetery contains war graves of nine Commonwealth service personnel of World War I and 389 of World War II, besides three servicemen of other nationalities. Within the cemetery's war graves plot stands the Queensland Cremation Memorial, erected by the Commonwealth War Graves Commission, recording 36 Australian service personnel who died in Queensland during World War II and were cremated at Mount Thompson Crematorium.

Within the cemetery is a Cross of Sacrifice commemorating those who served in World War I and World War II, which was erected and paid for by the Imperial War Graves Commission. The stone used is Freestone (Helidon) and it was completed in 1950.

== Gallery ==
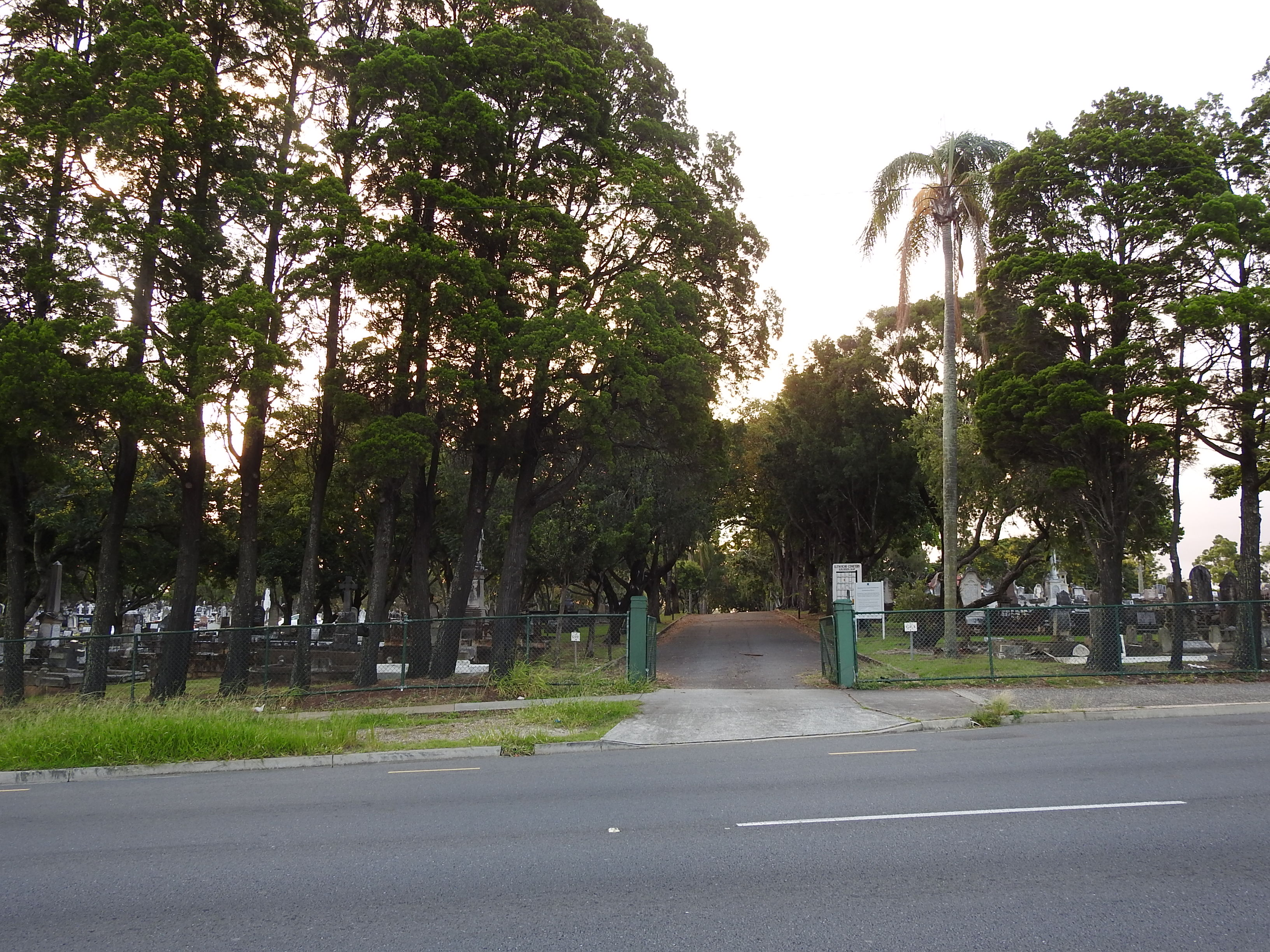
Entry gate from Gympie Road looking west (2021).

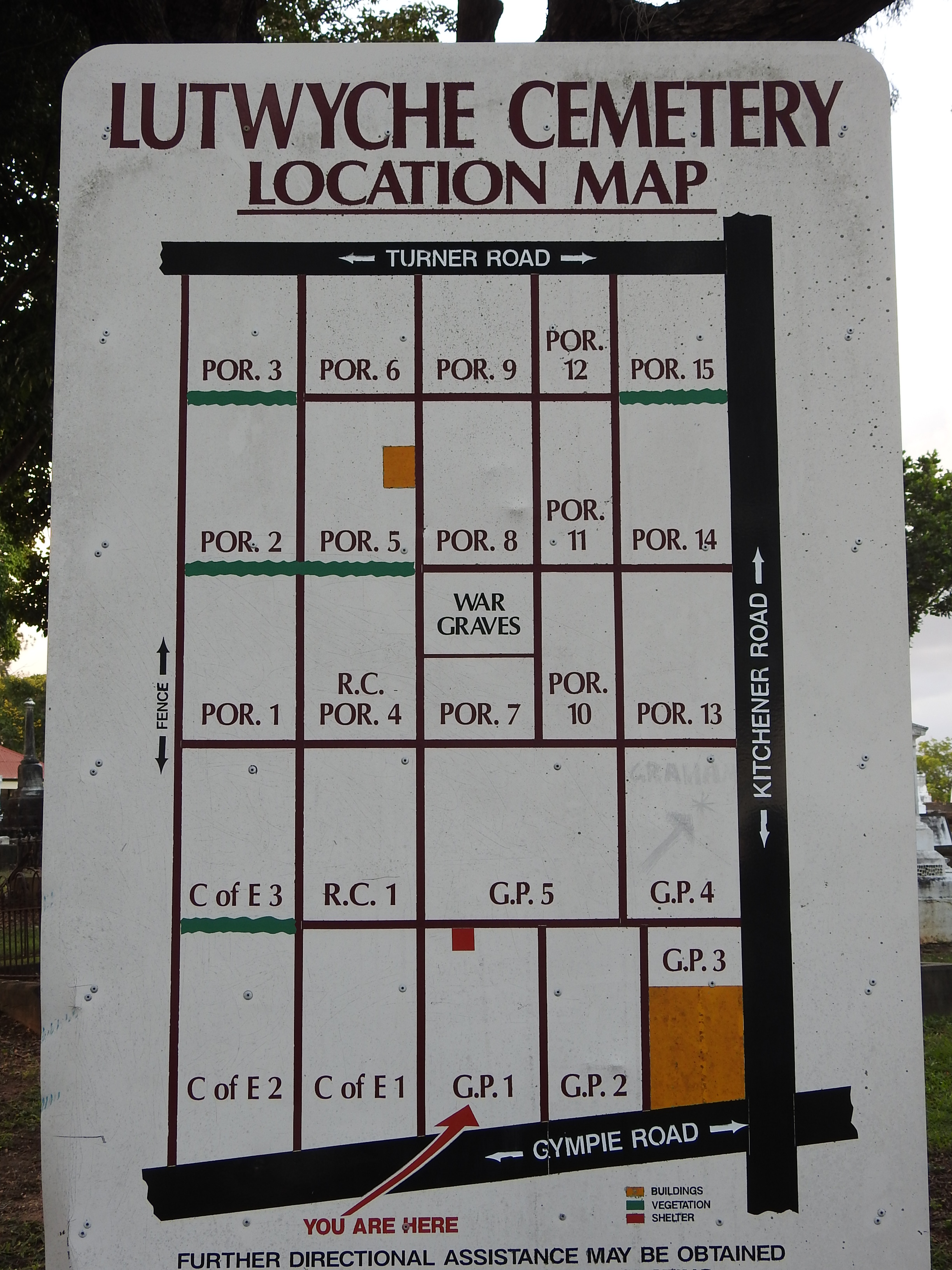
Cemetery map (2021).

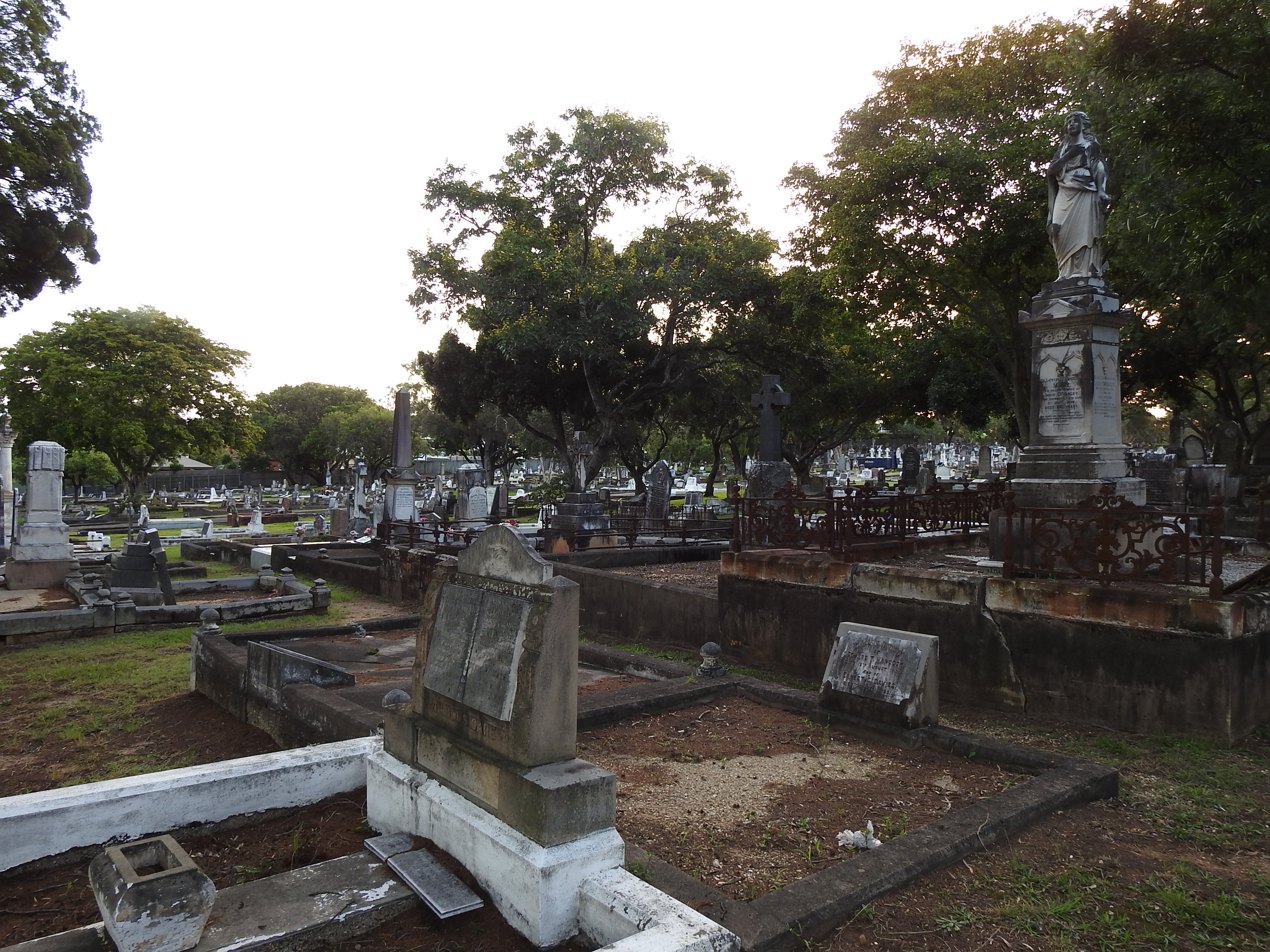
Cemetery portion close to Gympie Road, looking south-south-west (2021).

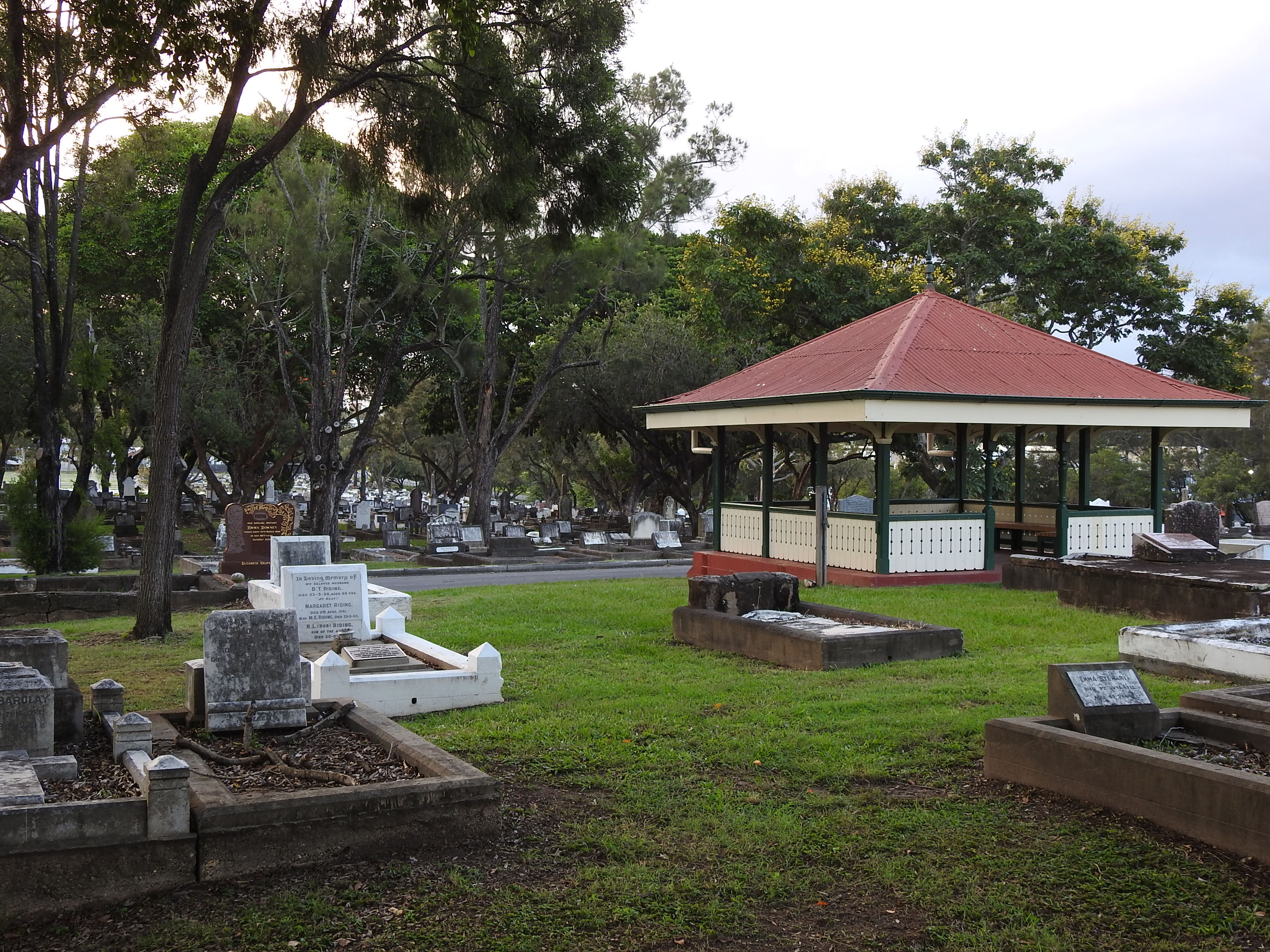
Shelter near Gympie Road entrance (2021).

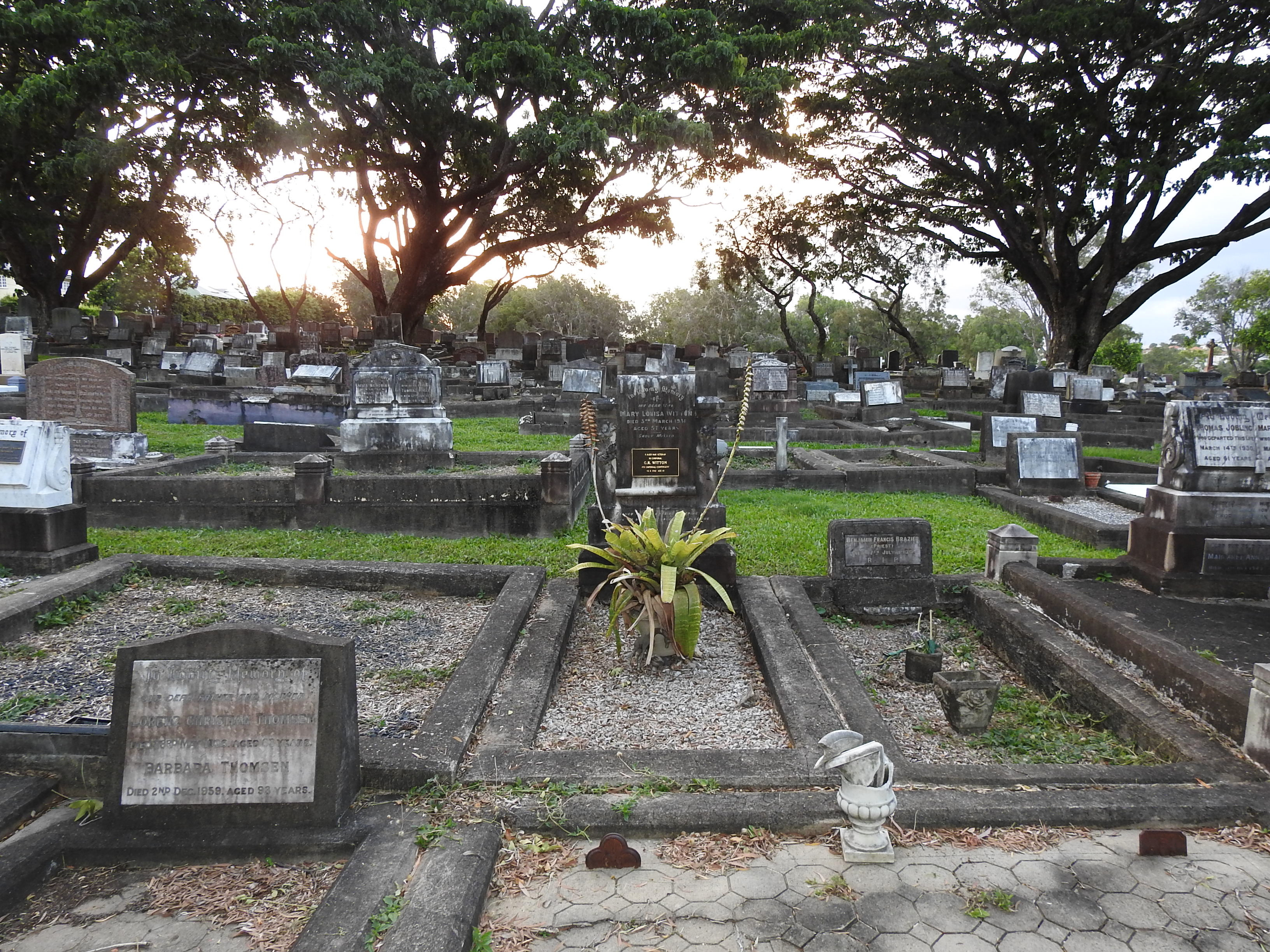
Grave of George Ramsdale Witton, Boer veteran (2021).

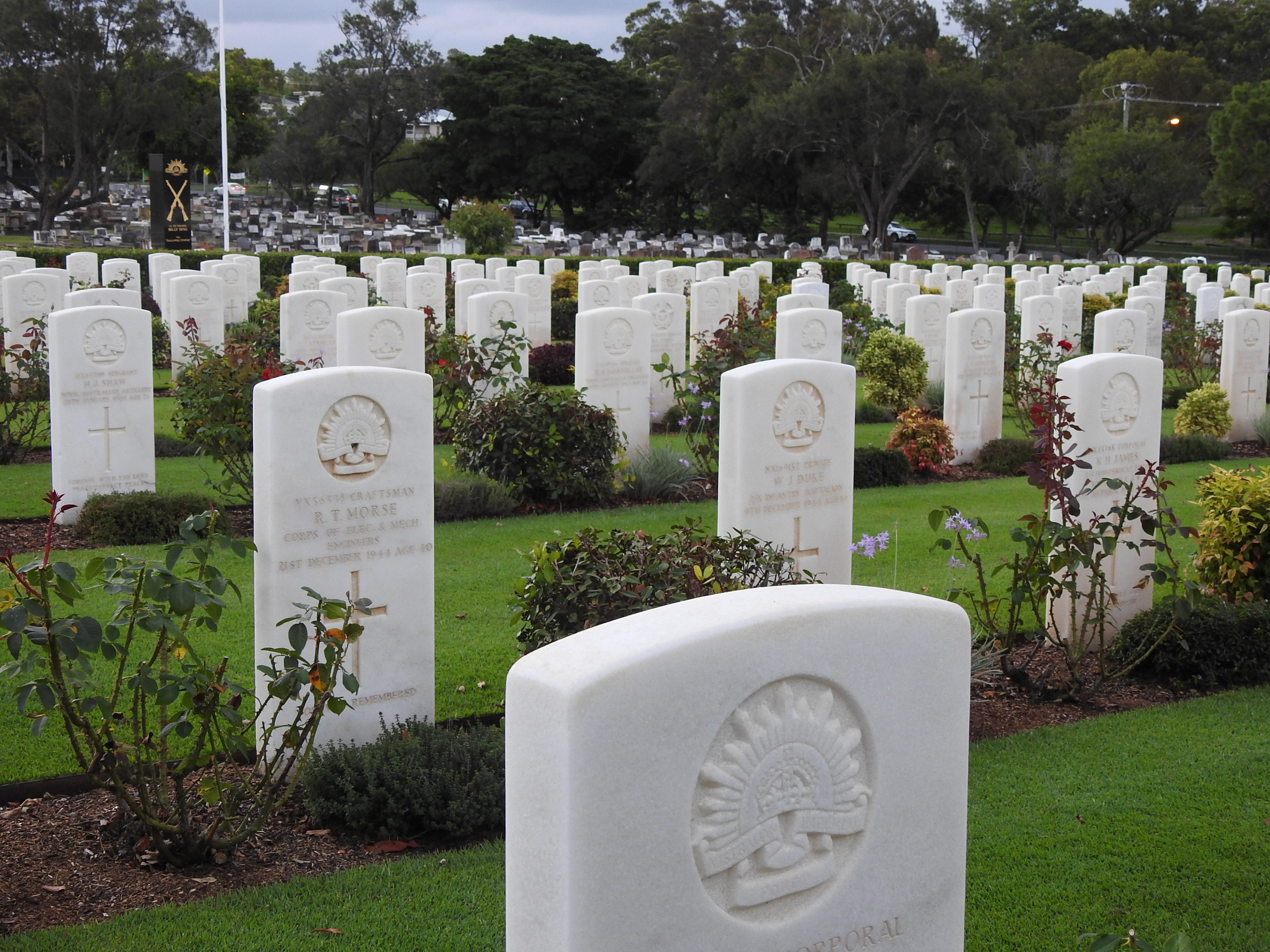
Commonwealth war grave headstones, looking north-west (2021).

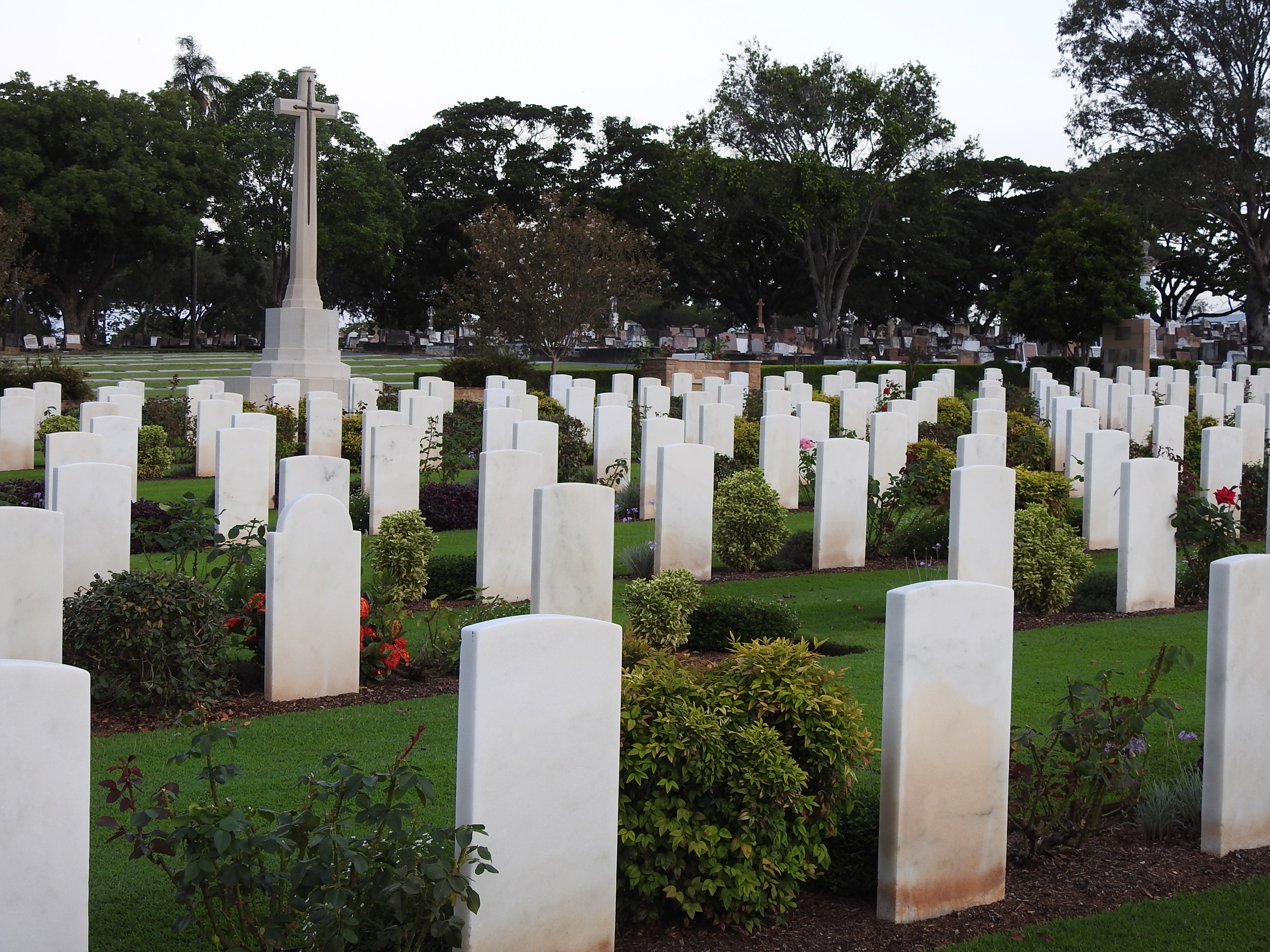
Commonwealth war grave headstones and the Cross of Sacrifice, looking south-east (2021).

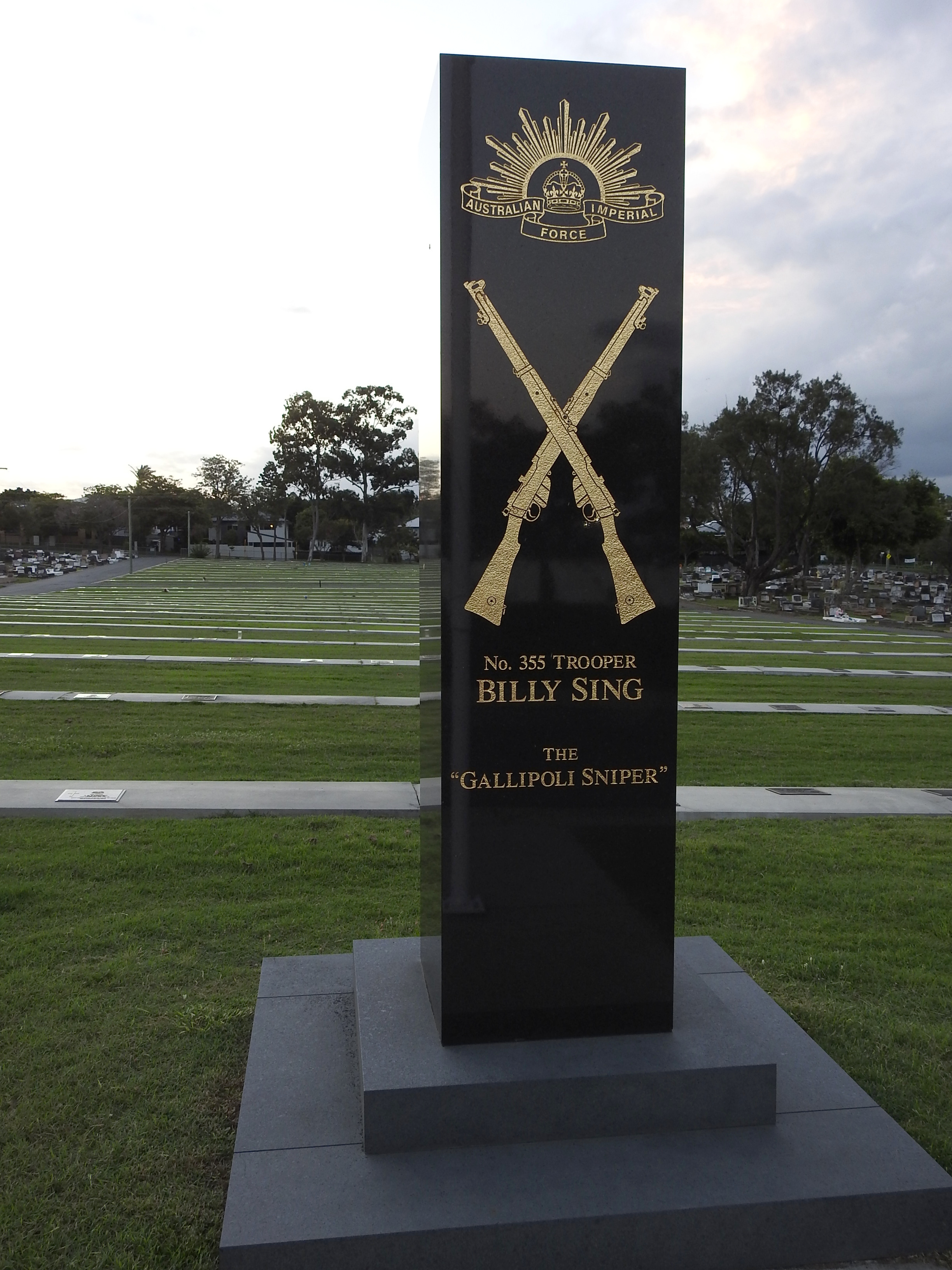
Billy Sing monument (2021).

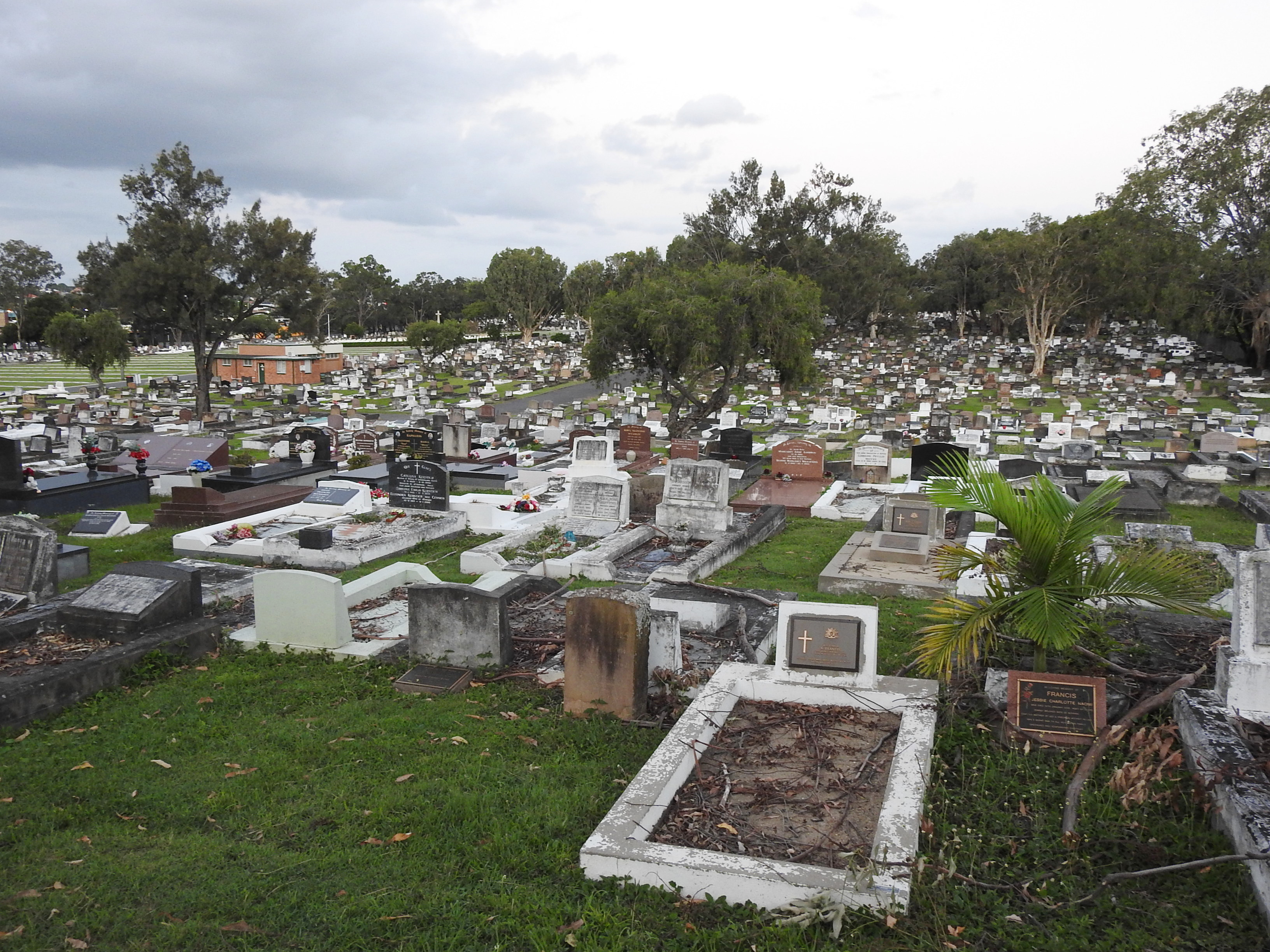
Looking east-north-east from Turner Road across the cemetery (2021).
