= Alexander Kennedy (colonist) =

Scottish colonist in Queensland, Australia (1837–1936)

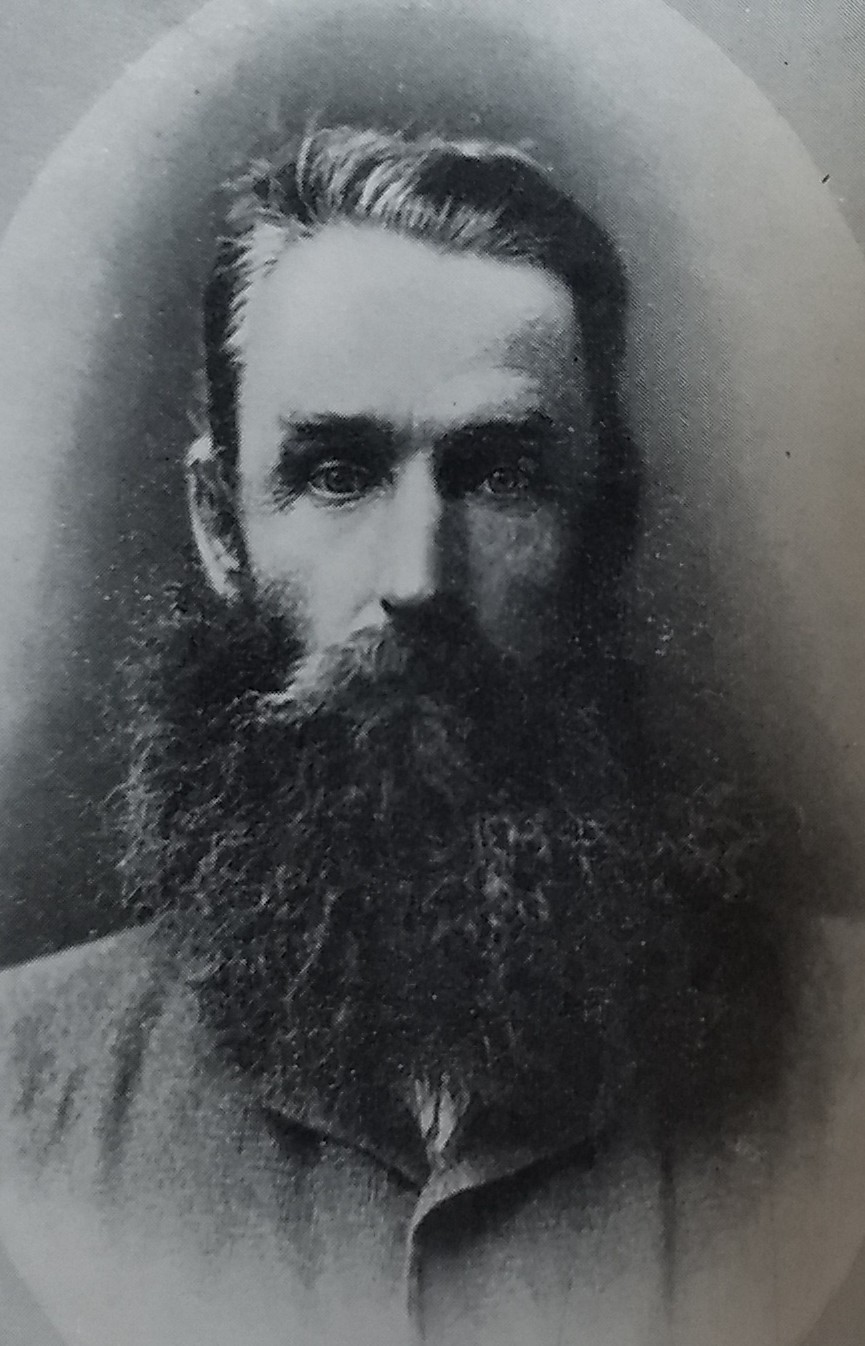
Kennedy c. 1880

Alexander Kennedy (11 November 1837 – 12 April 1936) was a Scottish colonist who was at the forefront of the British occupation of the Cloncurry region in Queensland, Australia. He established large cattle stations around Cloncurry and participated in several massacres of Aboriginal Australians who were resident to this area. Kennedy was also involved in the creation of the copper mining industry in this region. In later life he became interested in aviation and was a founding investor and director of the Qantas airline company. Kennedy became the first passenger to fly on a regular air service route for the Qantas airline.

== Early life ==
Alexander Kennedy was born in Dunkeld, Scotland in 1837 to parents John Kennedy and Christina Duff. As an adolescent, he worked as a farm labourer on the nearby Glen Ogle estate. At the age of 23, he signed up to a migration scheme that facilitated the emigration of Scottish locals to the British colony of Queensland.

== Central Queensland ==
Kennedy arrived at port of Gladstone, Queensland in 1861. He found work on sheep stations located on the Dawson River and later at Wealwandangie. He was tasked with overseeing blackbirded South Sea Islander labourers whom he thrashed with a stockwhip when they refused to work. When the wool industry collapsed in the early 1870s, Kennedy attempted to grow sugarcane on a property near Rockhampton. This also failed and Kennedy returned to managing and purchasing sheep stations, this time near the town of Tambo. In 1876 he decided to sell out of the area with the view of establishing cattle stations in the far north-west of Queensland, which was yet to be colonised by the British.

== Cloncurry region ==
In 1878, Kennedy with his family and business partners, drove a large mob of cattle 1,127 kilometres from Rockhampton to his newly selected property on Suleiman Creek located between Boulia and Cloncurry. Aboriginal Australians living in the region immediately began defending their lands by killing four cattlemen at Woonamo waterhole on Suleiman Creek. Armed groups of Native Police and British settlers, including Kennedy, went on a number of punitive expeditions after this event, where they "speedily shot" down native people as they encountered them. As was the custom at the time, Kennedy also took young Aboriginal boys from the native camps to utilise them as servants.

In this period Kennedy established a number of cattle stations in the Cloncurry area including Buckingham Downs, Noranside and Bushy Park. In 1882 he took up another large parcel of land to the northwest of Cloncurry which he named Calton Hills. Again he used force against local Aboriginals to acquire the land and led at least two missions to destroy local native camps. Kennedy quickly obtained a reputation for "shooting blacks" with the noted Cloncurry prospector and explorer Ernest Henry admonishing his actions. Despite his own efforts, Kennedy was not able to fully negate Aboriginal resistance at Calton Hills and travelled to Brisbane to meet with the Queensland Police Commissioner, David Thompson Seymour, where he demanded more action toward the removal of Aboriginal people from his property. Seymour promised Kennedy that more patrols would be undertaken by the Native Police in the region and also indicated that Kennedy could continue with his own punitive expeditions in the meantime.

Conflict continued with the local Kalkadoon and Maithakari people at Calton Hills, and in 1884 Kennedy's business partner, James White Powell, was killed. Kennedy, together with sub-inspector Frederic Urquhart of the Native Police and his troopers, conducted a large, month long punitive mission resulting in a number of massacres of Aboriginal people. Kennedy and Urquhart became close associates with Kennedy participating in later Native Police patrols which eventually subdued Aboriginal resistance in the area.

By 1892, Kennedy had established another cattle property near Cloncurry which he named Devoncourt and ran a total of nearly 30,000 head of cattle on his combined land holdings. He became a member of Cloncurry's first council while his son discovered a large copper deposit south of the town in 1897 which was sold to a mining company for £15,000. Kennedy continued his profitable enterprises in the region until he retired with his wife to Brisbane in 1919.

== Qantas ==
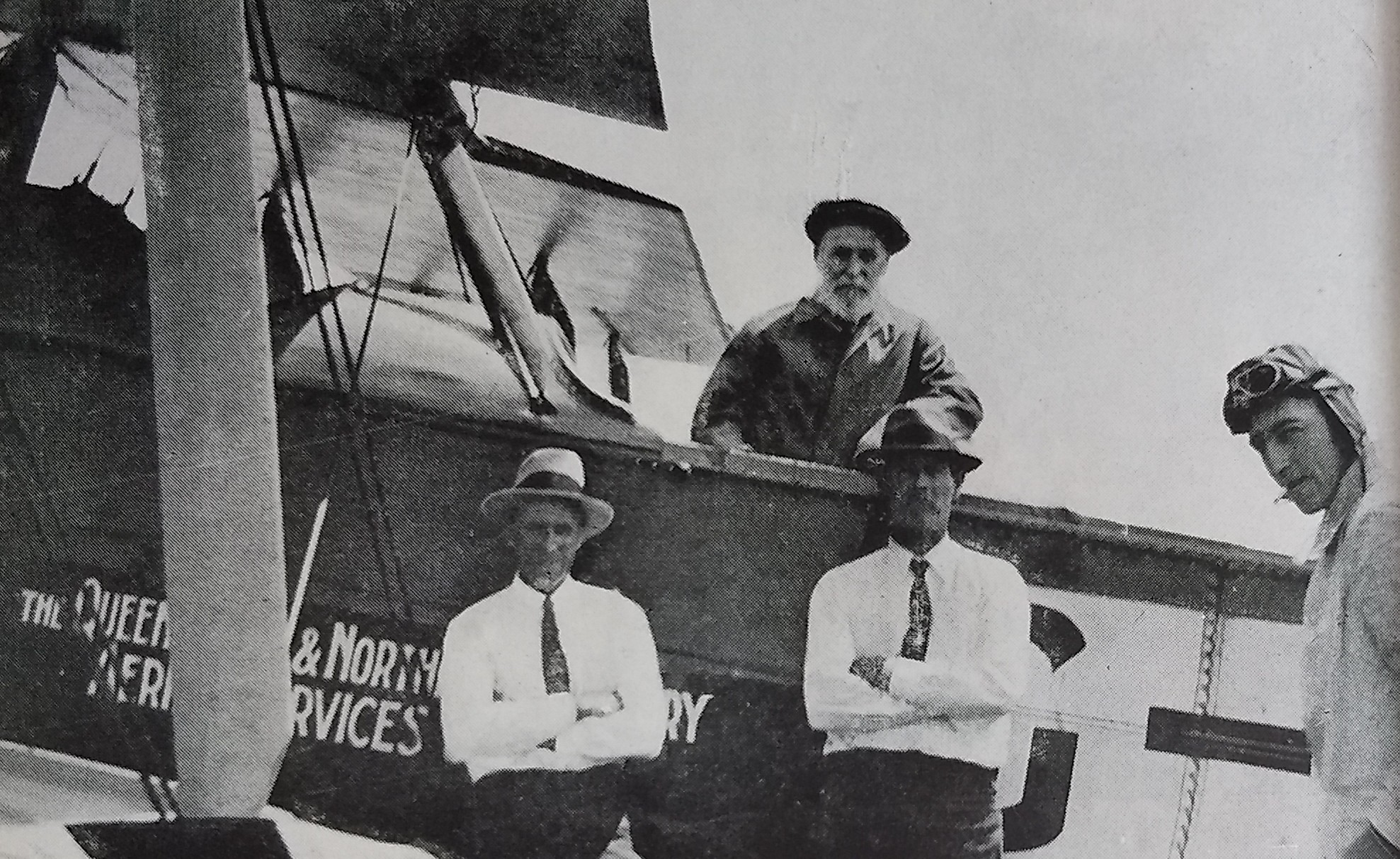
Alexander Kennedy (in aircraft) just before the first Qantas passenger flight

In later life, Kennedy became keenly interested in aviation and in 1920 he was convinced by Hudson Fysh and other founders of Qantas to become a provisional director and initial investor in the fledgling airline company. On 2 November 1922, at the age of 84, Kennedy became the first paying customer on a scheduled Qantas passenger service, flying from Longreach to Cloncurry.

== Death ==
Alexander Kennedy died in Brisbane on 12 April 1936. Kennedy's and his wife's ashes were transported by a Qantas aircraft from Brisbane to his Devoncourt property near Cloncurry where they were interred a monument.
