= Chelmer =

Chelmer may refer to the following places:

Australia

- Chelmer, Queensland, a suburb of Brisbane
  - Chelmer Police College, a heritage-listed former police barracks
  - Chelmer railway station
  - Chelmer Reach, a reach of the Brisbane River

England

- Chelmer Village, a suburb of Chelmsford, Essex
- River Chelmer, a river in Essex
