= Papua =

Papua may refer to:

- New Guinea, the world's second-largest island in the southwestern Pacific Ocean
- Western New Guinea, an Indonesian region comprising the western half of the island of New Guinea
  - Papua (province), an Indonesian province in the north coast of Western New Guinea
- Papua New Guinea, a country comprising the eastern half of the island of New Guinea
- Territory of Papua, former Australian external territory in southeastern New Guinea
- Southern Region, Papua New Guinea, officially known as Papua Region up to 2011

== Other uses ==
- Papua Beach, on the south Atlantic island of South Georgia
- Papua Island, off the north tip of the Antarctic Peninsula
- HMS Papua (K588), a British frigate in service in the Royal Navy from 1944 to 1945

== See also ==
- Papuan (disambiguation)
- West Papua (disambiguation)
- Papuasia, a bioregion containing Papua
