= Cliffside Apartments =

Apartment block in Brisbane, Queensland, Australia

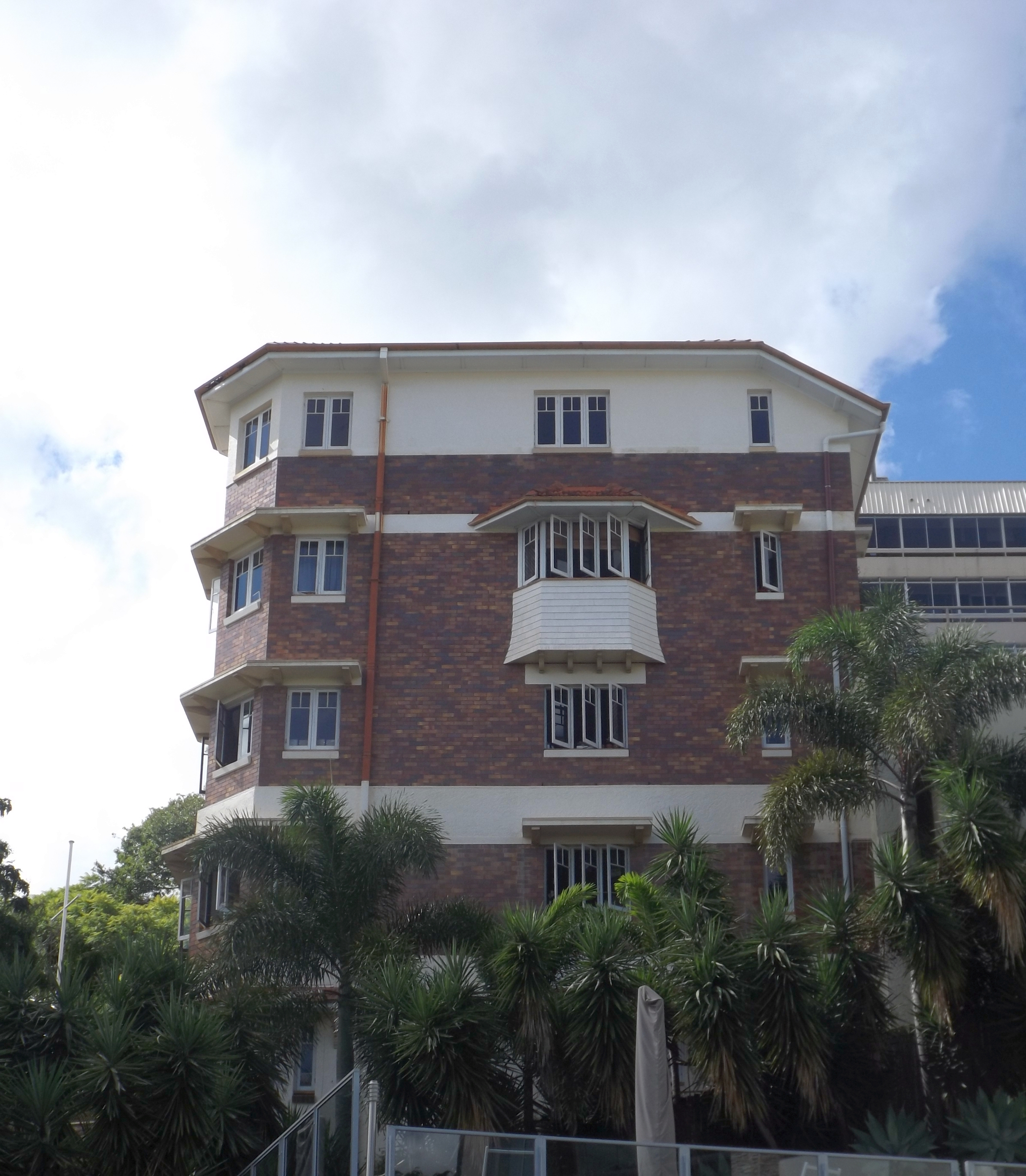
- Apartments in 2015

- Location within Queensland Location within Australia
- 27.4824°S 153.0316°E
- Location: 76 Lower River Terrace, Kangaroo Point, City of Brisbane, Queensland, Australia

History
- Design period: 1919–1930s (interwar period)
- Built: 1936–1937

Queensland Heritage Register
- Official name: Cliffside Apartments, Cliffside Flats
- Type: state heritage (built, landscape)
- Designated: 27 February 2004
- Reference no.: 601650
- Significant period: 1930s (fabric, historical)
- Significant components: garden/grounds, gate – entrance, terracing, wall/s – garden, garden – bed/s, laundry / wash house, steps/stairway, views from, paving, residential accommodation – flat/s, furniture/fittings, lawn/s, garden edging/balustrades/planter boxes, views to, flagpole/flagstaff, trees/plantings, residential accommodation – caretaker's quarters, garage

Cliffside Apartments is a heritage-listed apartment block at 76 Lower River Terrace, Kangaroo Point, City of Brisbane, Queensland, Australia. It was built from 1936 to 1937. It is also known as Cliffiside Flats. It was added to the Queensland Heritage Register on 27 February 2004.

== History ==
Cliffside Apartments, a five-storey masonry building prominently located on the cliffs at Kangaroo Point, was built in 1936–37 to the design of architect and engineer Ronald Martin Wilson. The building is sited on two blocks originally part of an early land purchase by John and George Harris in 1855. The land passed through the hands of several owners until it was purchased by Mrs Doris Regina Booth at the beginning of 1930. At the time that Mrs Booth bought the site it was a sheer cliff of solid porphyry with a railway and wharves at its base.

Mrs Booth was born in 1895 in a house named Cliffside next to the railway gates on the Kangaroo Point Cliffs. She married Captain Charles Booth in 1919 and together they travelled to New Guinea in 1920. Mrs Booth distinguished herself by breaking convention and securing her own miner's right and then becoming a licensed recruiter of labour. She was the only resident white woman in the Bulolo Valley and stayed there alone (in her house, also named Cliffside) while her husband prospected at Edie Creek. From September 1926 to January 1927 she organized and managed a racially segregated bush hospital to control a dysentery epidemic. She received an O.B.E for this work in 1928. Later that year in London, she recorded these and other adventures in her book, Mountains, Gold and Cannibals, which was written with the assistance of M. O'Dwyer.

Mrs Booth returned to New Guinea in 1929 and gradually wrested control over the family business affairs from her husband, from whom she separated in 1932. The Booths became embroiled in an acrimonious court case when in 1933 Charles Booth sued in the Central Court of the Territory of New Guinea for restitution of property. The case was a test case as no mandated territory law explicitly safeguarded married women's property rights. Judge F. B. Phillips held that British and Australian Acts passed before 1921 superseded the common law notion of male control of joint property and gave Mrs Booth the verdict. The judgement was upheld in a subsequent appeal in the High Court of Australia and territorial law was amended by the Status of Married Women Ordinance 1935–36. Booth returned to prospecting and Mrs Booth went on to become a successful mine manager and company director and amongst other achievements was appointed as the sole woman member of the first and second Legislative Councils of Papua and New Guinea in 1951–57.

The construction of Cliffside in 1936–37 attested to Doris Booth's extraordinary independent effort and acumen. After securing the land adjacent to her childhood home, Mrs Booth granted power of attorney to her sister Mrs Selma Dore who took responsibility for supervising the design and construction of the building. Work on the ambitious project began in late 1935 when R. Martin Wilson began his first drawings. Wilson was both an architect and engineer and it is possible that he was commissioned on the basis of his engineering expertise, a skill that would obviously be required on this job. However, both Wilson and Doris Booth had close connections with Burns Philp & Company and it is possible that this connection brought them together. Burns Philp had financed the Booths' first foray into the goldfields of New Guinea and Wilson and his father had provided extensive architectural services to the company.

A tender notice appeared in the Architects and Builders Journal of Queensland in June 1936, and George Mitchell's tender was accepted in July. A Special Note in the Bill of Quantities stated that "Contractors are advised to visit and inspect the site and satisfy themselves as to the nature of excavations to be carried out, as it is anticipated rock will be met with. No blasting will be allowed. All excavations in rock to be done by the use of an air compressor." Wilson went on to specify that all rock and fill from the excavations was to be re-used to form terraces, steps and paving.

Cliffside was considered the height of modernity when it was opened in June 1937. The Telegraph reported on 7 June that "Cliffside Flats at River Terrace, Kangaroo Point, have given Brisbane an example of the most advanced flat design in Australia." Although the practice of converting houses to flats was well established in Brisbane, the development of the purpose-designed flat was slower in Brisbane than in other parts of the country. The Telegraph described that "Until quite recently the flat-habit was looked on by Brisbane with mixed feelings of disfavour and doubt, but now the general desire for easier living, coupled with the acute problem of obtaining competent domestics, is spreading the flat-habit over a wider field." The article went on to expound the virtues of properly designed and planned flats, of which Cliffside was the foremost example.

Cliffside was equipped with all modern conveniences including built-in furniture, dining nooks and serveries, electric refrigerators, electric hot water, water softening and incinerator and laundry chutes. The design of the building maximised privacy, views, light and the flow of air. Each of the eight flats had their own private entrance and floors were sound-proofed. The slope of the site was used to advantage so that no more than one and a half flights of stairs had to be scaled to gain access to any one of them. Plumbing connections were housed in a special duct with access from outside the building so that maintenance and repairs could take place without bothering the tenants. A caretaker's quarters was part of the original design, as was the provision of lock-up garages. The building was designed in the popular interwar style of English Revival or Tudor Revival with elements such as eaves and bay windows having a half-timbered appearance. As the promotional literature stated, Cliffside was "the newest, the best and the most attractive offering in Brisbane".

At the opening of Cliffside on 10 June, Alderman Louis Luckins announced that the Brisbane City Council was introducing new bylaws to regulate the standards of construction and design of flat buildings, emphasising, however, that not everyone would be able to achieve the "heights of quality embodied in Cliffside". These ordinances were ratified by the Executive Council of Brisbane City Council in August 1937 and dealt with issues such as plot ratios, sanitation and fire rating. 1936–37 was the peak time for interwar flat construction in Queensland. In the following years, construction decreased due to the uncertain investment climate created by the threat of war in Europe as well as the refusal of banking institutions to lend on flat constructions.

Cliffside is a fine example of the work of R. Martin Wilson and demonstrates his skill in the fields of both architecture and engineering. Born in Brisbane in 1886, he was the son of architect Alexander Brown Wilson and studied and worked with his father from 1902–8. He received a Bachelor of Engineering at the University of Queensland in 1915 and won the Walter and Eliza Hill Travelling Fellowship allowing him to study architectural engineering in the United States from 1915 to 1917. He went on to London and studied at the Architectural Association as well as completing a town planning course at London University. From 1919, he lectured in engineering at University of Queensland and was the first person to gain a Masters in Engineering at that institution.

He practised with his father as Alex B. and R. Martin Wilson, Architects and Architectural Engineers, Brisbane from 1920, becoming a registered architect in 1929. He was active in professional bodies such as the Institute of Architects and the Town Planning Association. Alex Wilson retired in 1928 and R. M. Wilson was later joined by his son, Blair in the firm of R. M. Wilson and Son.

Mrs Booth retired to Brisbane in 1960. She sold Cliffside in 1966 to Giuseppe and Angelo Angelino, whose family company retains ownership of the building.

== Description ==
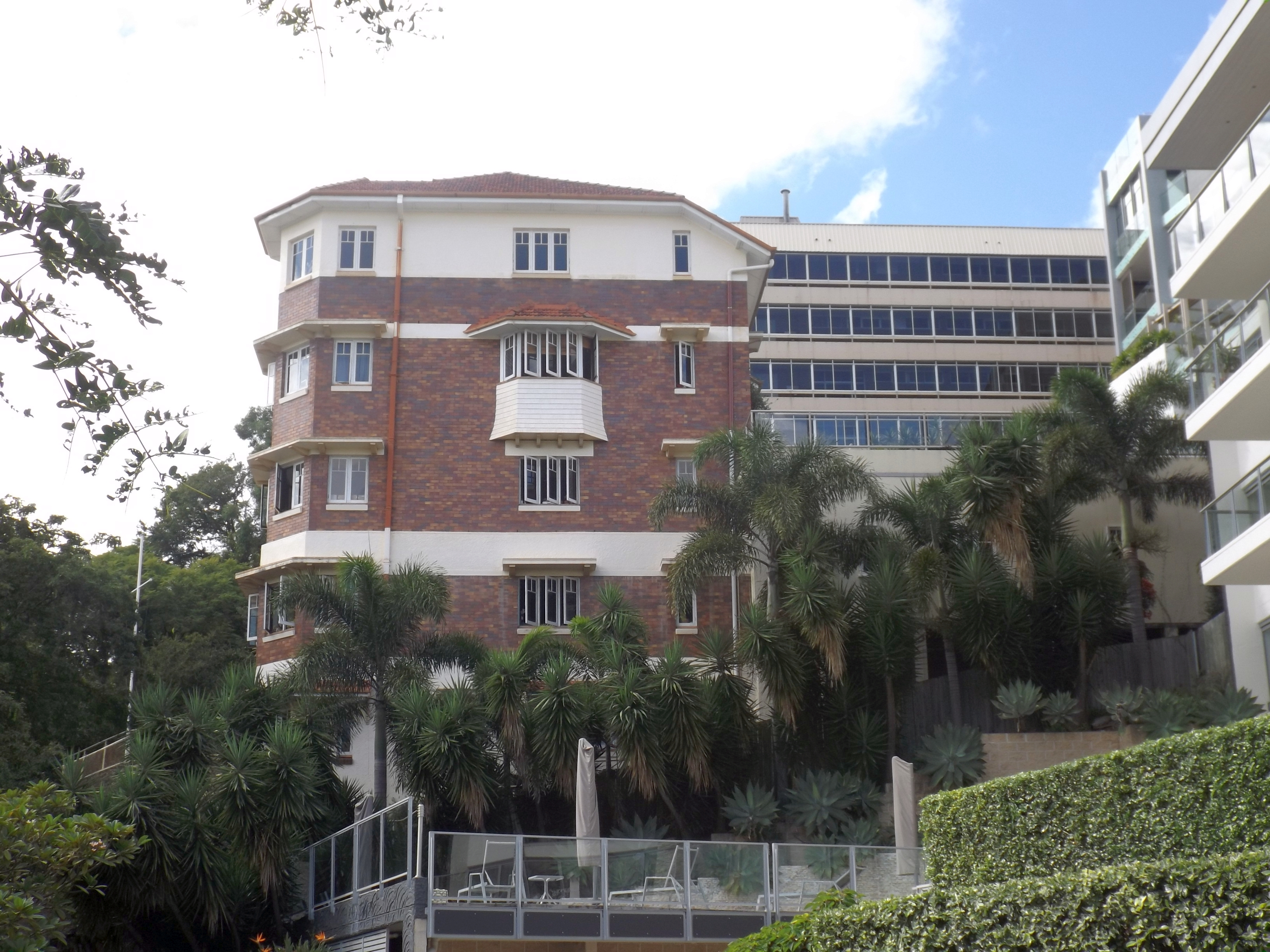
Building in 2015

Cliffside Apartments is a five-story, masonry building located on the cliff at Kangaroo Point overlooking Garden's Point and the City Botanic Gardens. The building is of load-bearing cavity brick construction finished alternately in face brickwork and cement render. Concrete construction is used in retaining walls and car parking structures on the southern side of the building. The northern elevation facing the Brisbane River is dominated by large hexagonal bay windows projecting from the corners of the building. This elevation also has a number of smaller, faceted bay windows and a central, decorated bay window spanning two floors and housing a large sign inscribed "Cliffside".

The large hipped roof is clad in terracotta tiles with a small brick chimney from the former incinerator. Timber casement windows with concrete sills are to be found throughout the building and many have concrete shades supported by concrete corbels projecting from the lintel. The main entrance to the building is from Lower River Terrace and is marked with an iron entry gate. Steps and paths edged with Brisbane tuff drawn from the site encircle the building and lead to the various front doors of individual flats. There are a number of types of stonework in the garden including low, coursed walls of squared rubble construction and random rubble walls as well as garden beds edged with shards of vertical stone. An expanse of lawn overlooks the river on the level of the first floor flats and laundry area and is retained with a large concrete and tuff sloping wall. The lawn is fenced and has a flagpole, planting includes a jacaranda and mature frangipani.

The building contains seven flats, six of which were designed with two bedrooms and one single bedroom flat. The former caretaker's quarters is located under the garages, within a concrete framed building with tall concrete posts. Each of the flats have their own front doors. Entry doors are high mid-rail timber with decorative leadlight upper panels, some having complimentary windows located close by. Back doors are located on the southern elevation, accessed by landings off a central dogleg stair housed within a timber, fibro and lattice stairwell.

The interiors of the flats are characterised by dark, stained timber panelling, plate rails and joinery with white decorative plaster ceilings, ornate cornices and dark, polished hardwood floors. Features include a number of built-in storage units and a kitchen-dining room servery with leadlight windows. The kitchens have basic timber joinery and dining nooks of two bench seats and a table. Bathrooms have terrazzo floors and original tiling around the combined shower and bath.

A shared laundry area is situated on the ground floor towards the eastern end of the building. On the southern side of the building are two car parking structures. A timber and fibrous-cement shed is located above the caretakers flat on the western end of the site. On the eastern side, a concrete structure accommodates two carpark spaces with car parking above.

== Heritage listing ==
Cliffside Apartments was listed on the Queensland Heritage Register on 27 February 2004 having satisfied the following criteria.

The place is important in demonstrating the evolution or pattern of Queensland's history.

Cliffside Apartments is important for demonstrating the pattern of residential development in Brisbane during the interwar period when large numbers of flat buildings were constructed. The increase in the number of flats in the mid 1930s demonstrates the rapid growth of Brisbane's population and the subsequent high demand for accommodation due to a shortage of housing. It also reflects changing community attitudes towards new forms of housing. The principal investor in Cliffside was a woman, illustrative of the growing connection between women and property investment and flats in the interwar period.

The place is important in demonstrating the principal characteristics of a particular class of cultural places.

Cliffside Apartments demonstrates the principal characteristics of a substantial, architect-designed, interwar apartment building including features such as built-in storage, dining nooks, caretaker's quarters and lock-up garages that are particularly characteristic of early purpose-designed flats. Cliffside is a prominent and highly intact example of the domestic work of Brisbane architect RM Wilson.

The place is important because of its aesthetic significance.

Cliffside has aesthetic and architectural significance. Occupying a dramatic and difficult site, Cliffside's superior standards of design and finish represent a highpoint in the quality and resolution of flat design in Brisbane. The building has strong landmark qualities deriving from its prominent siting at Kangaroo Point between the South Brisbane and Town Reaches of the Brisbane River overlooking the city and Botanic Gardens.
