= Bulolo Valley =

Geographical area

The Bulolo Valley is a geographical area in Bulolo District, Morobe Province, Papua New Guinea. The Bulolo River and its tributaries form the extent of the valley before it meets with the Markham Valley.

== History ==
Gold mining by Papuans in the Bulolo region of New Guinea

Gold mining and forestry form the main industries in the valley.
