= West Papuan =

West Papuan may refer to:

- someone or something of, from, or related to, West Papua
- West Papuan languages, a group of languages
