= St Lucia Uniting Church =

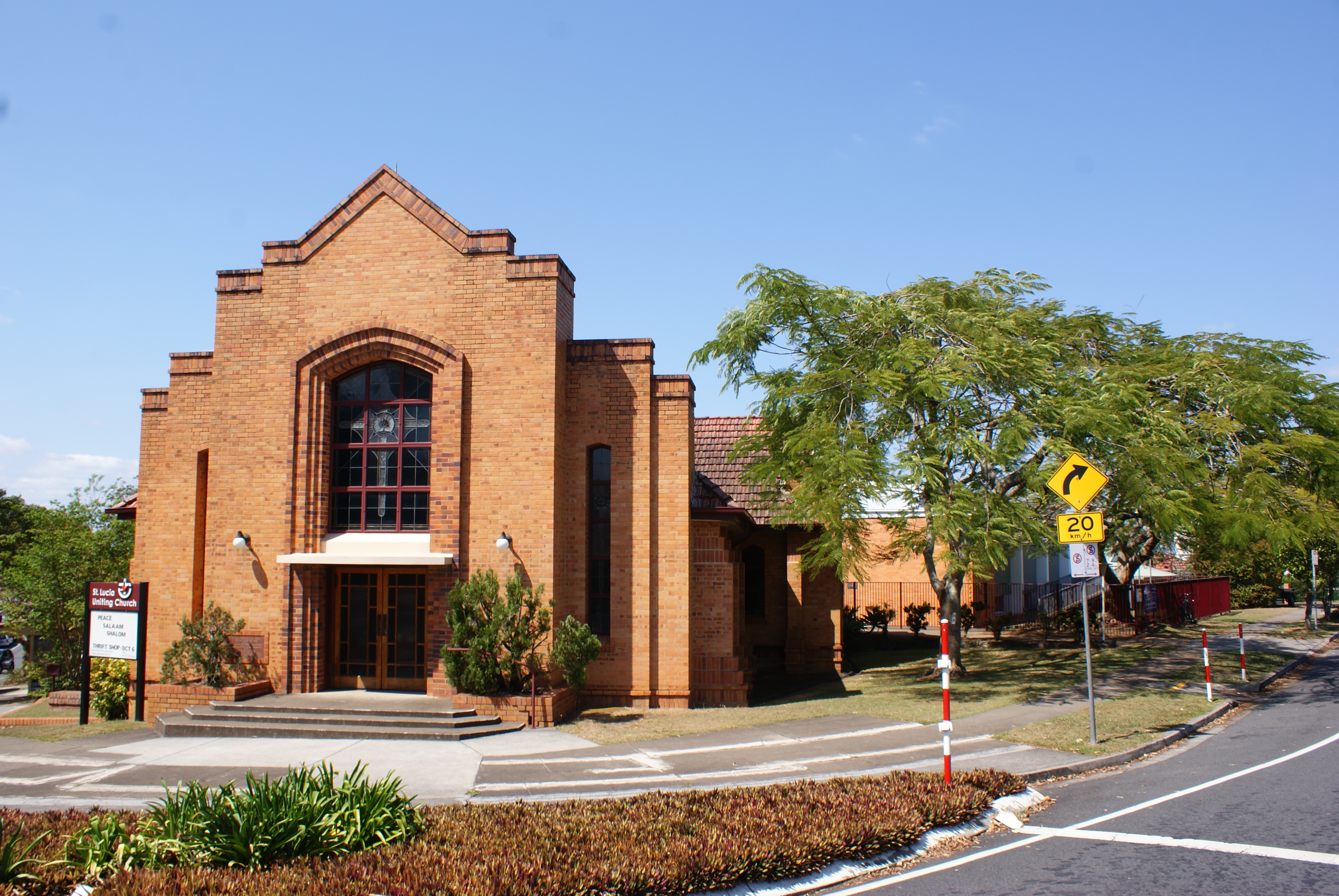
- St Lucia Uniting Church on approach
- St Lucia Uniting Church
- 27°30′04″S 152°59′45″E
- Address: 7 Hawken Drive, St Lucia, City of Brisbane, Queensland
- Country: Australia
- Denomination: Uniting (since 1977)
- Previous denomination: Presbyterian {1952 – 1977)
- Website: stluciaunitingchurch.org.au

History
- Former name: St Lucia Presbyterian Church
- Status: Church
- Founded: May 1951
- Founder: Presbyterian Church of Queensland

Architecture
- Functional status: Active
- Architect: Ronald Martin Wilson
- Architectural type: Church
- Completed: 1952

Administration
- Parish: St Lucia

Brisbane Heritage Register
- Official name: St Lucia Presbyterian Church
- Type: Local heritage
- Reference no.: 1675
- Builders: J. Hutchinson & Sons

The St Lucia Uniting Church is a heritage-listed Uniting church at 7 Hawken Drive, St Lucia, City of Brisbane, Queensland, Australia. Built in 1952, it was designed by Ronald Martin Wilson. The church, formerly known as St Lucia Presbyterian Church, was originally commissioned for the St Lucia congregation of Presbyterians, subsequently becoming the property of the Uniting Church. This church was the first substantial commission awarded to R. Martin Wilson after World War II. The church is listed on the Brisbane Heritage Register.

== History ==
Before the commission for this church during 1949, the Presbyterian community of St Lucia were forced to worship at the nearby Toowong Presbyterian Church. As the congregation grew in size it became apparent that a church for the St Lucia community became necessary. During the late 1940s, many young Presbyterians from the local area received religious instruction at a room within the local primary school, Ironside State School. However during August 1947, the State Moderator of the Presbyterian Church, Rt. Rev. Norman Leslie Douglas Webster, dedicated a relocated army hut as a place of worship for the St Lucia congregation. While Rev. James Frederick McKay would preach from this space, the army hut was still considered an extension of the Toowong Church. Nevertheless, the Presbyterian Church of Queensland did consider this a temporary resolution to the needs of a growing congregation and thus it was revealed that plans were to be drawn up for a permanent church. This church, with a budget of £6000, was to be located on two adjoining allotments on Hawken Drive in St Lucia, which was proximate to the temporary place of worship.

== The architect and the church ==
Ronald Martin Wilson (1886–1967), the primary architect for the Brisbane-based family practice of R. Martin Wilson, Architect and Architectural Engineers; was an Honorary Architect to the Presbyterian Church of Queensland like his father before him. The Wilson family had relocated to a home in St Lucia in 1937 and were among the members of the congregate at the nearby Toowong Presbyterian Church. The combination of Wilson's close ties to the community and his standing within the Presbyterian church made him an appropriate choice as project architect for the church. In an interview with his son, Blair Mansfield Wilson (1930- ), it was revealed that commissions in Queensland were awarded based on community ties and friendships, and were not a competition between a series of different entries by other firms. Wilson had also demonstrated an aptitude towards ecclesiastical design, with his design for the Ithaca Presbyterian Church of 1927 at La Trobe Terrace in Ithaca (now Paddington) being a source of inspiration for the architectural firm of the church at St Lucia. This church was also the first major ecclesiastical work to be completed by the firm after the death of Wilson's father Alexander Brown Wilson’s in 1938, as well as after the completion of World War II. Over the course of the next few decades, Wilson also completed a variety of other commissions for the Presbyterian Church of Queensland, including the design of the W. R. Black Home for Girls, the Blackheath Home for Boys and the ‘Hometown’ Home for Elderly Men. As such, this church represents a significant stage of the firm’s work after the war.

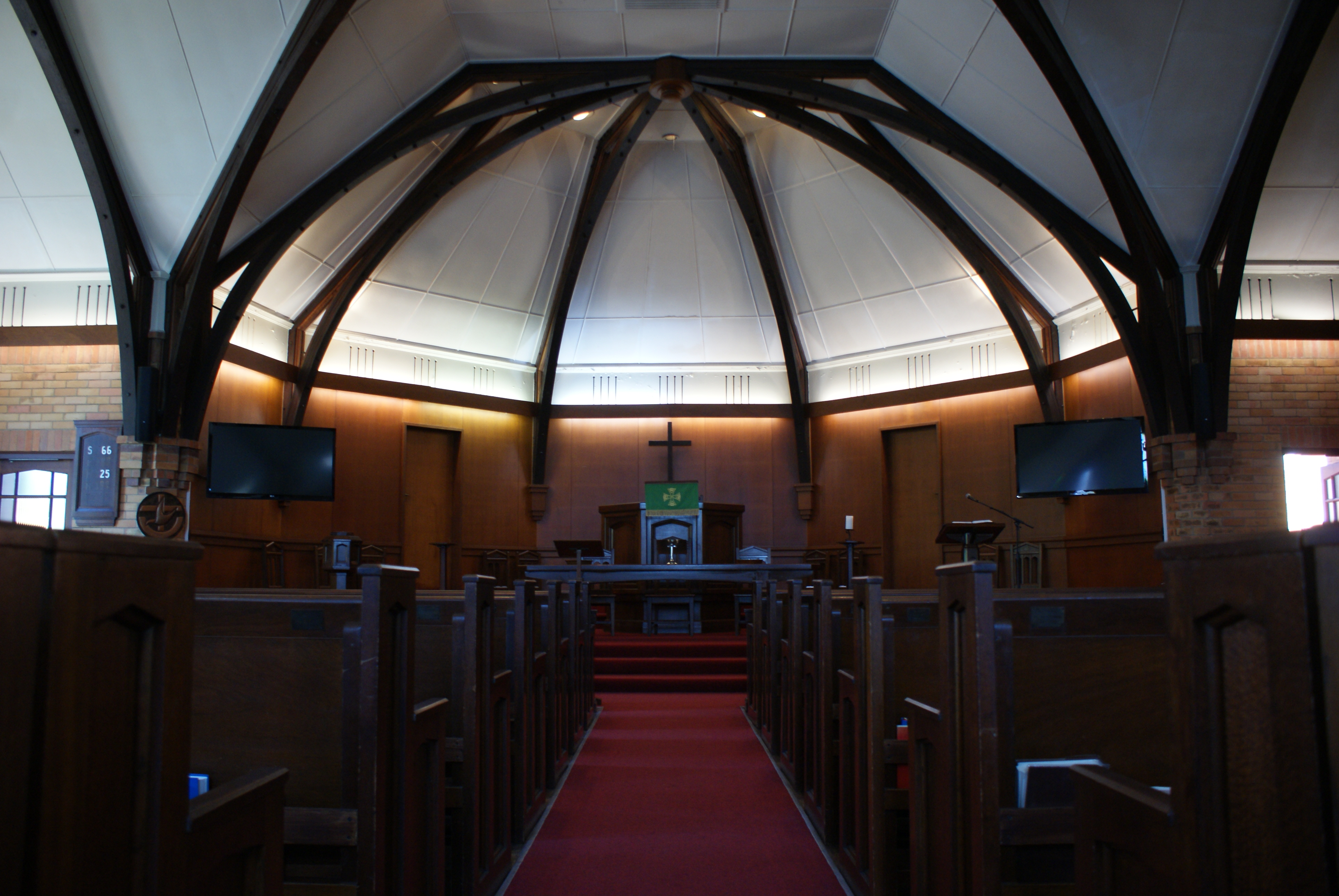
The church interior

== Architectural style ==
Presbyterian architecture in Queensland is often the result of slavishly following older ecclesiastical traditions. By contrast, the St Lucia Uniting Church makes certain steps towards addressing the needs of a Presbyterian congregation while overcoming the scarcity of construction materials after World War II. Wilson's son Blair has acknowledged that despite the relative rarity of bricks and other construction materials, his father was able to source them for the church despite their impact on the efficiency of the church construction. This tradition of brick construction resonates in later work by his son Blair, such as the Kindler Memorial Theatre and the La Boite Theatre later in the 1970s. In responding to the needs of the Presbyterian congregation, Wilson made concessions towards two key considerations of the Presbyterian faith. Firstly, the Presbyterian faith is one of equality, and thus the design produced by Wilson is based around a pulpit that is negligibly raised above the level of the congregation creating equality between every individual of the church. There is also little ornamentation added to the pulpit. Secondly, the ability to hear the word of God clearly during sermons is crucial, and thus the resultant church is based around a short Latin cross plan form with the transepts housing the organ and choir. This more intimate scale of church, combined with naturally dark finish of the interior brickwork, creates a place of worship where the congregation should feel intimately linked to the minister and sermon. As thanks for his work on the church, the congregation also constructed a dedication stone thanking Wilson.

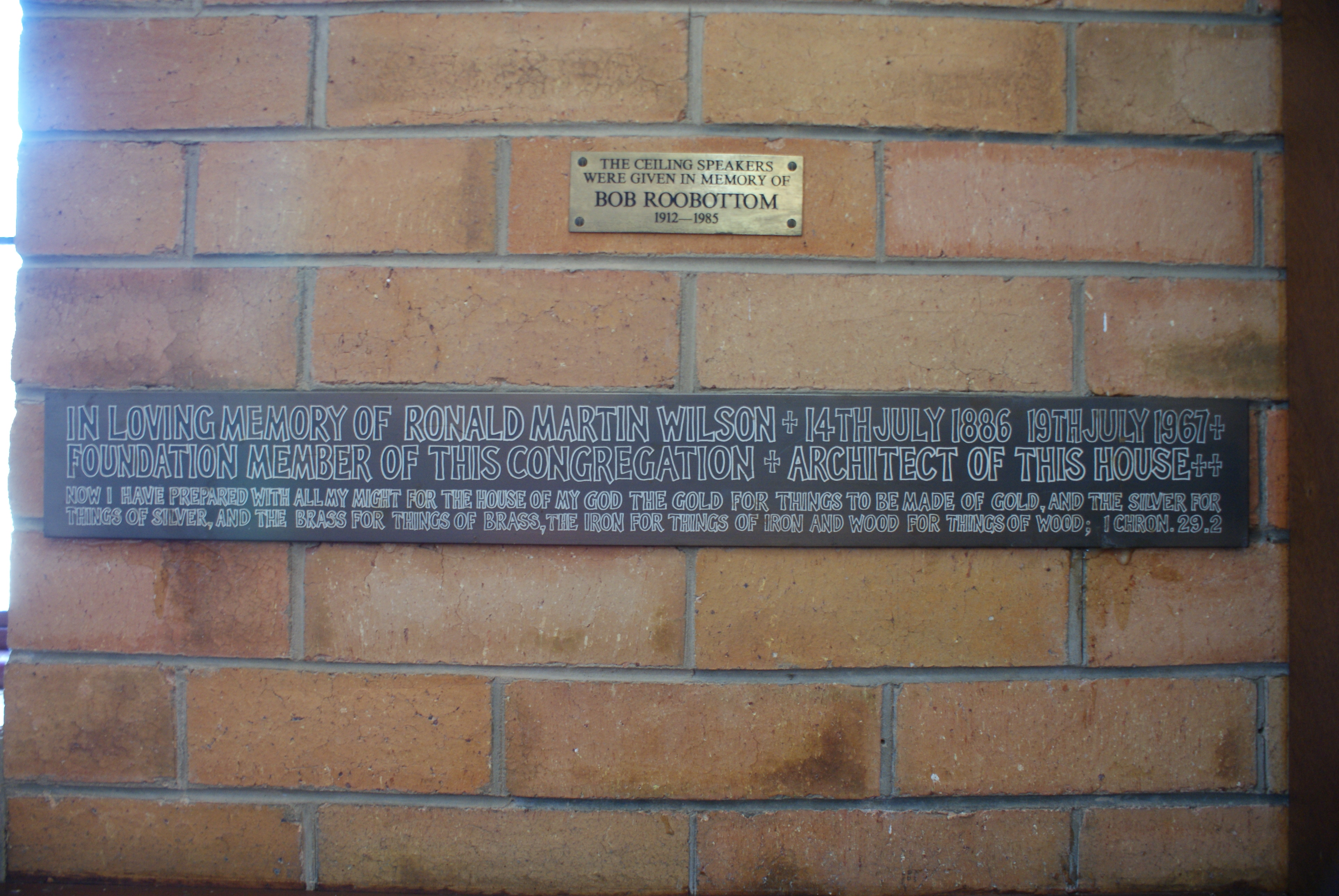
The church dedication stone

== Community engagement ==
As with many ecclesiastical works, the relationship between the local congregation or community and the architecture is often a close one. Even before the design and construction of the current St Lucia Uniting Church, the congregation took their involvement in their place of worship seriously. It was noted that when the army hut was to be moved from its home in Enoggera in the northern suburbs of Brisbane to St Lucia, many of the members of the congregate volunteer to aid the process. While the congregation were unable to assist in the construction, Mansergh Shaw, Professor of Engineering at the nearby University of Queensland, built the belfry in his spare time and later donated it to the new church during 1953. The tower no longer remains. The church was very significant to the community. At the official opening ceremony, more than 150 people were forced to sit outside the building as the interior was packed to capacity.

== The modern church ==
Since its construction during the 1950s, the St Lucia Presbyterian Church has passed into the ownership of the Uniting Church of Australia. The church has since been rebranded as the St Lucia Uniting Church, with the current minister, Reverend Mandy Smith, preaching every Sunday. While the congregation may have shifted since its construction, the church community is still closely linked to the local Ironside State School and teaches during the weekly religious education programme.
