= Ronald Martin Wilson =

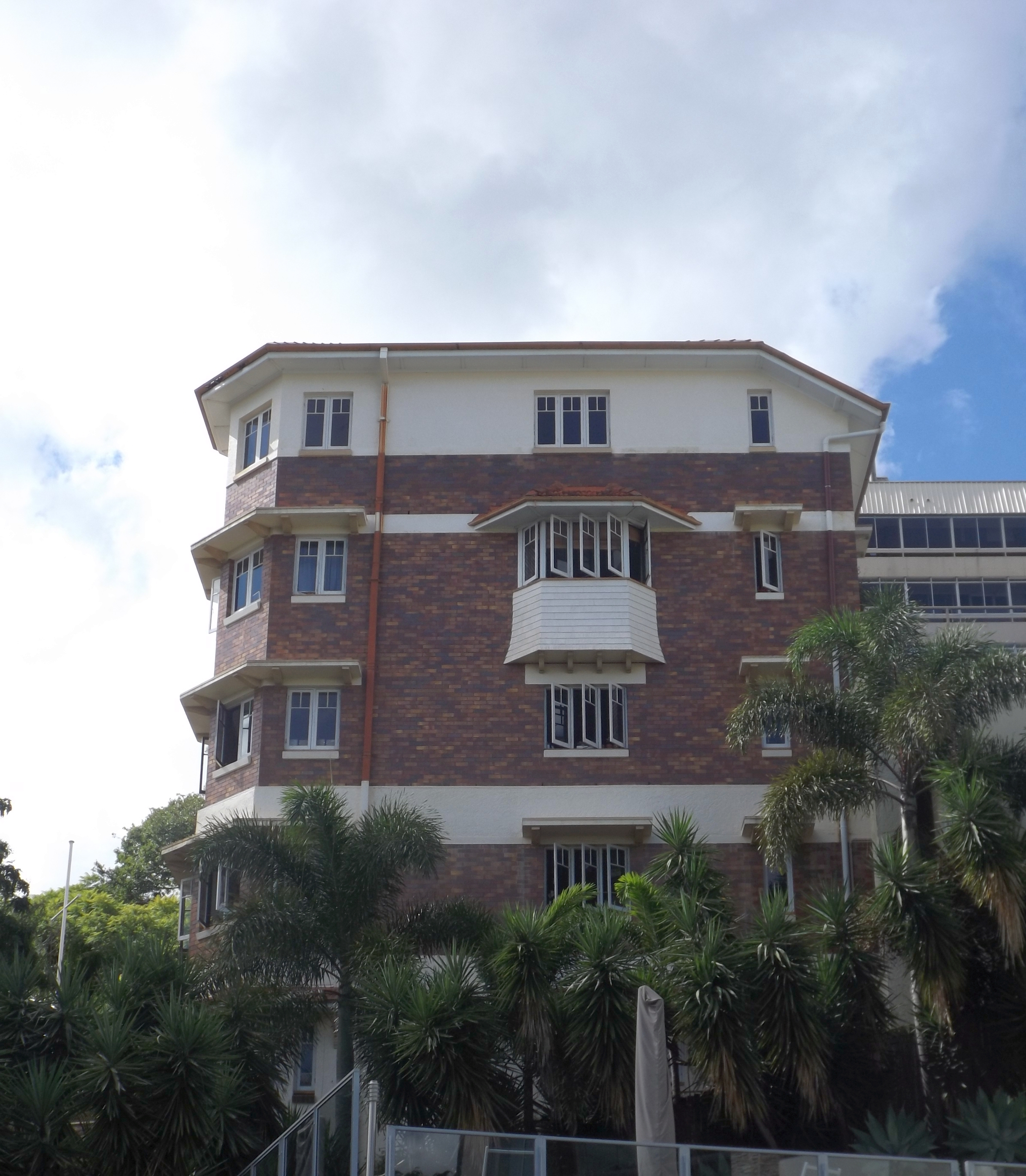
Cliffside Apartments, Kangaroo Point

Ronald Martin Wilson (1886–1967) was an architect and engineer in Brisbane, Queensland, Australia. A number of his works are heritage-listed.

== Early life ==
Ronald Martin Wilson was born 14 July 1886 in Yeronga in Brisbane, the son of architect Alexander Brown Wilson. He attended the Brisbane Normal School and the Brisbane Grammar School. He worked in his father's architecture firm as an assistant while completing a degree in engineering at the University of Queensland.

== Engineering ==
The first meeting of the Greater Brisbane Council in March 1925 established Cross River Commission to establish what bridges were needed for Brisbane. There were three members: chairman Roger Hawken, Professor of Engineering at the University of Queensland, William Muir Nelson and Wilson. Their report showed 11 proposed river crossings, and considered costs and savings made due to the reduction in haulage costs etc, and the need for a railway bridge was also discussed. Their report ultimately led to the construction of the William Jolly Bridge and the Story Bridge, but their proposal for a bridge at New Farm has yet to be realised.

== Architectural works ==
Notable works by Wilson include:

- Cliffside Apartments in Kangaroo Point, listed on the Queensland Heritage Register
- St Lucia Presbyterian Church listed on the Brisbane Heritage Register
- conversion of a private home in Chelmer into a World War II convalescent hospital, The Lady Wilson Red Cross Convalescent Home, later the Chelmer Police College, listed on the Queensland Heritage Register
- St George's Greek Orthodox Church, South Brisbane, circa 1958, listed on the Brisbane Heritage Register

== Later life ==
Wilson died on 19 July 1967 at St Lucia. He was cremated.

== Legacy ==
The Wilson family of architects have contributed to Brisbane architectural practice for over 130 years through four generations: Alexander Brown Wilson, Ronald Martin Wilson, Blair Wilson and Hamilton Wilson. Since 2014, the practice is known as Wilson Architects.
