= West Papua =

West Papua may refer to:

- Western New Guinea, the western half of the island of New Guinea administered by Indonesia
- West Papua (province), an Indonesian province comprising half of the Bird's Head Peninsula, the Bomberai Peninsula, and adjacent islands
- Republic of West Papua, a purported state seeking the independence of Western New Guinea from Indonesia

== See also ==
- West Papuan (disambiguation)
