= Papuan =

Papuan is an adjective referring to:

- anything related to New Guinea, a large island north of Australia
- anything related to one or another of the countries or territories on this island that are specifically known as Papua
- Indonesian Papuans, a classification of a group of people from Western New Guinea who are Indonesian citizens
- Papuan languages, a geographic group comprising a large number of the languages of New Guinea
- Papuans, the indigenous peoples of New Guinea

== See also ==
- Papua (disambiguation)
