= Chelmer Police College =

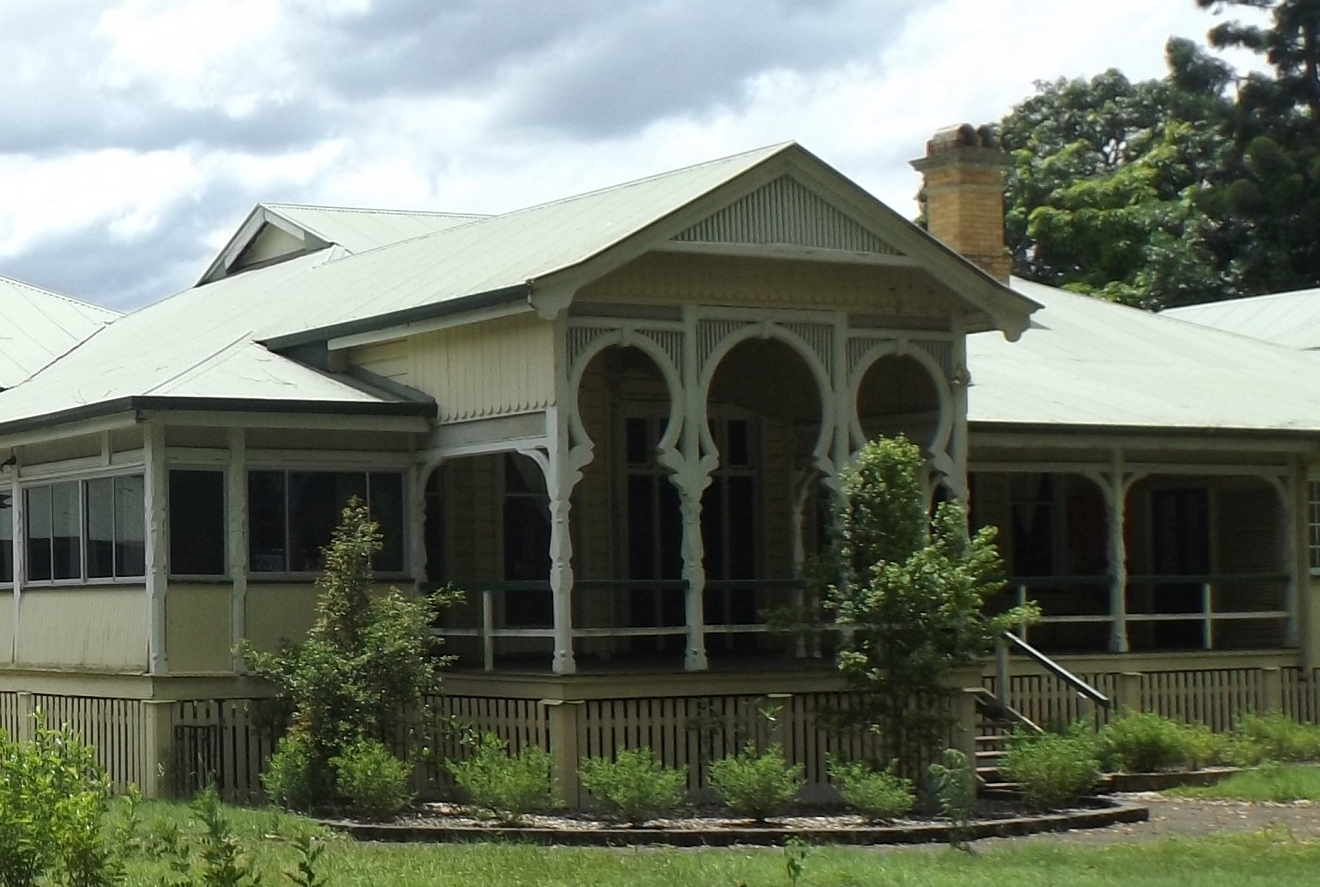
- Chelmer Police College, 2014

- Location within Queensland Location within Australia
- 27.5113°S 152.9697°E
- Location: 17 Laurel Avenue, Chelmer, City of Brisbane, Queensland, Australia

History
- Design period: 1900–1914 (early 20th century)
- Built: 1900–1970
- Built for: Thomas Beevor Steele

Queensland Heritage Register
- Official name: Chelmer Police College (former), 10 WRAAC Barracks, The Lady Wilson Red Cross Convalescent Home, Waterton
- Type: state heritage (landscape, built)
- Designated: 1 October 2003
- Reference no.: 602340
- Significant period: 1900s, 1940s (historical); 1900s, 1940s (fabric)
- Significant components: garden/grounds, trees/plantings, dining room, classroom/classroom block/teaching area, dormitory, kitchen/kitchen house

Chelmer Police College is a heritage-listed former police barracks at 17 Laurel Avenue, Chelmer, City of Brisbane, Queensland, Australia. It was built from 1900 to 1970. It is also known as 10 WRAAC Barracks, The Lady Wilson Red Cross Convalescent Home, and Waterton. It was added to the Queensland Heritage Register on 1 October 2003.

== History ==
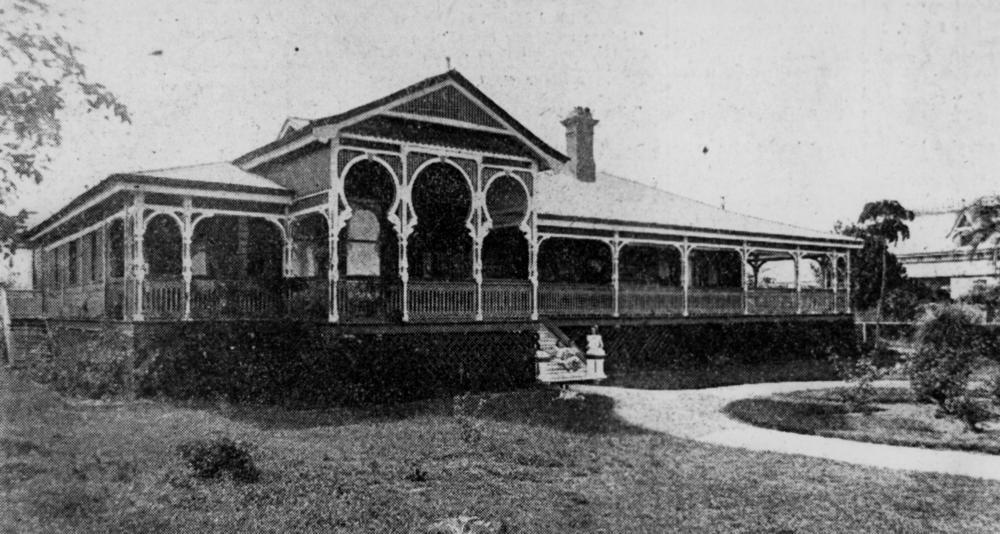
Waterton, 1906

The place which functioned as the Queensland Police College until 2012 at Chelmer, was established c. 1900 as a private residence, with additions in the form of staff quarters and a ward block constructed between 1941 and 1942 when the house was converted into a convalescent hospital for the Australian Red Cross Society.

The substantial, middle-class residence is thought to have been erected c. 1900 for Thomas Beevor Steele, a Brisbane insurance agent. Steele acquired title to the Laurel Avenue site in March 1900. At this time the property comprised two blocks totalling nearly one and a half acres, stretching from what is now Laurel Avenue to the Brisbane River. A £950 mortgage on the property taken out in September 1900 may have helped finance construction of the house, which was named Waterton. Steele, who previously resided at Indooroopilly, is first listed as resident at Chelmer in the 1901 Queensland Post Office Directory, suggesting that the house was constructed by this date. In February 1901, a Brisbane Courier newspaper article identified the Steele family as residing at "Waterton", Chelmer, a name that remained in use during its earliest years. In design and decorative elements, the house also suggests an early 20th century date of construction.

Title to the property passed in September 1913 to Alison Eavis Harding Frew (1883–1952), a prominent Queensland civil engineer, who resided there until c. 1940. A. E. Harding Frew specialized in bridge design, his work including approximately 80 bridges throughout Queensland during his career. He was a consulting engineer in Melbourne during the 1920s and on the Pyrmont Power Station at Sydney in the early 1940s. He was a consultant on the 1926 Brisbane Cross River Commission and was the designing engineer for the William Jolly Bridge in Brisbane, from 12 November 1926 to 1932. From 1932 to 1935 he was the Engineer for Bridge Construction on the Hornibrook Bridge project, the bridge linking Sandgate and Redcliffe. Much of this work was carried out during the period in which he and his family were based at 17 Laurel Avenue, Chelmer.

In 1938, Harding Frew acquired two blocks of land adjacent to the southern border of his Laurel Avenue property, creating an estate of approximately 3.75 acres (1.52 ha) with a long river frontage. However, he appears to have encountered financial difficulties about this time, taking out a number of mortgages on the property, and reputedly was bankrupted. In January 1939, Queensland Trustees Limited, as mortgagees in possession, offered 17 Laurel Avenue for sale at auction. At this time the dwelling comprised four bedrooms, a large dressing room, drawing and dining rooms, sitting rooms, lounge, spacious front and side verandahs and sleep-out, and a well-appointed kitchen and bathroom. There is a suggestion that Frew had made extensions to the c. 1900 house, but this has not been confirmed.

The property did not sell in January 1939. In July 1940, title to just over 1 rood (11,000 sq ft; 1,000 m^{2}) near the southeast corner of the site was transferred as a residential subdivision block, and in December 1940, the house and the remaining land, nearly 3.5 acres (1.4 ha), was transferred to the Australian Red Cross Society for use as a convalescent home for Australian servicemen returning from the battlefields of the Second World War. The purchase price was £2,000, which scarcely reflected the value of one of the oldest and largest family homes in the Chelmer district. Title was transferred to Red Cross trustees Edith Wassell and George Rees in 1941, and to the Australian Red Cross Society in 1947. The Society converted the house into the Lady Wilson Red Cross Convalescent Home, providing for the rehabilitation of convalescent Australian soldiers, sailors and airmen. The home was named in honour of Lady Wilson, President of the Queensland Division of the Australian Red Cross at this time, and wife of His Excellency Sir Leslie Orme Wilson, Governor of Queensland.

Conversion of the house into a convalescent home required additions to, and some alteration to internal partitions in, the main residence, and construction of a substantial dormitory block behind and parallel to the main house. In 1941, Brisbane architects Roderic Walter Voller, Ronald Martin Wilson, and Edward James Archibald Weller, as Honorary Architects to the Australian Red Cross Society, jointly called tenders for a new dormitory and officers' quarters for the Red Cross Society's Lady Wilson Convalescent Home at Chelmer. A contract for construction of the dormitory was let to contractor AS Taylor by June 1941, and tenders for "officers' quarters" (staff quarters) opened about August 1941. Minor works were still being carried out early in 1942. Photographs of the "Chelmer Convalescent Home", taken in August 1944, reveal that the northern addition to the house, which comprised the staff quarters, was constructed by this date. The place reputedly accommodated 73 patients. It is also likely that during the 1941–42 extensions including an institutional kitchen and dining room were verandahs, which has been replaced since with simple timber rails.

In the early 1950s the convalescent hospital was closed and the property was leased to the Australian Military Forces from 1 April 1953 for use as a Women's Royal Australian Army Corps Barracks, occupied by the 10 WRAAC. The WRAAC had been established in 1951 in response to a severe manpower shortage created by the demands of the Korean War and national service in a time of full employment. In the late 1970s female soldiers began to be integrated into the Army at large and in early 1984, the WRAAC was disbanded. In its 33 years of existence, the Corps played an important role in the evolution of Australia's armed forces and the acceptance of women into this field.

A valuation inspection of the Laurel Avenue property made in January 1953, prior to the military authorities taking up the lease, provided a thorough description (accompanied by plans) of the Red Cross structures on the property, and show how the buildings had functioned as a convalescent hospital. The core of the house contained recreational and office spaces, and a large dining room and kitchen extension at the rear. The northern addition to the main house served as staff quarters. To the rear of the main house and parallel to it, was a high-set, timber framed, fibrous-cement clad dormitory building.

The main building (the c. 1900 house) was described as approximately 50 years old, timber-framed, with 8 in (200 mm) chamferboard cladding to the exterior walls, and set on hardwood stumps which varied from 4 feet 6 inches (1.37 m) to 6 feet (1.8 m) in height. The roof retained its original corrugated galvanized iron. The house was surrounded by extensive verandahs, by that date mostly enclosed, and the verandah roofs were lined with 6 in (150 mm) vertically jointed pine boards. Flooring to the verandahs and much of the interior was 4 in × 1 in (102 mm × 25 mm) hardwood, with some 6 in × 1 in (152 mm × 25 mm) pine. The interior walls and ceilings were lined with 4 in (100 mm) vertically jointed pine. Most of the joinery, including early doors, fireplace surrounds and palm stands, were cedar. There was a front bay window with 6 feet (1.8 m) "colonial sashes", and French doors opening onto the verandahs. The main entrance door had leadlight surrounds. The dining room on the southwest corner of the main building had been extended as a dining hall, clad externally and lined internally with fibrous cement sheeting. Adjacent to this was an institutional-size kitchen. Bathrooms and toilets (which appear to have occupied an earlier kitchen wing) had vertically jointed timber ceilings, fibrous-cement sheeting on the walls, and terrazzo floors. There was a laundry under the main building.

At the northern end of the main building was the two-storeyed addition erected as staff quarters. This was timber-framed and clad externally with fibrous-cement sheeting. The ground floor contained an open lounge with a cement floor; an interior lounge with fibrous cement sheeting to ceiling and walls and hardwood floor; a dormitory, lined and ceiling in vertically jointed timber, with polished timber floor; and a bathroom/toilet. A covered stairway led to the upper level, which had a hardwood timber floor, and was lined with vertically jointed timber in the central room and fibrous-cement sheeting in two bedrooms and two dormitories.

At the rear of the main building was the dormitory or ward block, containing two wards separated by a central ablutions area, and a doctor's room, sister's room, and store room at the far northern end. Floors throughout were of hardwood and the ceilings of Caneite. The ablutions area had terrazzo flooring and contained toilets, showers and locker rooms arranged around a central passageway running north–south, servicing both wards. French doors opened from the wards onto verandahs along both sides, which were screened with Aerolax blinds. A sub-floor extended the entire length of the building. It had concrete flooring and had been used principally as workshops. It was also part-enclosed as library headquarters for the Red Cross in Queensland (a large room at the southern end); store rooms; ablution blocks; laundry; boiler room; and French polishing room. On the western side of the library was an extension which housed the handicraft section.

Beyond the dormitory building, to the west, was a detached, single-storey structure, timber framed, double-sheeted with fibrous-cement, and divided into two rooms, which were utilized as male staff quarters. This building had a "Super 6" roof of corrugated fibrous-cement sheeting.

Close to the northern boundary, midway along the depth of the property, was a single garage which appears to have been constructed during the period when the place functioned as a private residence. It was hardwood framed and floored, clad in 6 in (150 mm) timber chamferboards, and had a tiled roof. Beyond the garage the ground flattened out to a level floodplain, before dropping steeply to the Brisbane River.

Comparatively few changes were required for occupation by the 10 WRAAC from 1953 to 1969, and during this period the Red Cross continued to maintain its library headquarters in the sub-floor of the dormitory block. About 1964 or 1965, the Red Cross subdivided the land into smaller residential allotments around an extension of Sutton Street, leaving the buildings leased by the armed forces on a much smaller parcel of land. At this period the house lost its river access.

In the late 1960s a new facility for the WRAAC was constructed at Kelvin Grove. 10 WRAAC vacated 17 Laurel Avenue early in February 1969, although the Army's lease didn't expire until 31 October 1969. The Red Cross failed to sell the property at auction in May 1969, but toward the end of the year it was purchased by the Queensland Police Department for use as an in-service training centre. In January 1970, the Queensland Police College opened at 17 Laurel Avenue, offering a wide variety of specialist and qualifying courses. This function ceased in 2012. The main change to the grounds since 1970 has been the construction of a car park along the southern boundary of the property from Laurel Avenue to the former dormitory block.

== Description ==
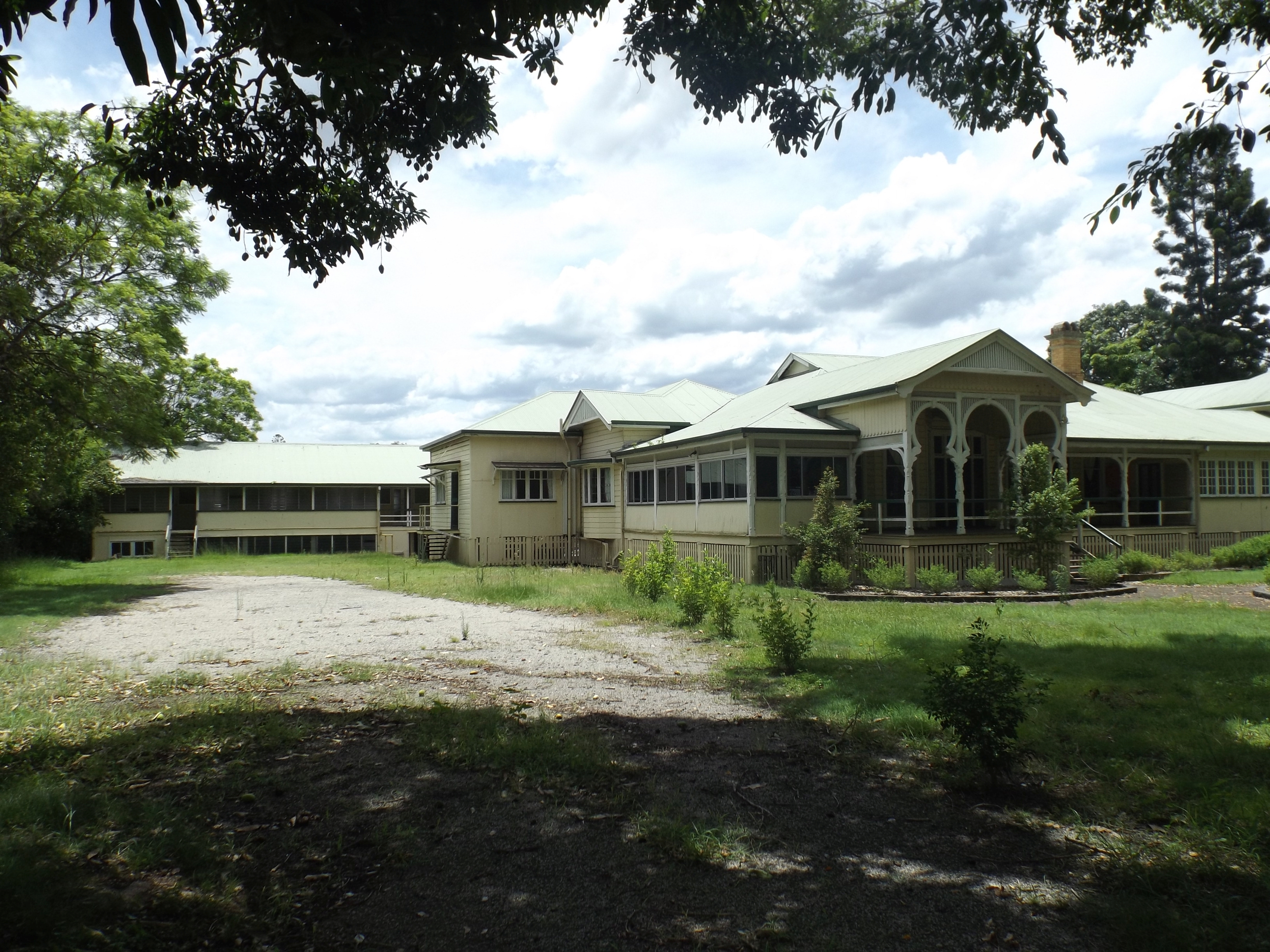
Abandoned building and grounds in 2014

This place is a memorable element of the Laurel Avenue streetscape, presenting as a large, Federation era house with prominent gable and sweeping verandahs, a big pitched metal roof and chimney, set well back behind an established garden and enhanced with mature fig trees in the street, flanking the entrance path.

The entrance path divides around a large circular garden bed before leading to the front stairs beside the prominent verandah gable. The front section of the house consists of formal rooms, along the lines of former drawing and dining rooms, a sitting room and lounge. A bay-fronted room is positioned behind the front gable and is of the same width, projecting a metre or so across the front verandah. The front verandah turns around this room forming the southern edge of the house. Immediately to the northern side of this front formal room is the entrance hall, and to the north of this again are two rooms back to back around a double-sided fireplace. The position of this fireplace is conveyed by the chimney in the views of the building from the front. The verandah turns around this pair of rooms, forming what was the northern side of the original house. The verandah edge details are still intact along this northern side verandah, indicating that c. 1941 northern addition to the original house was built immediately adjacent to the original house rather than cut into it.

The entrance hall leads to a north–south connecting hall with a formal room at its southern end. This formal room is identified by its own gable on the southern side of the house and a projecting bay window. The connecting hall runs past what is now a bar and leads to the stairs connecting the lower and upper floors of the c. 1941 northern addition to the original house.

The next layer of rooms consists of an institutional dining room and kitchen connected via an original rear verandah to a toilet and shower room wing. Three storerooms/offices in an enclosed verandah exist opposite the toilets/shower rooms. These rooms appear original. As this amenities wing has an external chimney on its rear wall it is likely that this was the original kitchen/servants' wing. The main building is connected via an elevated covered walkway to the dormitory building running along what is now the rear boundary of the property.

The dormitory building consists of front and rear verandahs, in various degrees of enclosure, and internally is planned around a central corridor accessing small, simple bedrooms and shared amenities rooms. It is highset with a largely open undercroft, and some simply enclosed rooms which could serve as store rooms or workshops.

The c. 1941 addition to the north of the old house is of two storeys. The upper floor consists of a lecture room to the front, a covered verandah space in the middle and two office rooms to the rear. The lower floor has two rooms to either side of the central covered space. A staircase connects both central verandahs and another stair connects the addition to the original building.

Internally, the joinery and fittings in the c. 1900 house are of good quality, consistent with the Federation era styling of the exterior, without being excessively lavish. Skirtings and architraves in particular are simple but generously proportioned. It is possible that some of the joinery and moldings currently painted were originally clear finished red cedar, or similar, which if re-instated would increase the visual richness of the interiors considerably. The walls and ceilings generally are lined with painted, tongue-and-groove, vertically jointed timber, with either elaborate ceiling roses or coffers, bay windows, or decorative fireplaces used to elevate the character of the formal rooms. More simply treated rooms such as bedrooms and service rooms have been largely removed or remodelled. The later additions are altogether more pragmatic and possibly more altered to suit changing needs than the original sections of the building. The internal linings in the two storeyed c. 1941 addition and the c. 1941 dormitory building are generally a combination of tongue-and-groove walling and battened, smooth sheeted ceilings with simple, largely traditional joinery and detailing.

The lowest, former house with its generous, pitched roof relates well to its front yard and the Laurel Avenue street trees. It is set well back behind an established garden and enhanced by mature fig trees (Ficus benjamina) in the street, flanking the entrance path. The entrance path divides around a circular garden bed which may be an original garden design feature. Mature trees such as a Jacaranda mimosifolia, palms and mango (Mangifera indica) in the front yard, and the camphor laurel (Cinnamomum camphora) in the street to the south of the figs, contribute significantly to the aesthetics of the setting. The Federation era detailing and decoration of the old house, as seen from the front yard, is strong, well balanced and effective. The battened front gable and heavily shaped verandah posts with decorative sweeps and frieze in particular provide a strong visual appeal. The c. 1941 addition to the north of the original building is discernibly different from the earlier building but arguably sympathetic in roof line and joinery. The c. 1941 dormitory building to the rear of the property and the other substantial changes to the house are contained at the rear of the original building, without detracting from the presentation to the street.

Despite many years of pragmatic institutional maintenance and incremental change to suit changing functions, each historical layer of building work is clearly articulated, with limited impact on earlier fabric. The buildings in their front garden setting present a cohesive, substantially intact group demonstrating the principal characteristics of both a substantial, c. 1900 middle-class residence and a c. 1941 convalescent home.

== Heritage listing ==
Chelmer Police College (former) was listed on the Queensland Heritage Register on 1 October 2003 having satisfied the following criteria.

The place is important in demonstrating the evolution or pattern of Queensland's history.

The Queensland Police College (former) at 17 Laurel Avenue, Chelmer, was constructed c. 1900 as a private residence, Waterton, for Brisbane insurance agent Thomas Beevor Steele. From c. 1913 to c. 1940 it was occupied by AE Harding Frew, a prominent Queensland civil engineer. The place demonstrates the pattern of Queensland's history, being evidence of the early 20th century suburban occupation of the Chelmer district by upper middle class residents, who constructed large family homes in spacious grounds, many of which had river frontages. As the Lady Wilson Red Cross Convalescent Home for returned members of the Australian armed services from c. 1941 to c. 1953, the place provides evidence in the fabric of the building of a Queensland response to the impact of the Second World War. Changes made to the building and grounds to accommodate the hospital have not obliterated evidence of the earlier function as a private residence. Following the close of the convalescent home, the place served as a Women's Royal Australian Army Barracks from 1953 to 1969, and as a Queensland Police College from 1970 to 2012, maintaining an institutional use which had little impact on the predominantly residential character of Laurel Avenue. Evidence of these uses is readily apparent in the fabric of the building.

The place is important in demonstrating the principal characteristics of a particular class of cultural places.

The former residence in its garden setting is of strong architectural merit, exhibiting particular aesthetic characteristics valued by the community and demonstrates the principal characteristics of a particular class of cultural place. This building is a memorable element of the Laurel Avenue streetscape, presenting as a large Federation-era house with prominent gable and sweeping verandahs, a big pitched metal roof and chimney, set well back behind an established garden and enhanced with mature fig trees (Ficus benjamina) in the street, flanking the entrance path. The c. 1941 northern addition to the house to accommodate the convalescent hospital staff is of interest in the sensitive placement beside or behind the original building, indicating that the appearance of the buildings from the street was of importance at the time. The c. 1941 addition to the north of the original house has a similarity of form with the original, and has been distinguished from the original in its use of fibrous-cement cladding consistent with architectural thinking at the time regarding its construction and the character of its use. The c. 1941 dormitory building is also fibrous-cement clad and this is consistent with its institutional use and pragmatic character.

As a formerly residential building converted to an institutional use the place provides evidence of the impact of the Second World War on Queensland and is important in illustrating the principal characteristics of its type, namely a c. 1941 convalescent hospital. The c. 1941 dormitory to the rear of the site has been carefully sited to minimise impacts on the appearance of the original building from the street, while achieving a close link with the necessary service spaces such as kitchen and dining room inserted in the original building. The form of the dormitory building is of note - the central enclosed space functioning as either a single space or (as currently) a series of rooms off a central corridor, flanked by verandahs which can be either open or enclosed, is a generic form similar to other Second World War hospital buildings, such as formerly at Rhyndarra in Yeronga (now demolished), but is not a standard public works design. Again, the c. 1941 addition to the north of the house was custom-designed for this site and its particular use.

The place is important because of its aesthetic significance.

The former residence in its garden setting is of strong architectural merit, exhibiting particular aesthetic characteristics valued by the community and demonstrates the principal characteristics of a particular class of cultural place. This building is a memorable element of the Laurel Avenue streetscape, presenting as a large Federation-era house with prominent gable and sweeping verandahs, a big pitched metal roof and chimney, set well back behind an established garden and enhanced with mature fig trees (Ficus benjamina) in the street, flanking the entrance path. The c. 1941 northern addition to the house to accommodate the convalescent hospital staff is of interest in the sensitive placement beside or behind the original building, indicating that the appearance of the buildings from the street was of importance at the time. The c. 1941 addition to the north of the original house has a similarity of form with the original, and has been distinguished from the original in its use of fibrous-cement cladding consistent with architectural thinking at the time regarding its construction and the character of its use. The c. 1941 dormitory building is also fibrous-cement clad and this is consistent with its institutional use and pragmatic character.

The place has a special association with the life or work of a particular person, group or organisation of importance in Queensland's history.

The place has had a special association with the work of the Australian Red Cross as a Convalescent Home, with the Australian Army as a Women's Royal Australian Army Corps (WRAAC) barracks, and with the Queensland Police Service as a training college. The combination of these associations, demonstrated in this one building, gives the place significance in Queensland's history.
