= List of law enforcement agencies in Australia =

Law enforcement in Australia is carried out on federal, state, and local levels. This is facilitated by various different uniformed 'sworn' law enforcement agencies and 'regulatory' agencies. Sworn law enforcement agencies generally consist of law enforcement officers that have powers of arrest, whereas regulatory agencies normally set out and enforce compliance of specific laws and regulations and are normally composed of non-police investigators. For more on law enforcement in Australia see Law enforcement in Australia.

== Federal ==
=== Sworn Agencies ===
- Australian Border Force
- Australian Federal Police
- Joint Military Police Unit
  - Australian Defence Force Investigative Service
    - Royal Australian Air Force Security Police
    - Royal Australian Corps of Military Police
    - Royal Australian Naval Police

=== Regulatory Agencies ===
- Australian Communications and Media Authority
- Australian Competition & Consumer Commission
- Australian Criminal Intelligence Commission
- Australian Energy Market Commission
- Australian Fisheries Management Authority
- Australian Maritime Safety Authority
- Australian National Audit Office
- Australian Prudential Regulation Authority
- Australian Radiation Protection and Nuclear Safety Agency
- Australian Securities & Investments Commission
- Australian Taxation Office
- Civil Aviation Safety Authority
- Defence Security and Vetting Service
- Department of Home Affairs (Australia)
  - Australian Security Intelligence Organisation
- National Anti-Corruption Commission (Australia)

== State ==
=== Australian Capital Territory ===
- ACT Corrective Services
- ACT Policing

=== New South Wales ===
- New South Wales Police Force
- Corrective Services NSW
- New South Wales Department of Primary Industries
- Office of the Sheriff of New South Wales

=== Norfolk Island ===
- Norfolk Island Police Force

=== Northern Territory ===
- Northern Territory Correctional Services
- Northern Territory Police

=== Queensland ===
- Queensland Boating and Fisheries Patrol
- Queensland Corrective Services
- Queensland Police Service
- Queensland Parks and Wildlife Service

=== South Australia ===
- Department for Correctional Services
- South Australia Police

=== Tasmania ===
- Tasmania Police
- Tasmania Prison Service

=== Victoria ===
- Victorian Fisheries Authority
- RSPCA
- Corrections Victoria
- Victoria Police

=== Western Australia ===
- Department of Corrective Services
- Western Australia Police Force
- Department of Fisheries
