= RACMP =

RACMP may refer to:

- Real Academia de Ciencias Morales y Políticas (English: Royal Academy of Moral and Political Sciences), national academy, Spain
- Royal Australian Corps of Military Police, military unit, Australia
