= Law enforcement in Australia =

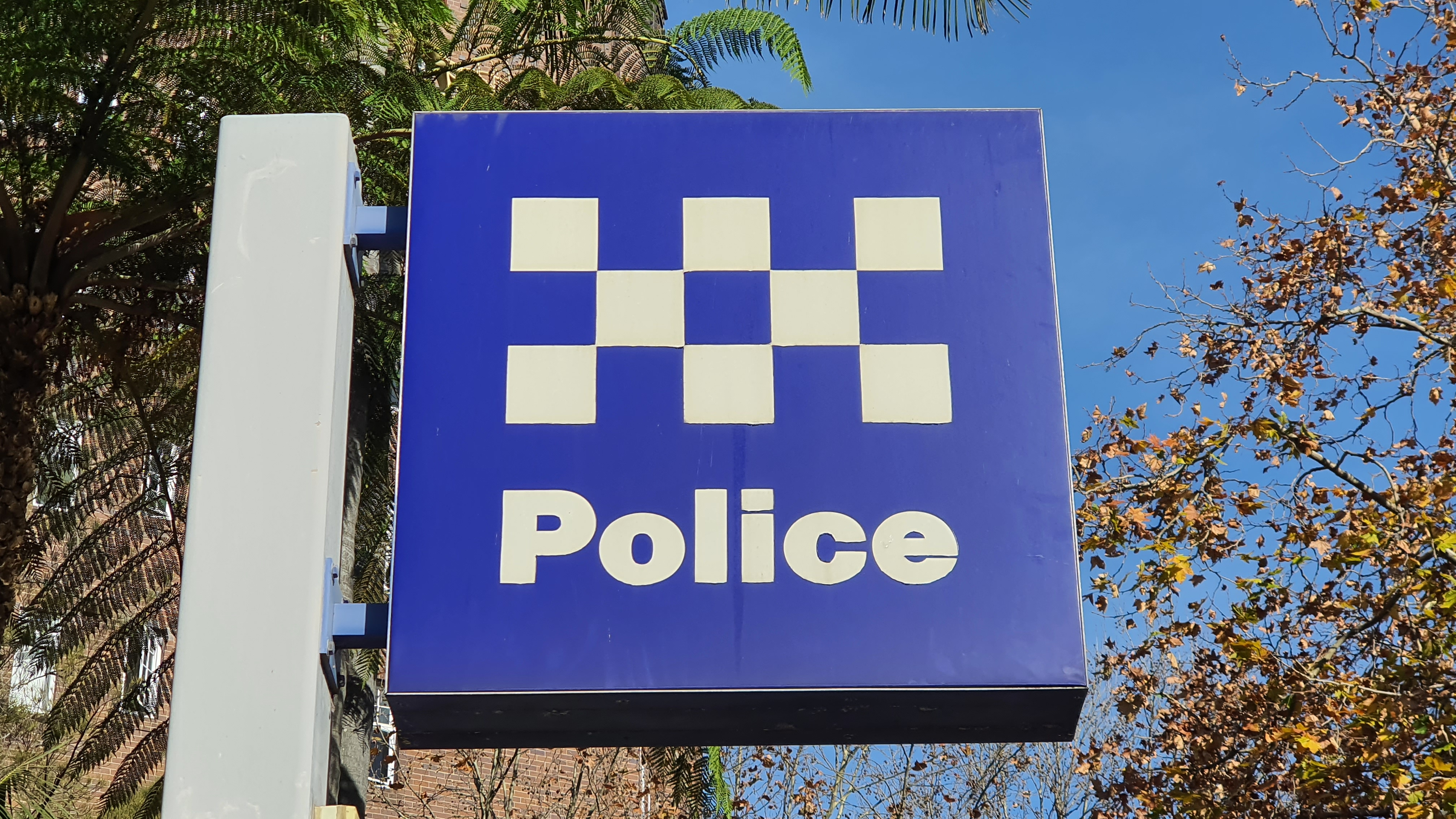
Australian police station sign

Law enforcement in Australia is one of the three major components of the country's justice system, along with courts and corrections. Law enforcement officers are employed by all three levels of government – federal, state/territory, and local.

Federally, the primary law enforcement agency is the Australian Federal Police (AFP), which has a wide mandate to enforce Australian criminal law and protect its national interests. There is also a number of other agencies that have powers confined to specific areas, such as customs and immigration (Australian Border Force), and white-collar crime (Australian Taxation Office, Australian Competition & Consumer Commission, Australian Securities & Investments Commission). Each branch of the Australian Defence Force (ADF) has its own military police which operates under the Joint Military Police Unit (JMPU). The ADF Investigative Service also forms part of the JMPU and is the primary agency for complex investigations that fall under the Defence Force Discipline Act.

General law enforcement duties are generally the responsibility of state police forces, who are in turn responsible to a state government minister (usually a Minister for Police). These forces carry out uniformed policing throughout the entire state in which they operate. Other state government agencies may also have investigative or enforcement powers for specific offences within their purview, such as fisheries. The Northern Territory is the only Australian territory with its own police force, but in Australia's other territories (including the Australian Capital Territory) law enforcement is handled by the Federal Government, specifically ACT Policing under the Australian Federal Police. Local governments may also employ their authorised officers, commonly known as council rangers, to enforce local government by-laws or certain state laws pertaining solely to the local government jurisdiction in which they're employed. Council rangers do not have full police powers unless they are sworn as special constables.

State police officers and Australian Federal Police officers routinely carry firearms, other state and federal law enforcement officers may carry firearms or other items for personal defence depending on their agency or the condition in which they're deployed. While on duty, an armed law enforcement officer's duty belt generally consists of a handgun, Taser, expandable baton, pepper spray, a set of handcuffs, ammunition magazines, gloves, torch, and a two-way radio.

== Federal ==
=== Australian Federal Police ===
The primary federal law enforcement agency in Australia is the Australian Federal Police. The AFP was created in 1979, having been the result of an amalgamation of the now-defunct Commonwealth Police and Australian Capital Territory Police Force. It is responsible for the investigation of federal offences (crimes against the Commonwealth), and has federal jurisdiction throughout Australia. It provides protective services to federal government properties, government personnel, dignitaries and foreign diplomatic officials, and major airports. It also provides regular law enforcement within external Australian territories, the Australian Capital Territory and the Jervis Bay Territory. The boundaries between the two levels of law enforcement are somewhat flexible, and both state and federal police cooperate on or transfer cases between each other depending on the specific circumstances.

The AFP also conducts operations overseas. These include providing liaison officers to various overseas posts to assist in relations with various police forces overseas, providing community policing to assist in the development of foreign law enforcement agencies, and contributing to peacekeeping operations such as the RAMSI Mission in the Solomon Islands and the UN Peacekeeping Force in Cyprus.

The AFP forms part of Australia's National Intelligence Community.

=== Australian Border Force ===
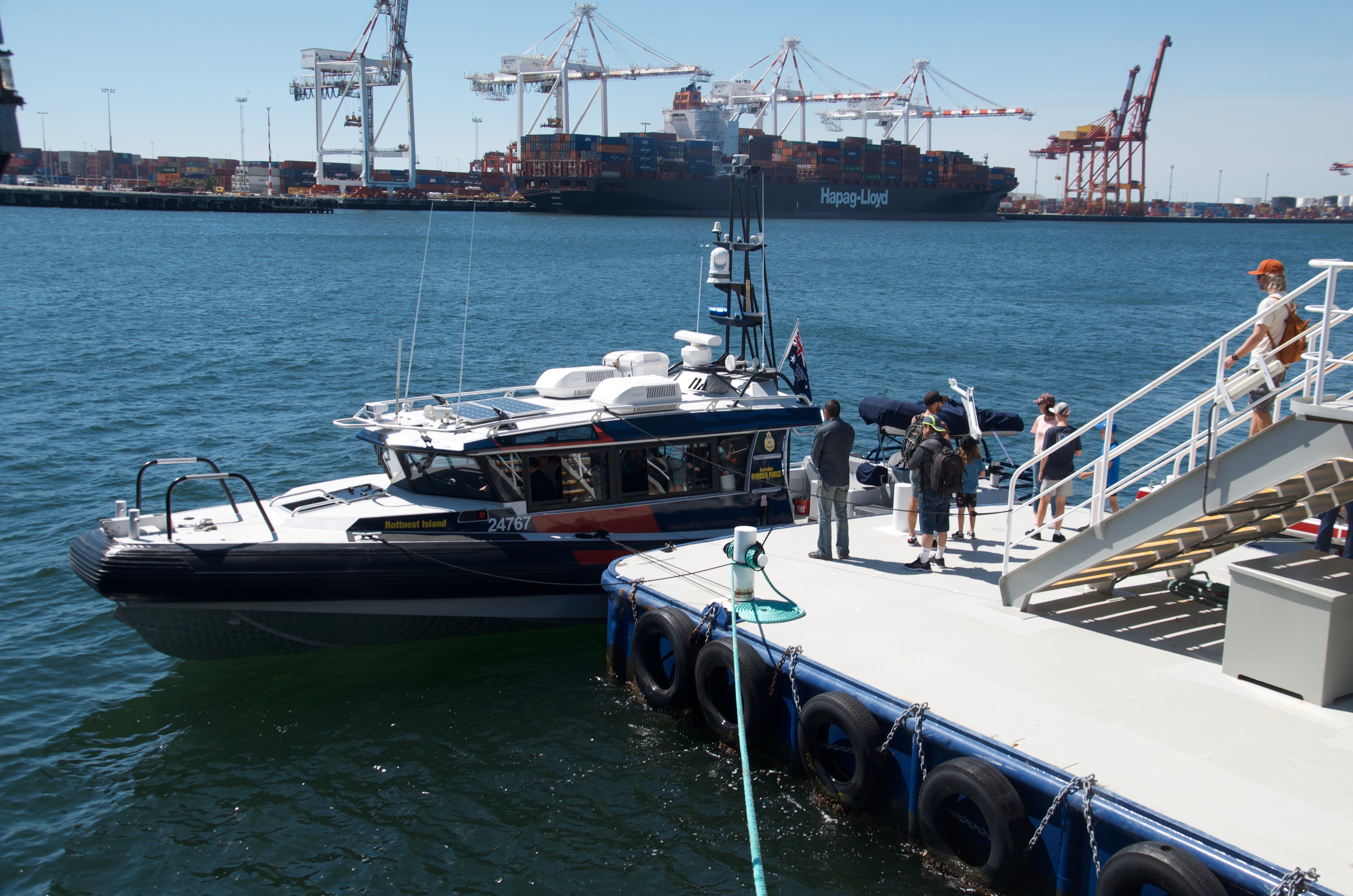
Border Force in Fremantle

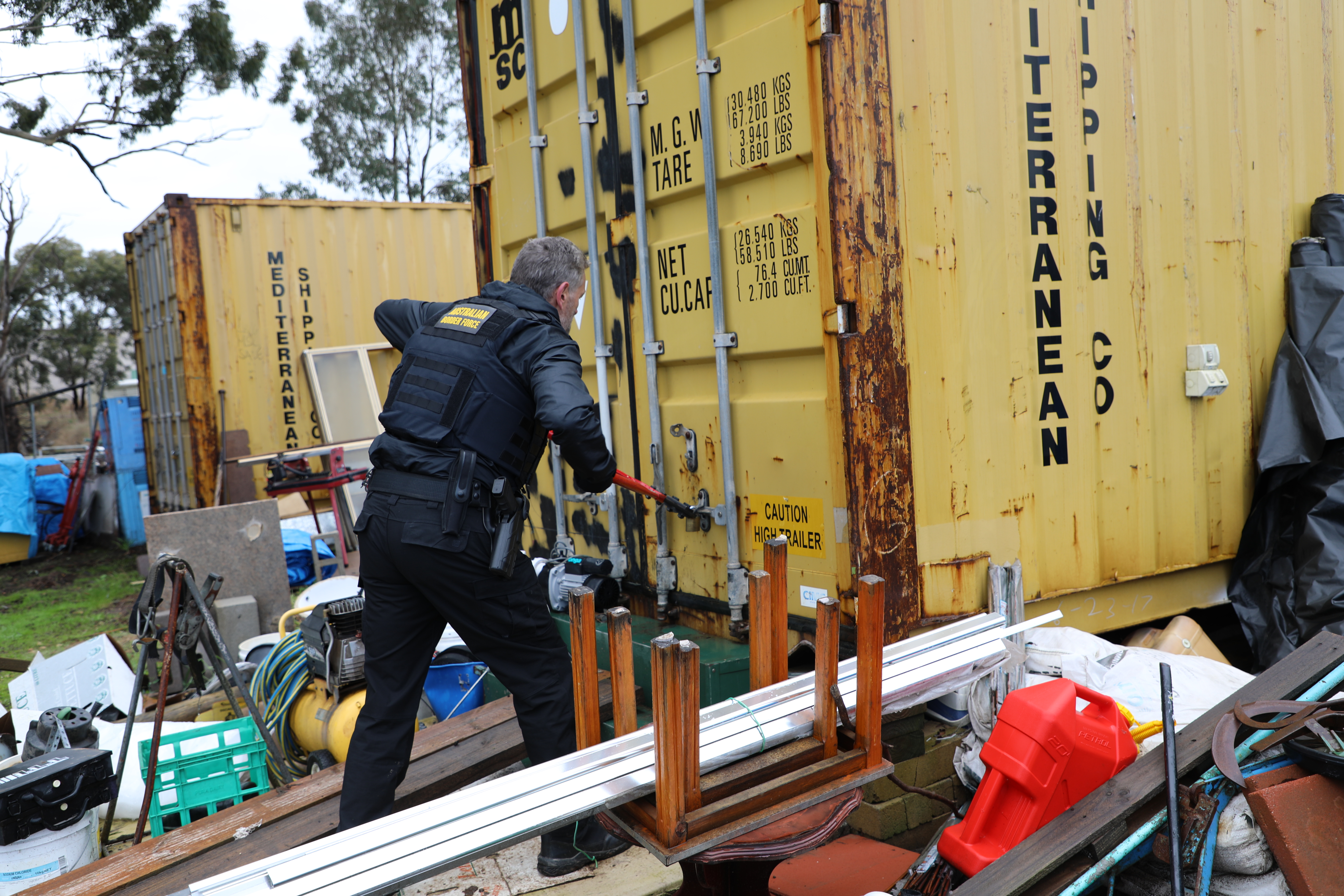
Australian Border Force Investigator forces entry into a container

The Australian Border Force is responsible for customs and immigration enforcement and border protection at Australia's ports as well as in Australian waters, and conducts investigations where the AFP does not have primary jurisdiction. Unlike AFP Officers, Border Force Officers do not have fully vested federal police powers, and can only exercise arrest and detain powers at airport and seaport jurisdictions. They may, however, detain persons for state or federal crimes or warrants until that person can be presented to a federal or state law enforcement officer with the appropriate powers. Australian Border Force officers have the authority to carry firearms when trained. In practice, only maritime, counter-terrorism, and investigation officers carry firearms.

=== Australian Fisheries Management Authority ===
The Australian Fisheries Management Authority (AFMA) provides fisheries enforcement in Australia's Exclusive Economic Zone, officers are authorised under the Fisheries Management Act 1991 to board and search vessels, and search vehicles and persons suspected of committing fisheries offences and may also search shore-based installation under a search warrant or in other specific circumstances. AFMA officers may with or without a warrant, arrest a person suspected of committing a fisheries offence or an offence against environmental law, and authorised to carry personal defense equipment. Like the Australian Federal Police and Australian Border Force, AFMA is overseen by the National Anti-Corruption Commission.

=== Australian Taxation Office ===
The Australian Taxation Office is a revenue service responsible for tax collection throughout Australia. The ATO is overseen by the National Anti-Corruption Commission. ATO officers are provided limited law enforcement powers under the Excise Act 1901 and the Tax Administration Act 1953. AFP and ABF officers are also provided powers under these Acts.

=== Australian Criminal Intelligence Commission ===
The Australian Criminal Intelligence Commission (ACIC) is a standing commission to provide criminal intelligence to Federal and State law enforcement agencies and assists in criminal investigations. ACIC is formed under the Australian Crime Commission Act, and while the Commission itself does not have full law enforcement powers, law enforcement officers from state and federal agencies are routinely seconded to the ACIC to assist in its functions. Under the Australian Crime Commission Act ACIC members have a number of coercive powers to gather criminal intelligence. The Australian Institute of Criminology (AIC), is an independent criminology research institute formed under the ACIC, with the CEO of the ACIC also serving as the director of the ACI. Like the AFP, ACIC is also part of the Australian Intelligence Community.

=== National Anti-Corruption Commission ===
The National Anti-Corruption Commission (NACC) is a statutory anti-corruption commission responsible for investigating allegations of corrupt conduct by Commonwealth officials. The commission has the power to investigate Commonwealth ministers, public servants, statutory office holders, government agencies, parliamentarians, and personal staff of politicians and replaced the Australian Commission for Law Enforcement Integrity. The commission's powers are equivalent to that of a Royal Commission with the ability to compel witnesses and compel documents to be produced to the commission.

== Military ==
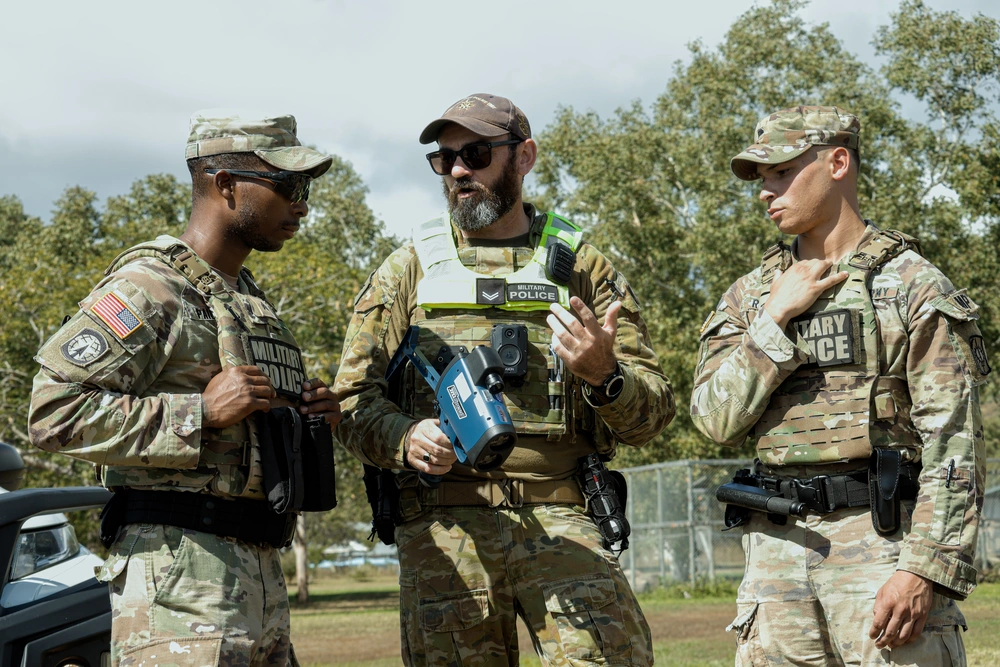
ADF Military Police (center) during Talisman Sabre alongside U.S. Army Military Police.

Military Police, also known as Service Police, are the law enforcement branches of the services of a military tasked with enforcing and investigating offences violating military law.

In Australia, each branch of the Australian Defence Force maintains its independent police force made up of military personnel from that service. In the Australian Army, the Royal Australian Corps of Military Police conducts general law enforcement duties including security on military installations, investigations and close personal protection. In the Royal Australian Navy, policing functions are undertaken by Coxswains. In the Royal Australian Air Force, security and law enforcement duties are undertaken by Security Forces and Airfield Defence personnel.

Along with the independent service police forces is the Australian Defence Force Investigative Service (ADFIS), a special ADF unit made up of Investigators from each service's police and tasked with investigating more serious military offences. All ADF policing agencies come under the umbrella of the Joint Military Police Unit (JMPU), an agency of the Australian Department of Defence led by the Provost Marshal and tasked with providing specialised military policing services and supporting civilian police in defence matters.

== State/territory ==
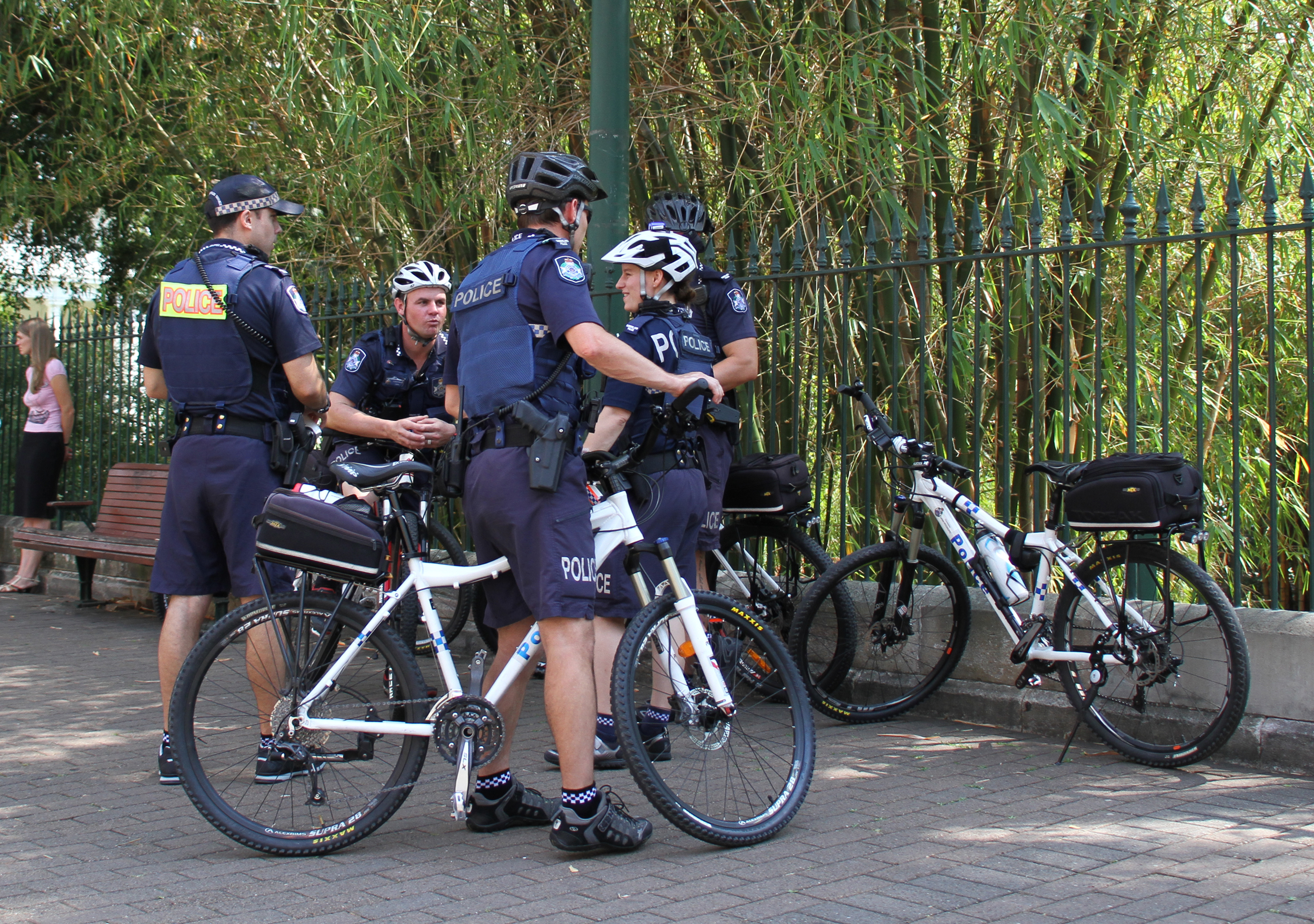
Queensland Police Service officers patrolling on bicycles.

Each state, as well as the Northern Territory, is responsible for maintaining its police force which is responsible for policing at the state and local levels. This involves general law and order, forensics, traffic policing, major crime, anti-terrorism branches, water police, search and rescue and in some states transit police. Local policing in the Australian Capital Territory, Jervis Bay Territory and Australian external territories is contracted to the Australian Federal Police (AFP). Each state has a Department of Corrections which looks after the jails and prisoners.

In some states, local governments employ by-laws officers or rangers to enforce local by-laws or ordinances relating to such matters as parking, dog ownership, retailing, littering, or water usage. These local government officers are not considered to be police forces as they generally only have the power to issue fines and do not have the same powers as state police. They may rely upon appointment as a special constable or legislated powers for their authority.

=== Police ===
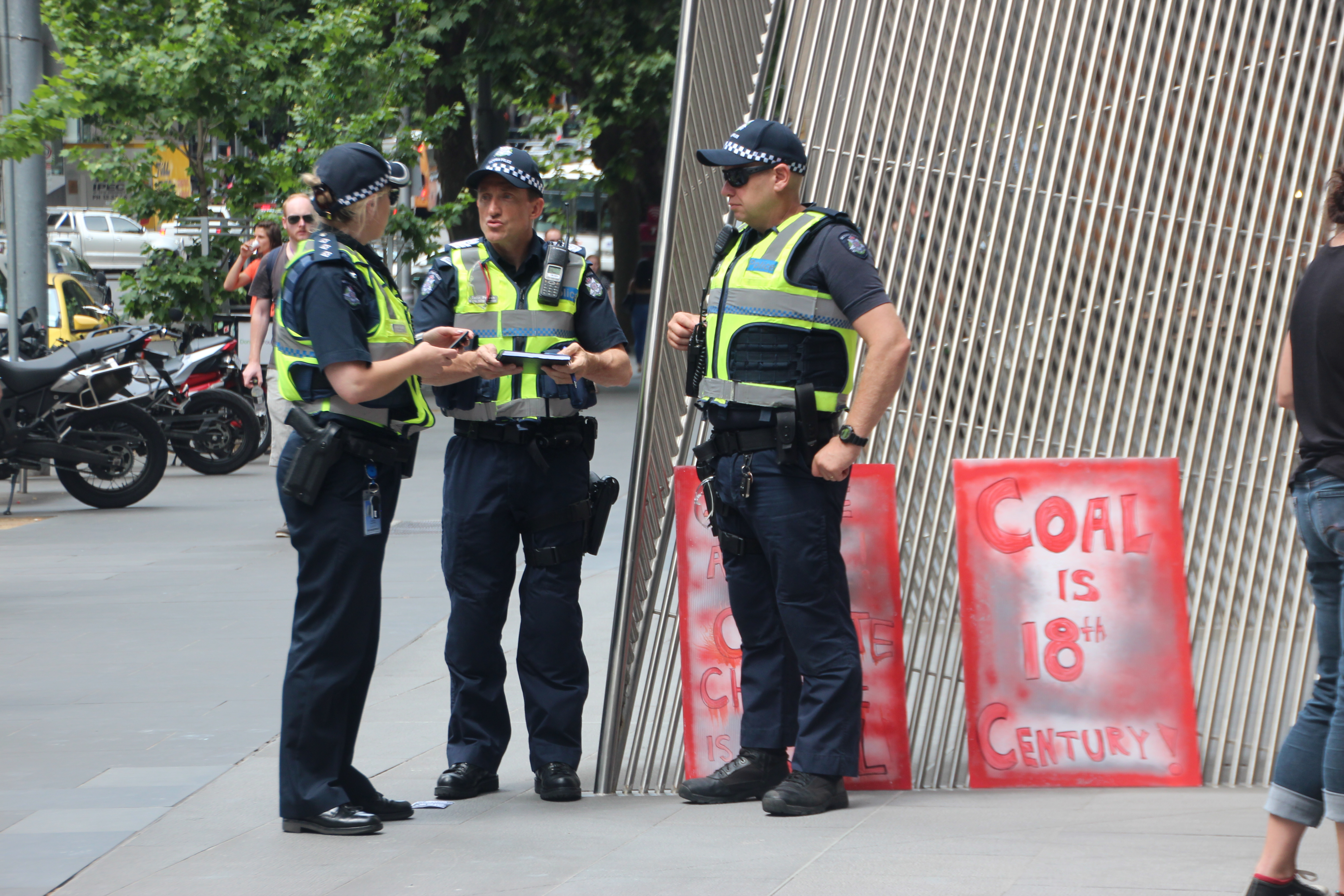
Victoria Police officers on duty at a protest

State police also perform certain functions on behalf of the Australian government such as the enforcement of various Commonwealth Acts and regulations in conjunction with the Australian Federal Police and other Commonwealth officers.

The Australian Capital Territory (ACT) and Jervis Bay Territory are serviced by the Australian Federal Police (AFP) ACT Policing. The AFP also provide local policing the Australian external territories.

While ACT Policing is under the jurisdiction of the Australian Federal Police, the following policing agencies are regulated by their respective state or territory government and are highly visible:

| Coat of Arms | Agency | State / Territory | Headquarters | Officers | Commissioner |
|---|---|---|---|---|---|
| | New South Wales Police Force | New South Wales | 1 Charles Street, Parramatta, Sydney | 17,348 | Mal Lanyon |
| | Northern Territory Police Force | Northern Territory | 914 McMillans Road, Knuckey Lagoon, Darwin | 1,700 | Martin Dole |
| | Queensland Police Service | Queensland | 200 Roma Street, Brisbane | 11,880 | Brett Pointing |
| | South Australia Police | South Australia | 100 Angas Street, Adelaide | c. 5,000 | Grant Stevens |
| | Tasmania Police | Tasmania | 37 Liverpool Street, Hobart | 1,376 | Donna Adams |
| | Victoria Police | Victoria | 313 Spencer Street, Docklands, Melbourne | 15,651 | Mike Bush |
| | Western Australia Police Force | Western Australia | 2 Adelaide Terrace, East Perth | c. 7,000 | Col Blanch |

=== Sheriffs ===
In recent years, the states and territories have returned the responsibility of recovering court-ordered fines to their sheriffs. In practice, the police often carry out the functions of sheriffs and bailiffs in rural and more sparsely populated areas of Australia.

The office of sheriff was first established in Australia in 1824. This was simultaneous with the appointment of the first Chief Justice of New South Wales. The role of the sheriff has not been static, nor is it identical in each Australian state. In the past, a sheriff's duties included: executing court judgments, acting as a coroner, transporting prisoners, managing the jails, and carrying out executions (through the employment of an anonymous hangman).

Currently, no Australian state provides for capital punishment. A government department (usually called the Department of Corrections or similar) now runs the prison system and the coroner's office handles coronal matters. In most states, the sheriff is now largely responsible for enforcing the civil orders and fines of the court by seizing and selling the property of judgment debtors who do not satisfy the debt, providing court security, enforcing arrest warrants, evictions, taking juveniles into custody, and running the jury system. In some states the duties of the Sheriff also extends to courtroom security. Some state sheriffs can also apply a wide range of sanctions ranging from suspending driver's licenses and car registration through to wheel clamping and arranging community service orders, and as a last resort can make arrests.

=== Fisheries ===
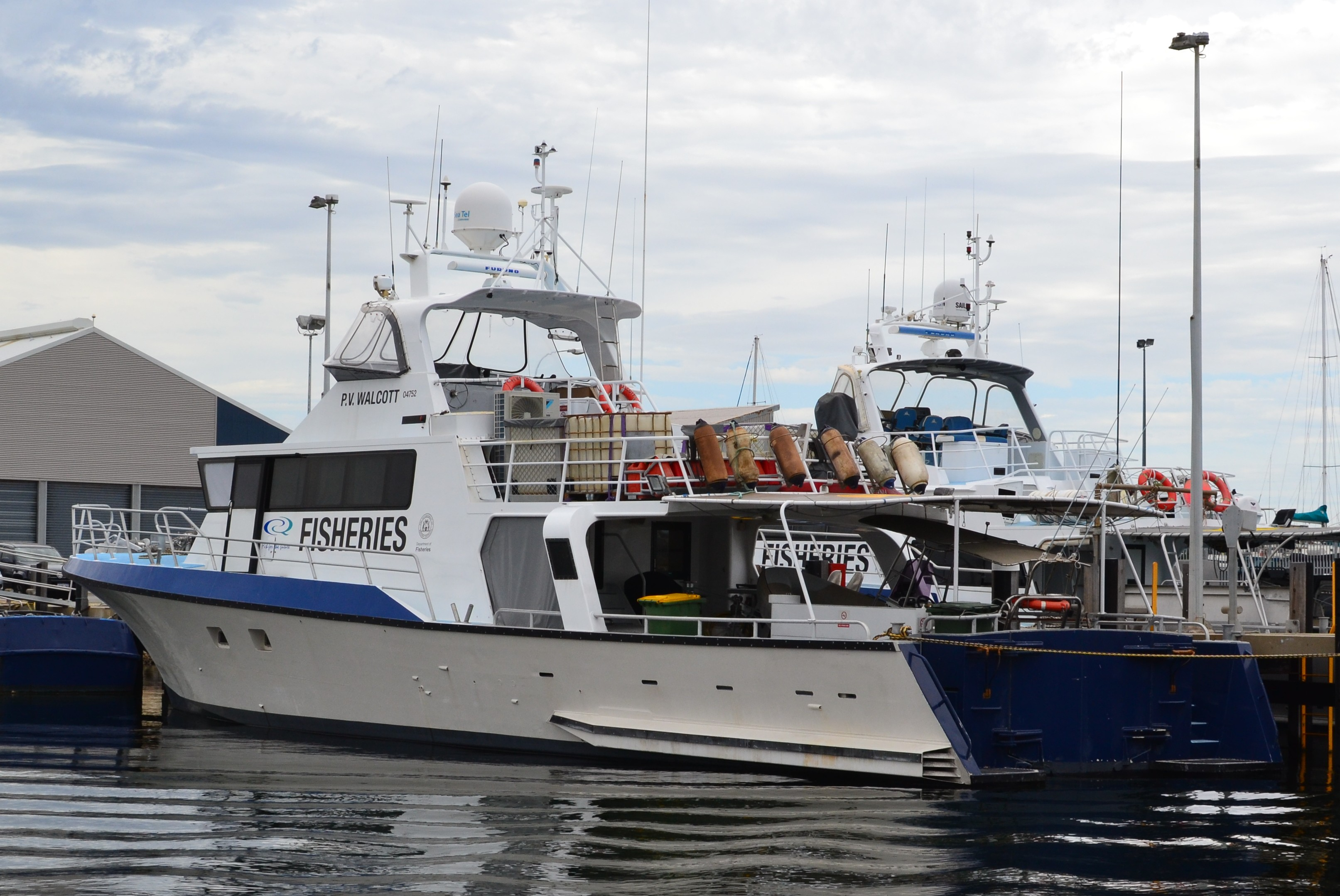
Western Australian Fisheries vessel Walcott.

In addition to the Australian Fisheries Management Authority, each state and the Northern Territory have Fisheries officers authorised to enforce State and Federal fisheries laws within their state's jurisdiction. The powers of these fisheries officers vary from State to State but generally, these officers have the power to board vessels, search vehicles, vessels, and persons and conduct arrests all in relation to fisheries laws. In some States, such as New South Wales, fisheries officers are authorised to carry personal defense equipment like their Federal counterparts.

=== Local ===
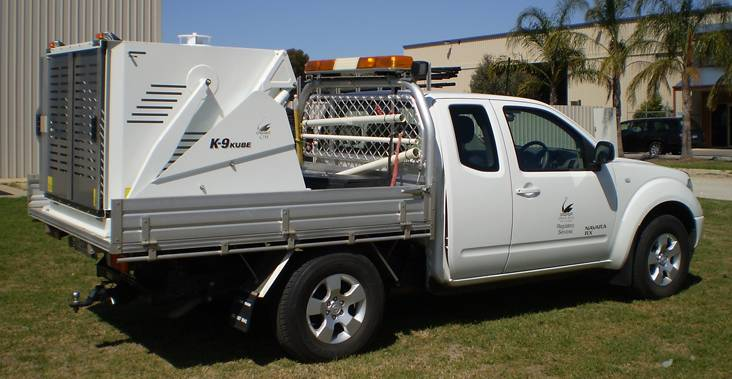
Typical Council Ranger vehicle fitted with orange lights and a K9 Kube for dog collection

Council rangers are officers employed by local government areas in Australia to enforce the by-laws (local laws in Western Australia); of those local governments and a limited range of state laws relating to such matters as litter control, animal control, dog and cat laws, fire control, off-road vehicles, emergency management, and parking. Unless they are also sworn in as special constables rangers do not have full police powers. Council rangers are also referred to as local laws officers in some of Australia's eastern states. Most Council rangers have the power to issue fines that do not exceed a certain amount.

== Advisory bodies and community groups ==
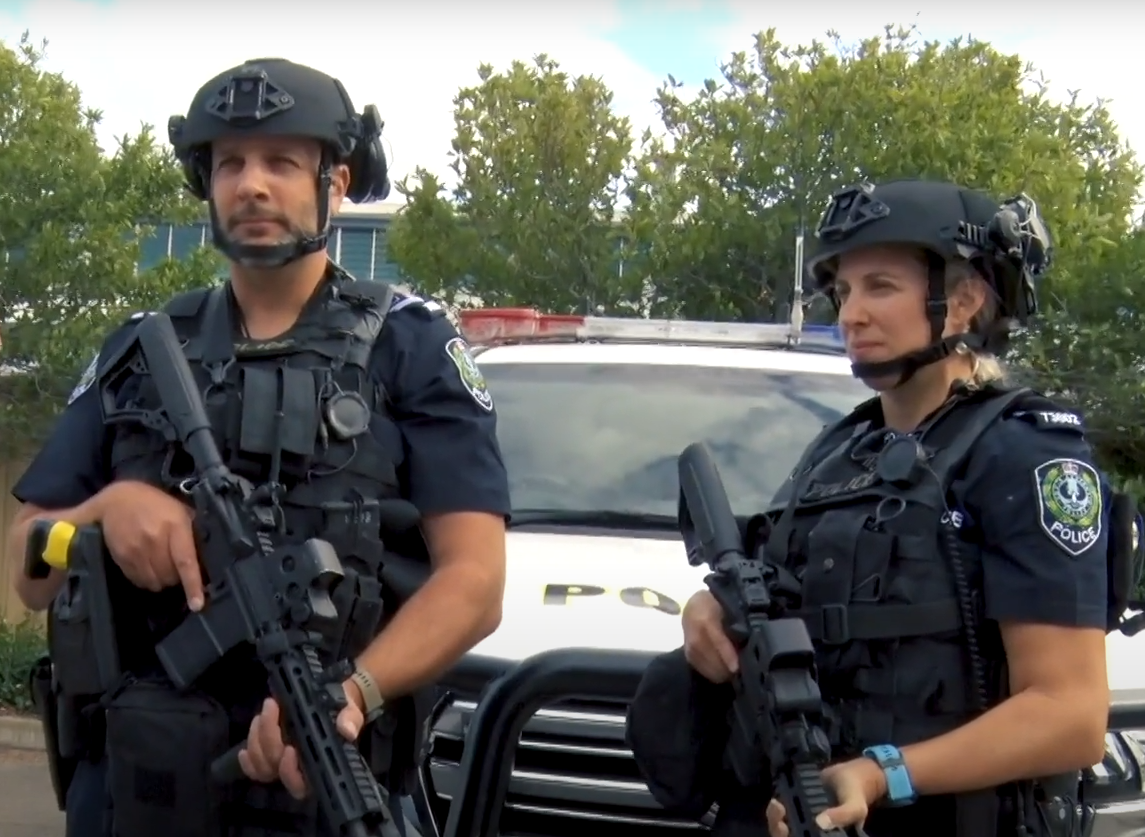
South Australia Police Security Response Section Officers

The Australia New Zealand Policing Advisory Agency (ANZPAA) was established in October 2007. ANZPAA is a joint initiative of the Australian and New Zealand Police Commissioners and is funded by contributions to Australia and New Zealand Police jurisdictions. ANZPAA is a non-operational policing agency that provides strategy and policy advice, and secretarial services to the ANZPAA Board on cross-jurisdictional policing initiatives that help enhance community safety and security. ANZPAA's strategic direction is set by ANZPAA’s board and the Australia New Zealand Council of Police Professionalisation (ANZCoPP, formerly Australasian Police Professional Standards Committee, APPSC).

The Australasian Police Professional Standards Committee (APPSC) was an organisation that served all police jurisdictions around Australia and New Zealand. It was the body for police education and training in Australia and New Zealand; the council comprising each of the police commissioners from Australia and New Zealand along with the president of the Police Federation of Australia and the president of the New Zealand Police Association. On 9 November 2007, APPSC roles and functions were amalgamated into ANZPAA. In 2013, APPSC was retitled to the Australia New Zealand Council of Police Professionalisation.

Crime Stoppers programs run in each state and on a national level. These programs collect information about crimes and pass them on to police, ensuring that the community can participate in fighting crime.

== Controversies ==
=== Colonial legacy ===
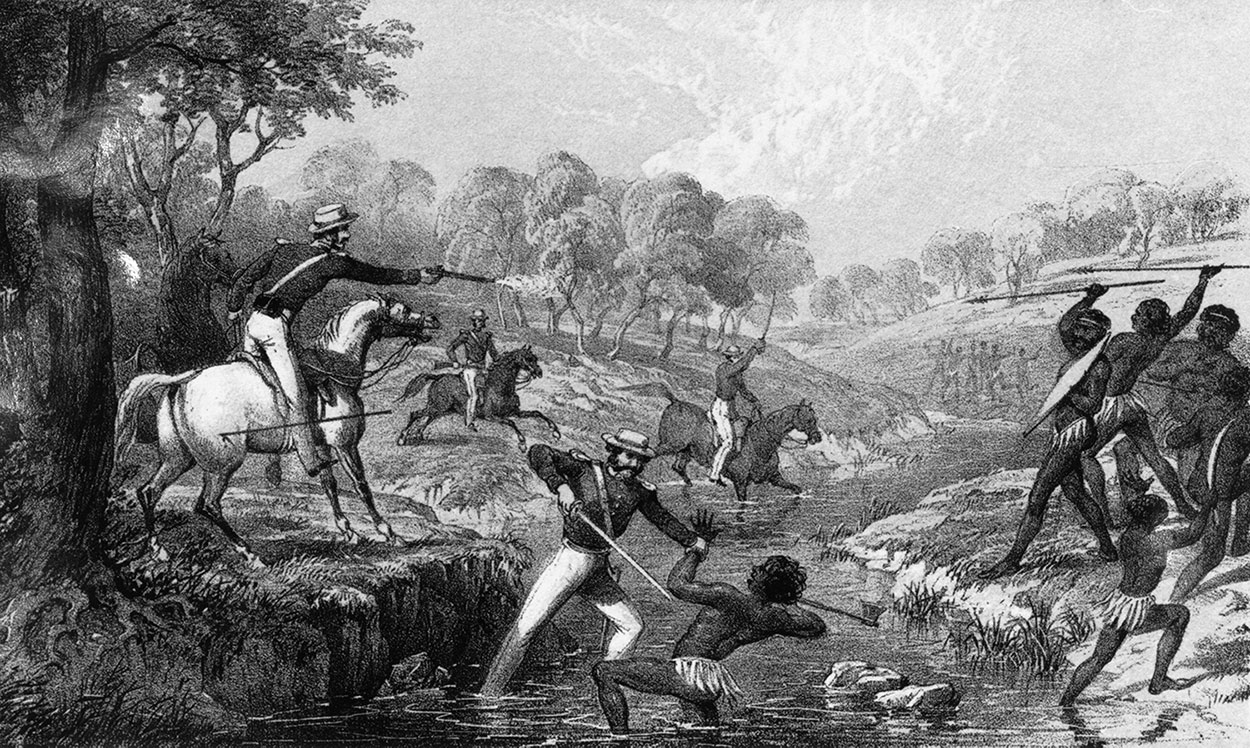
New South Wales Mounted Police engaging Aboriginal warriors during the Waterloo Creek massacre of 1838

Involvement of state law enforcement in suppressing Indigenous resistance to colonisation has been widely controversial. The New South Wales Mounted Police were formed following the Bathurst War between British colonists and the Wiradjuri people in 1824, and in modern Australia continue to be deployed as part of police presence at peaceful protests in many states.

Across colonial Australia, police forces were mobilised in violent conflict during the Australian frontier wars and were heavily involved in the many Indigenous fatalities that led to sharp decline of Indigenous populations since colonisation. The Queensland Native Police Force alone were responsible for an estimated 24,000 "violent Aboriginal deaths" between 1859 and 1897, as calculated by professor Raymond Evans in 2009.

In the Northern Territory, the Aboriginals Ordinance 1918 (Cth) allowed forced recruitment of Indigenous people and legal non-payment of wages, granting Protectors and police the right to uphold this arrangement.

=== Police misconduct and corruption ===
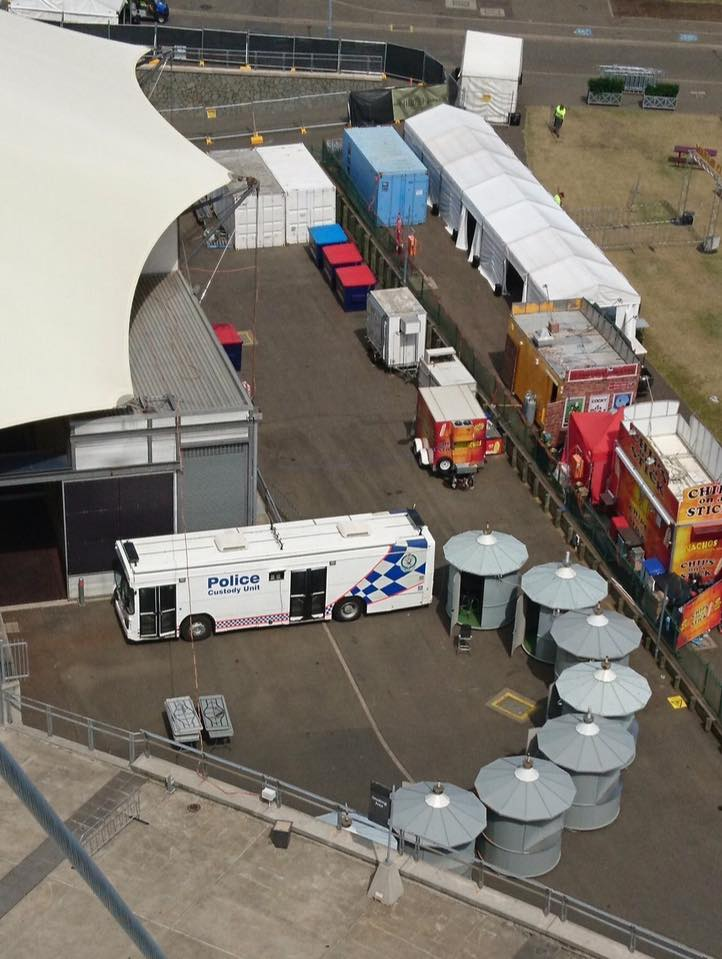
Ticket booths used to strip search patrons at a music festival in Sydney in 2019

In 1987, the Fitzgerald Inquiry was launched in response to allegations of misconduct within the Queensland Police Service, before later being expanded to investigate allegations of corruption within the Queensland Government. At the conclusion of the inquiry, several senior police figures and government ministers were charged and jailed for various corruption offences. The inquiry led to the resignation of then Queensland Premier Joh Bjelke-Petersen, who was later charged with perjury before the case was abandoned due to a hung jury.

In the mid-1990s, a Royal Commission was established to investigate allegations of corruption and misconduct within the New South Wales Police Service (later changed to New South Wales Police Force). The commission found that there was "systematic and entrenched" corruption within the organization, with adverse findings being made against 284 officers, seven of whom were jailed for various offences.

In 2001, New South Wales Police were given the power to deploy drug detection dogs at certain public locations across the state – namely at major events, train stations and licensed venues. More recently, the practice has been criticized due to reports of officers routinely using indications from drug detection dogs as a justification for conducting strip searches, particularly at major public events such as music festivals (see New South Wales Police Force Strip Search Scandal). In 2018, an inquiry was launched by the state's police watchdog, who found that in several cases, officers had acted unlawfully. In 2022, a class action pertaining to strip searches conducted at music festivals from July 2016 onward was filed in the state's Supreme Court.

== Transportation ==
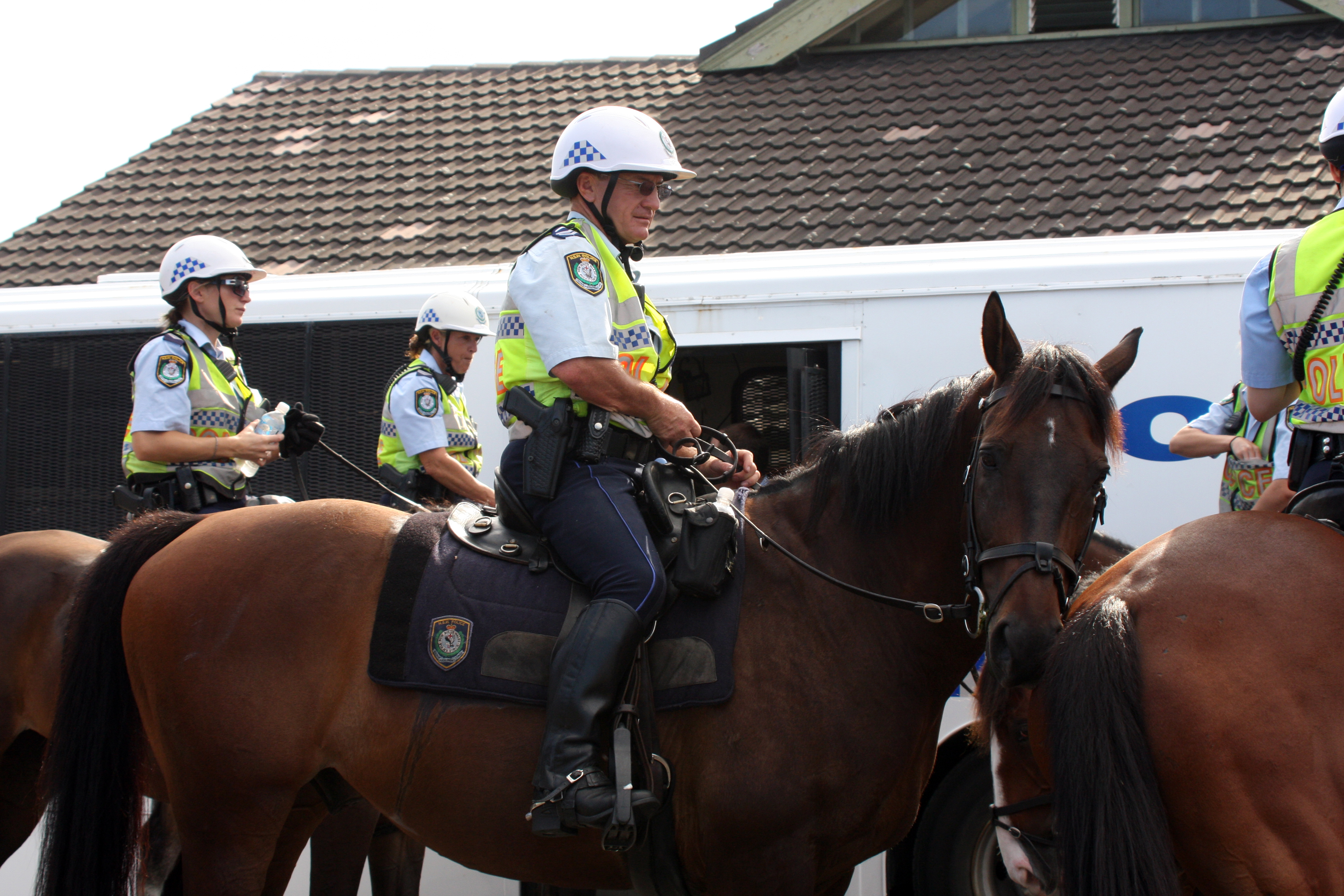
Mounted police officers in New South Wales

By agreement between the various commissioners, most police cars in Australia are predominantly white, with a blue and white Sillitoe tartan checkered strip on the side. Historically, police fleets were composed predominantly of domestically built models such as the Holden Commodore and Ford Falcon. With the demise of Holden and Ford production in Australia, fleets have grown to include models such as the Chrysler 300, BMW 5 Series, Kia Stinger, Volkswagen Passat, Mercedes-Benz E-Class, and Hyundai Sonata. Prisoner transport vehicles are based on light commercial vehicles such as the Ford Ranger, Toyota Hilux, Holden Colorado, Mercedes Vito, or Volkswagen Transporter.

A wide range of vehicles are used for unmarked purposes to blend in with civilian vehicles.

Emergency vehicle lighting differs across Australian jurisdictions and may vary based on law enforcement functions (e.g. parks compliance, fisheries, local law enforcement, etc.). However, primary law enforcement agencies utilise blue and red flashing warning lights.

Most Australian police services have mounted police units that are prominently used for ceremonial purposes, although in New South Wales, South Australia, Western Australia, and Victoria the mounted police also undertake operational policing duties.

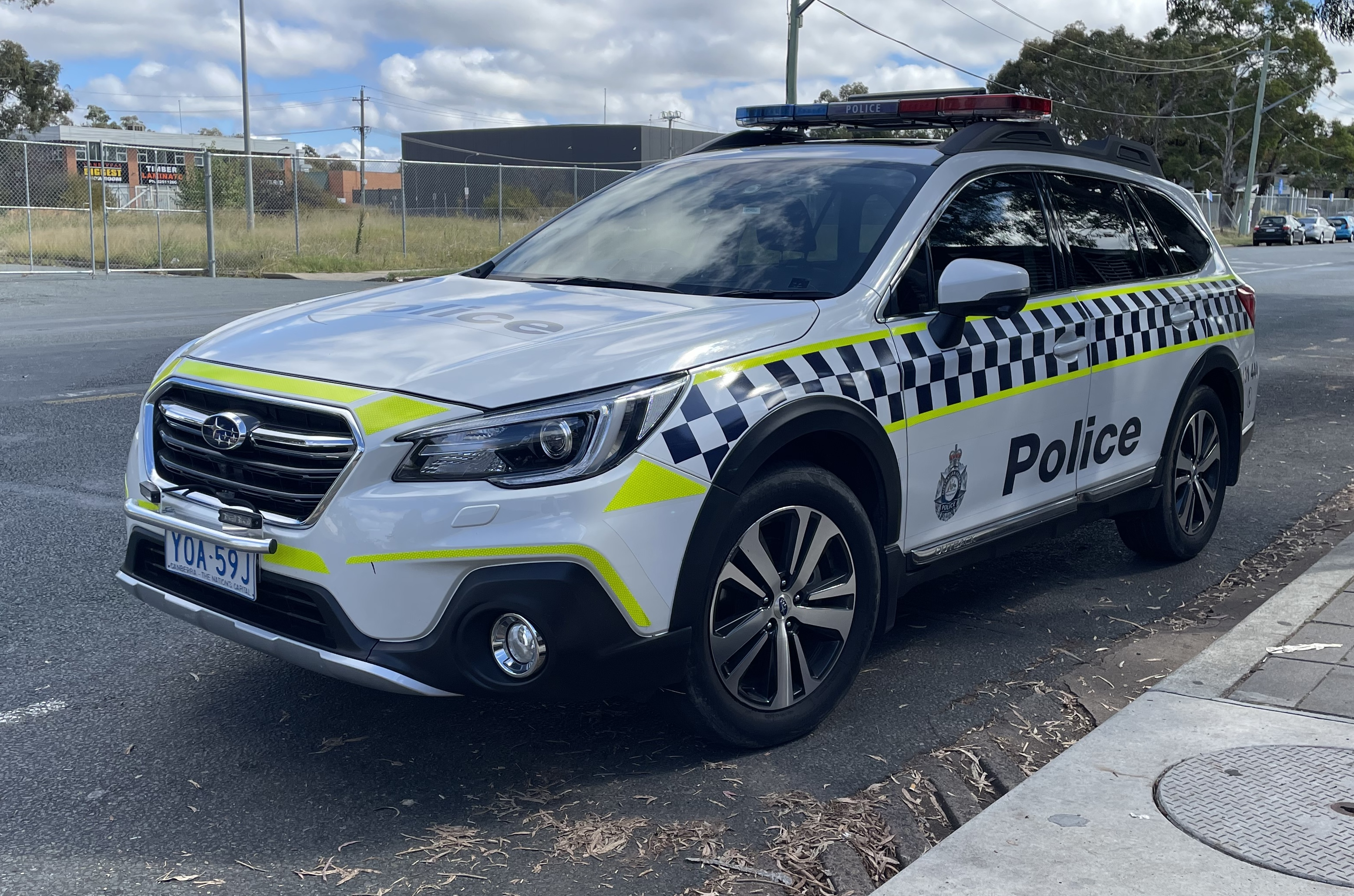
Australian Capital Territory Police Subaru Outback General Duties patrol car

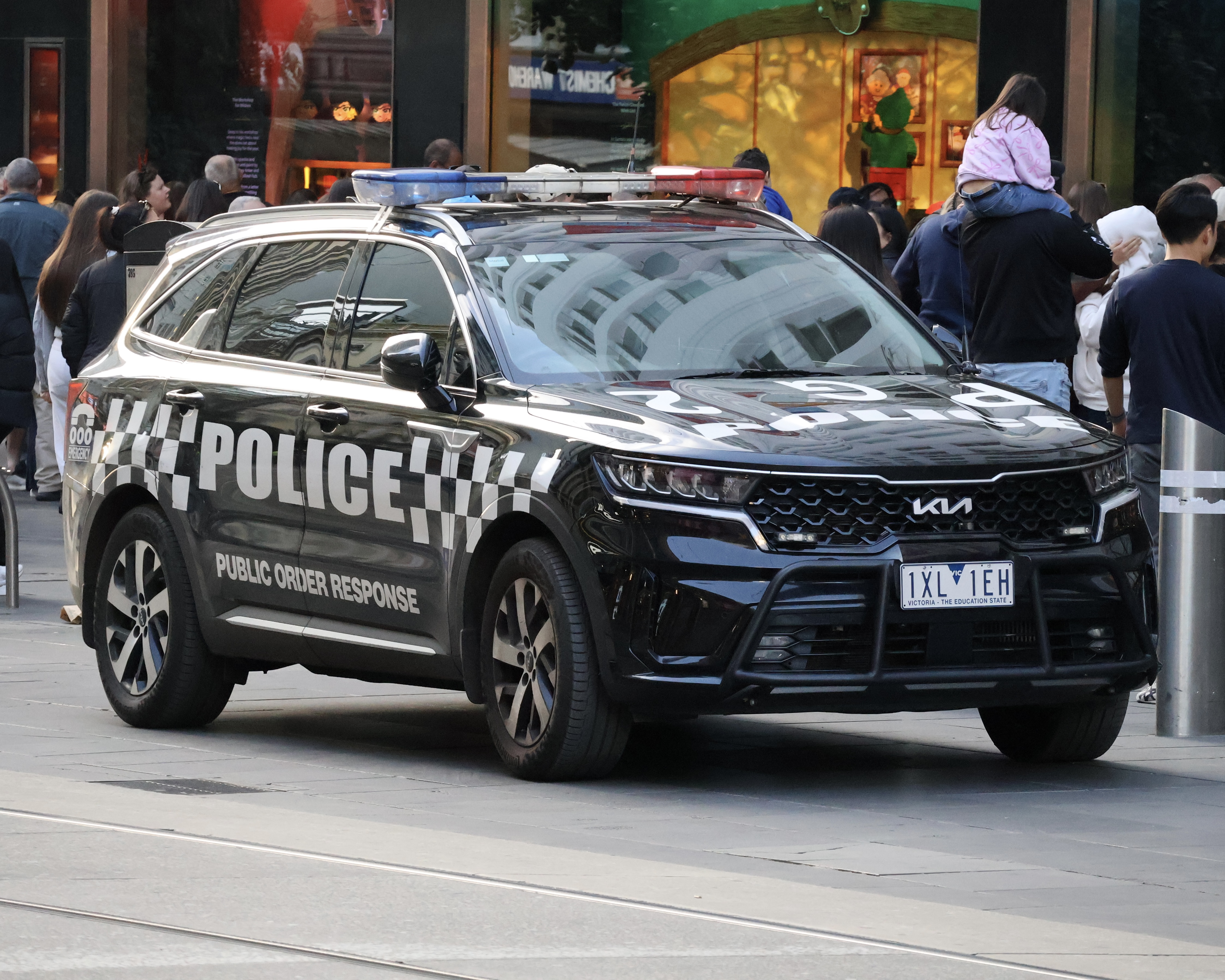
Kia Sorento Public Order Response riot car of Victoria Police

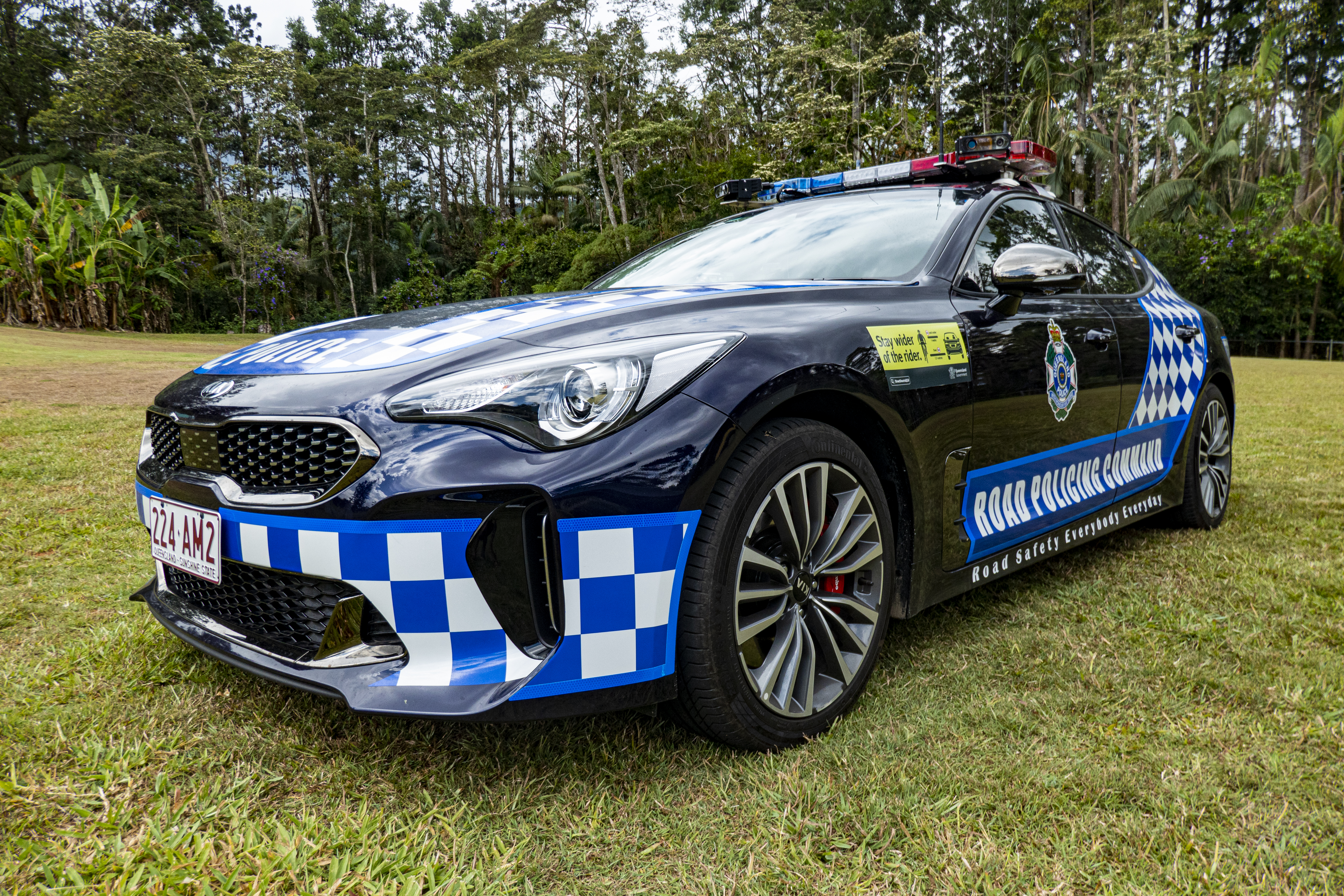
A Queensland Police Service Kia Stinger Highway Patrol car

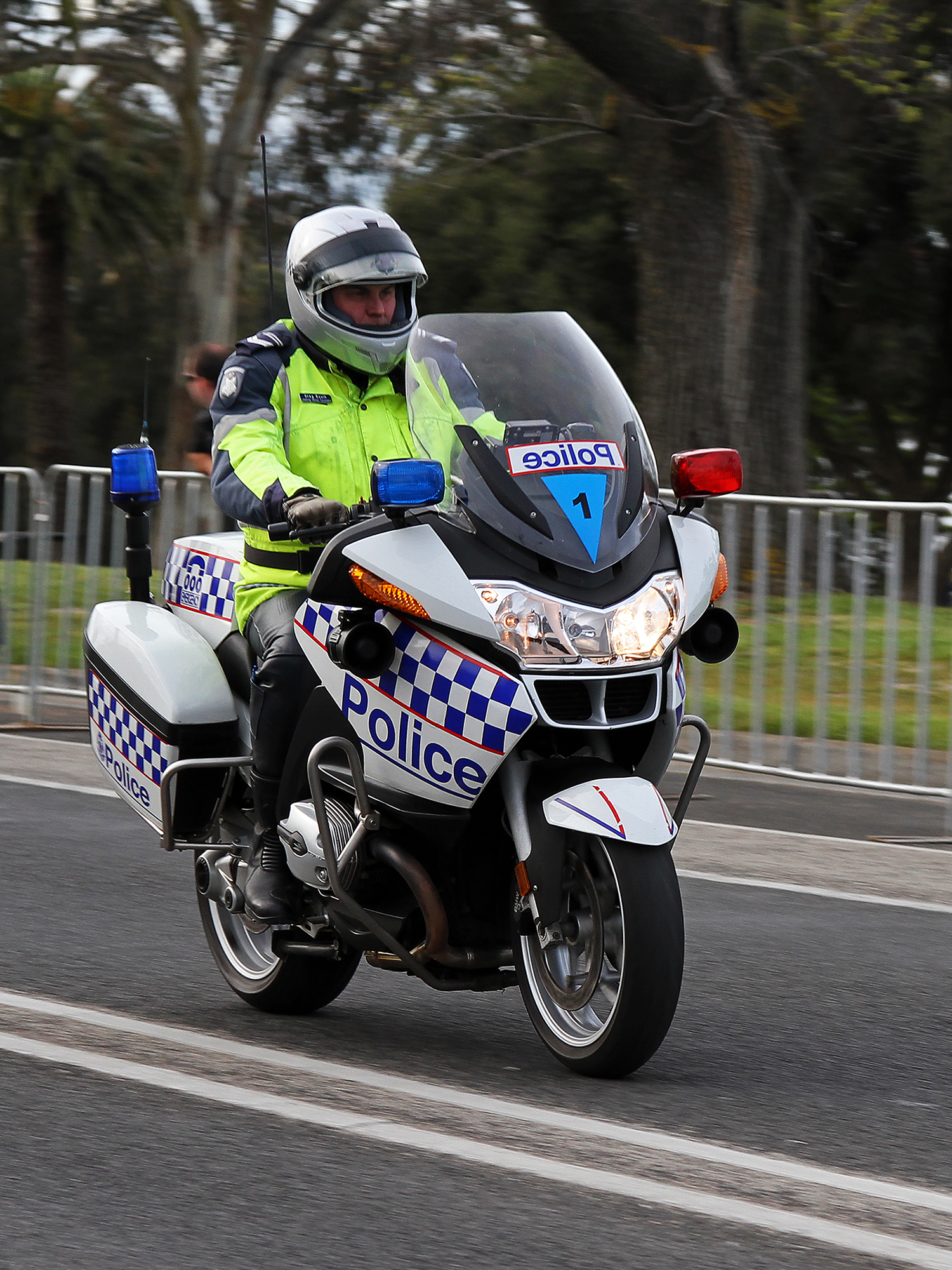
Victoria Police motorcycle

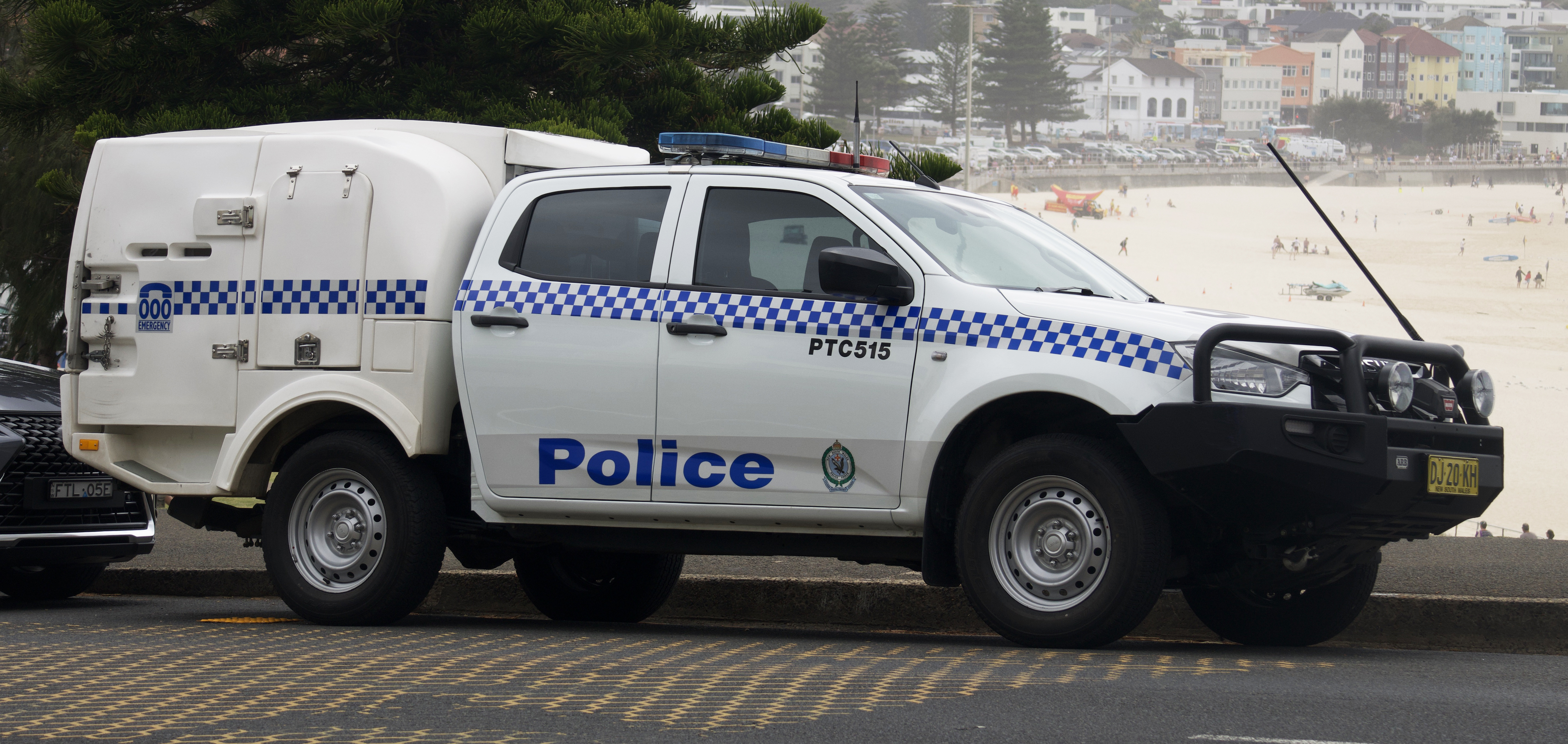
New South Wales Police Isuzu D-Max prisoner transport

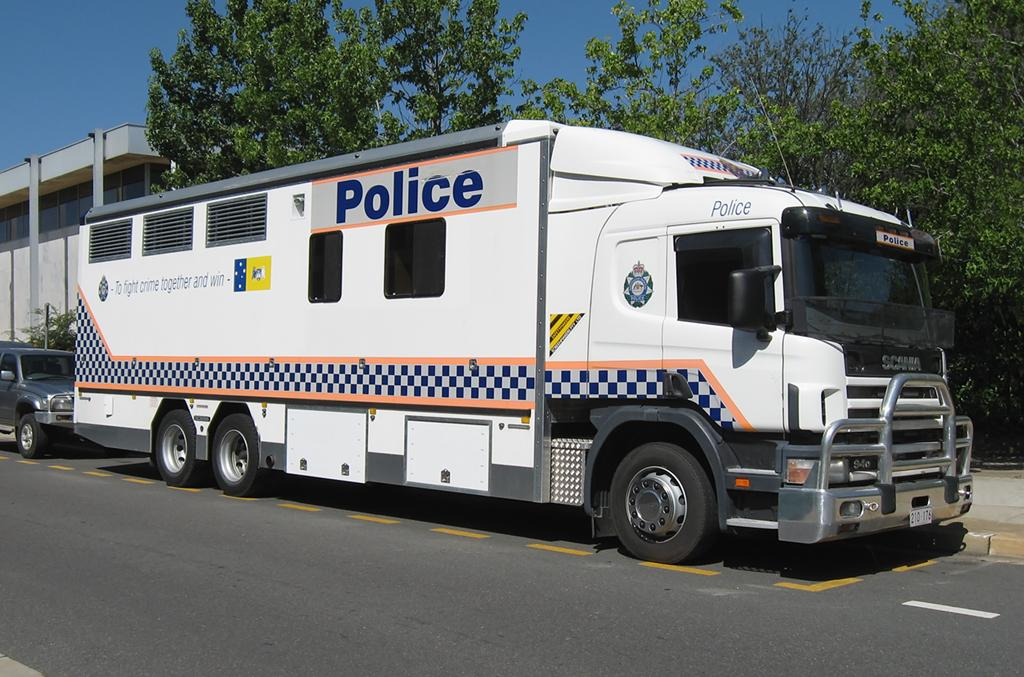
An ACT Policing Scania Mobile Command Unit

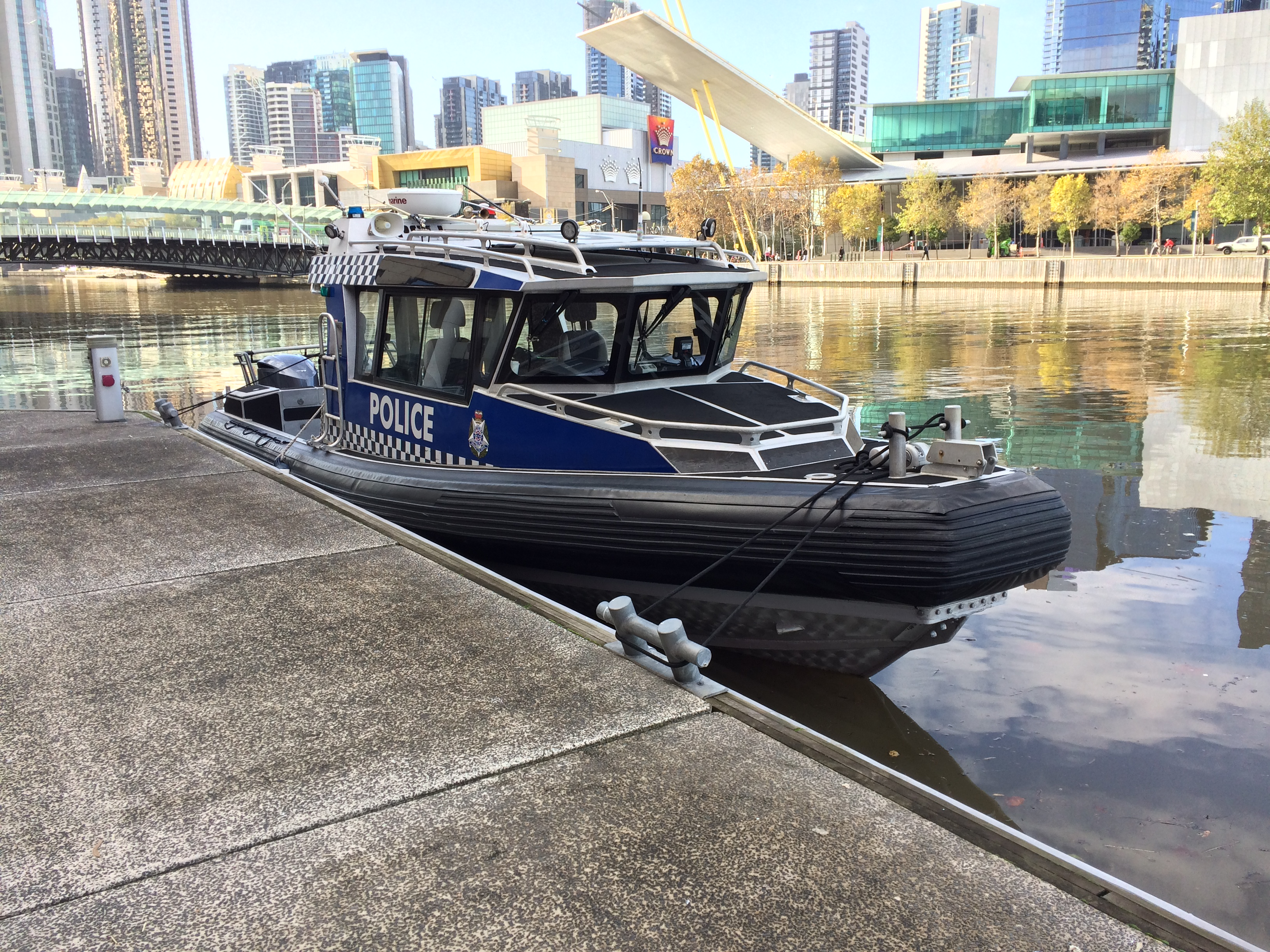
A Victoria Police marine operations boat in Melbourne

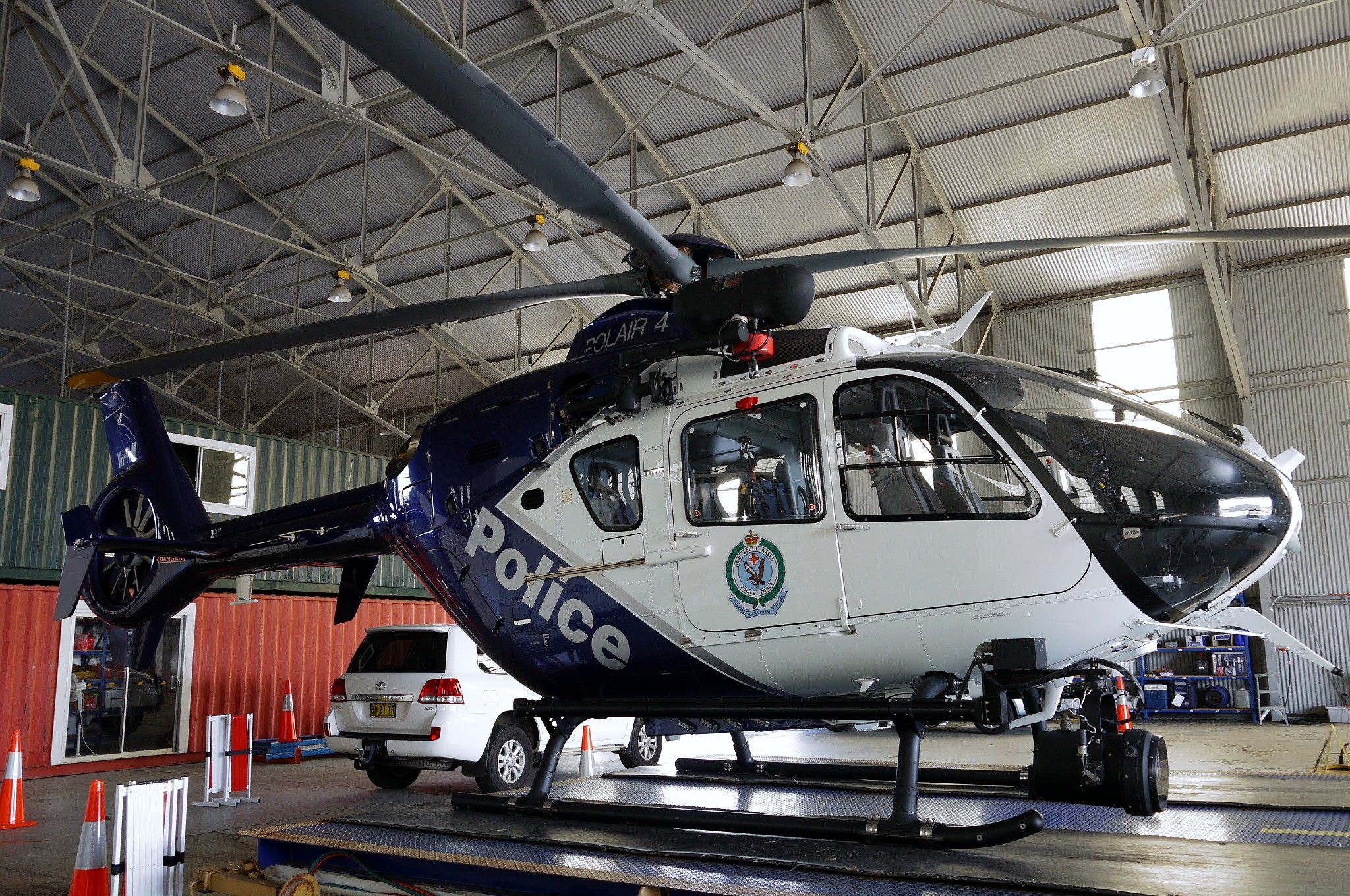
A New South Wales Police PolAir Eurocopter Helicopter

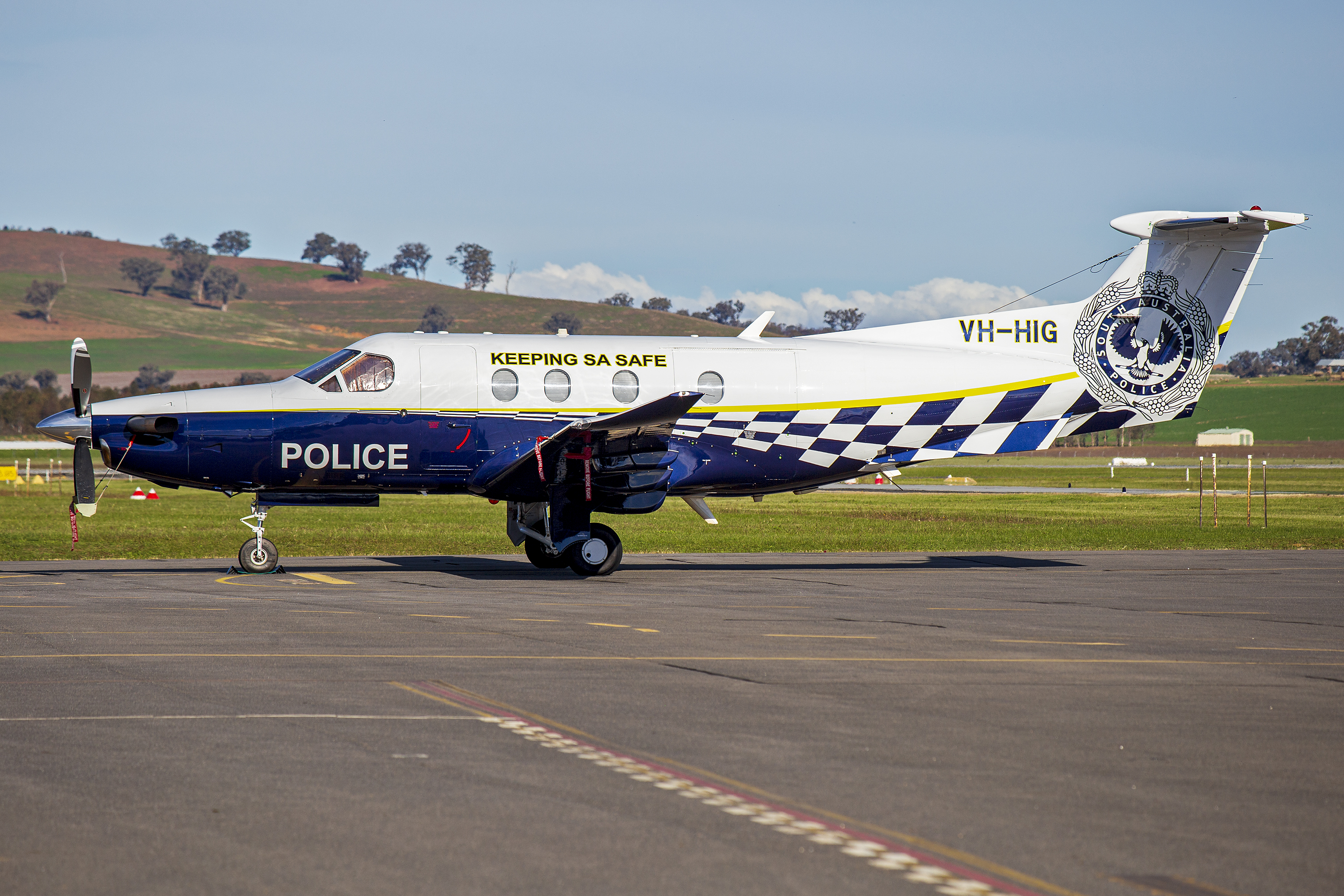
South Australia Police Pilatus airplane

== Defunct law enforcement agencies ==
=== Federal ===
- Commonwealth Police – Replaced by the Australian Federal Police
- Australian Protective Service – Merged into the Australian Federal Police
- Federal Bureau of Narcotics – Functions now performed by the Australian Federal Police and Australian Border Force
- Australian Customs and Border Protection Service – Merged with Immigration Detention and Compliance to form the Australian Border Force
- National Crime Authority – Replaced by the Australian Crime Commission then renamed to Australian Criminal Intelligence Commission
- Australian Commission for Law Enforcement Integrity (ACLI) – Was a statutory agency with the purpose of investigating corruption and misconduct in Federal Law Enforcement agencies. Replaced by the National Anti-Corruption Commission (NACC).

=== State/territory ===
- ACT Police Force – merged into the Australian Federal Police

== See also ==
- Australian court hierarchy
- Crime in Australia
- Immigration detention in Australia
- List of Australian prisons
- Punishment in Australia
- Reasonable and probable grounds in Australia
- Terrorism in Australia
