= Australian Defence Force Investigative Service =

Investigative arm of Australian Defence Force Police

- Badge of the ADF Investigative Service

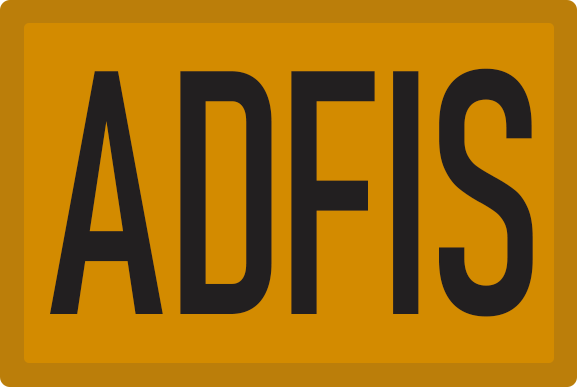
- Identification Arm Patch of the ADF Investigative Service
- Common name: ADF Investigative Service
- Abbreviation: ADFIS

Agency overview
- Formed: 16 May 2007
- Preceding agencies: Naval Police Naval Investigative Service (NIS); Military Police Special Investigations Branch (SIB); RAAF Security Police Service Investigations (SI)

Jurisdictional structure
- Federal agency: Australia
- Operations jurisdiction: Joint Military Police Force, Australian Defence Force, Australia
- Constituting instruments: Defence Force Discipline Act 1982; Defence Act 1903
- General nature: Federal law enforcement; Military police

Operational structure
- Overseen by: Office of the Provost Marshal - ADF
- Headquarters: Canberra
- Investigators: 150 (approx.)

The Australian Defence Force Investigative Service (ADFIS) is the unified investigative arm of the Australian Defence Force's Joint Military Police Unit. Initially formed in 2007 as a part of the service police, it was amalgamated into the Joint Military Police Force at the beginning of 2020. ADFIS is responsible for complex and major disciplinary and criminal investigations involving the Australian Defence Force (ADF), its assets, land, personnel and capabilities.

ADFIS is a tri-service unit composed of specialised service police personnel who are qualified to undertake investigations of serious and unique nature. As the successor to the previously active single-service police investigation units which it absorbed, it is staffed by military police officers from the Royal Australian Navy's Naval Police, Australian Army's Military Police and the Royal Australian Air Force's Air Force Police.

== History ==
Prior to the formation of ADFIS, each of the three service's police entities in the Australian Defence Force were responsible for maintaining their own general duties and investigative law enforcement functions. While each service would maintain its general duties personnel manning requirements separate to investigators, the investigations arm within each of the single-service police organisations were:

- Royal Australian Navy – Naval Police Naval Investigative Service (NIS)
- Australian Army – Military Police Special Investigations Branch (SIB)
- Royal Australian Air Force – RAAF Security Police Service Investigations (SI)

From as early as 1998, multiple inquiries have been conducted into the Australian military justice system, the ADF's investigative capability, and the ability of ADF service police as a whole to perform their role effectively. On 16 June 2005 the Senate's Foreign Affairs, Defence and Trade References Committee released a report titled 'The Effectiveness of Australia's Military Justice System'. This report would go on to make a number of recommendations which would, in turn, spark the ADF to commence its own internal audit on its investigative capability.

In July 2006, the ADF released the report 'Report on an Audit of the Australian Defence Force Investigative Capability'. Both this report and the Foreign Affairs, Defence and Trade References Committee's report identified and addressed institutionalised and widespread issues amongst the service police organisations, including under-staffing, inadequate training, lack of resources, lack of engagement with civilian police agencies and other entities in the military justice system, poor direction and leadership, just to name a few.

Both reports identified the need for a tri-service ADF investigative capability in order to consolidate personnel, effort and resources into one location. In light of these recommendations, the position of the Provost Marshal - ADF (PM-ADF) was formed under ADF HQ and outside of the single-service chains of command. On 16 May 2007, a new organisation under the name of the Australian Defence Force Investigative Service would be formed with the PM-ADF as its commander.

The formation of ADFIS saw the end to single-service dedicated investigative capabilities in the ADF, hence the Naval Investigative Service and Army SIB ceased to exist. The then RAAF Security Police would have its investigative elements transitioned to ADFIS, while continuing to provide uniformed organic security and general policing services to the Air Force, under Air Force command. The Naval Police and Military Police would continue to provide uniformed general policing and law enforcement to the Navy and Army respectively, also under their single-service commands.

== Functions and responsibilities ==
By doctrine, the role of ADFIS was to assist the Chief of the Defence Force (CDF) and service chiefs in maintaining discipline in the ADF through the lawful, ethical and effective investigation of matters involving persons subject to the Defence Force Discipline Act 1982.

In the 'Establishment of the Interim Australian Defence Force Investigative Service' (CDF Directive No 07/2007), ADFIS' functions were described as:

- Inquire into matters involving Defence members and Defence civilians and collect relevant material to a standard acceptable for use, if required, by competent ADF and civilian authorities
- Maintain a Service Police Central Records Office (SPCRO) with the capability to inform CDF, VCDF, the service chiefs and other authorities (by request) of results and trends in overall ADF and single-service discipline and investigation matters
- Maintain a police intelligence capability to support ADF and single-service investigations and operations and take effective crime prevention measures
- Monitor developments in Australian civil and allied military law enforcement in order to adjust ADFIS policy and procedures as required to maintain best investigative practice and standards
- Facilitate enhanced cooperation with relevant government departments or organisations, in particular federal, state and territory police agencies
- Provide support to the PM-ADF in undertaking policy, doctrine, training representational and general policing-related activity

ADFIS' investigative and operational responsibilities include:

- Investigation of service offences
- Assistance to CDF commissions of inquiry
- Support to operations as directed by CDF
- Forensic or other support to investigations conducted by other DIAs
- Any matters directed by the CDF

== Organisational structure ==
The initial construct of ADFIS saw an ADFIS HQ element based out of Canberra that reported to the Office of the Provost Marshal ADF. ADFIS HQ would maintain administrative-related departments focused on personnel management and training, as well as policy and doctrine development. It would also maintain the Service Police Intelligence Office (SPIO) and the Service Police Central Records Office (SPCRO) for the entire ADF service police capability, until both SPIO and SPCRO would be transferred to the Joint Service Police Group (later renamed the Joint Military Police Unit) in 2017.

Under an operations element, ADFIS would maintain four regional HQ elements around Australia:

- HQ Eastern Region (NSW/ACT)
- HQ Northern Region (QLD)
- HQ Western/Central Region (WA/NT)
- HQ Southern Region (VIC)

Within each region would be multiple Joint Investigations Offices (JIOs). A JIO would consist of a 'JIO Commander', normally a Warrant Officer Class 2 (or Navy/RAAF equivalent rank), and a team of investigators. JIOs would be situated on Navy, Army and Air Force installations around the country in more prominent ADF areas, with the JIO itself often co-located at or near the general duties service police station for the garrison of its location.

Most permanent ADFIS JIOs were located in mainland Australia. One main exception to this was the Joint Investigations Office - Butterworth, which was located on the Royal Malaysian Air Force Base Butterworth in Penang, Malaysia. RMAF Butterworth is home to multiple permanent ADF units, hence its requirement for a permanent Australian service police presence.

== Selection and training ==
Selection to attend the Australian Defence Force Investigators Course (ADFIC) was based on preference as well as merit within current posted unit and position. Although not always required, most people that would attend the Investigators course would be currently serving General Duties service police personnel from the three individual service police organisations. Although ADFIS was a tri-service unit, career progression requirements still remained a single-service police organisation responsibility. This meant that Naval Police, Military Police and Air Force Police personnel all had varying pre-requisites and requirements in terms of time in service, experience and minimum rank needed to attend the course.

In most circumstances, an individual would express their interest in attending ADFIC, before performing on-the-job training and being deemed suitable by an ADFIS team. Once deemed suitable, the individual would attend the course at the Defence Force School of Policing (Australia). Upon completion of the course, members were awarded a Diploma in Government Investigations, a civilian recognised qualification in Australia. This allowed ADFIS investigators to possess the skills and training to be on par with their civilian counterparts.

== Dress and insignia ==
Standard dress within ADFIS varied based on the duties and tasks being completed by an investigator at any given time. Within Australia, it was fairly common for investigators to simply wear a suit or similar business attire, much how a civilian police detective would in the course of their duties. The benefit afforded to investigators of wearing business attire while performing investigative police functions within the military is the 'removal of the uniform' or the promoted differentiation between investigators and other military personnel that they investigate. This is especially useful when an investigator of subordinate rank is required to interview an individual of greater rank, due to the interviewee not necessarily viewing the investigator as a military subordinate but rather an impartial police member.

When required to wear a uniform in a barracks/garrison environment, single service dress standards would apply. This would equate to the standard barracks camouflage uniform of each service that any other sailor, soldier or airman would wear, with the RACMP Corps beret for investigators belonging to Army as members of the Royal Australian Corps of Military Police. Personnel would wear the standard ANF/single-service ensign on their left sleeve, with the ADFIS identification arm patch (IAP) being worn on the right sleeve of the uniform irrespective of service. The ADFIS IAP contained the letters "ADFIS" in black on an orange background and was about 7.5cm in width and 5.5cm in height to fit the Army and Air Force standard patch size, and slightly wider for the Navy to fit the Navy uniform patch size.

A subdued variant of the ADFIS identification arm patch was created and matched the standard IAP however contained the "ADFIS" lettering in black on a tan background instead of orange. This patch was designed for wear in the field environment or overseas on operations where field or combat orders of dress were required to be worn by investigators due to the nature of their given tasks or operational requirements.

All ADFIS investigators carried a wallet badge which was generally issued at the completion of the Australian Defence Force Investigators Course and upon taking up a posting in an investigator position within ADFIS. The badge was metal with blue enamel behind the text and came in a leather wallet accompanied by an ID card identifying the individual possessing it as an investigator within ADFIS. The badge was standard throughout ADFIS and was issued to all investigators irrespective of service or rank. Upon retiring or leaving ADFIS, members could request to keep their badge as a token of memorabilia.

== Equipment and vehicles ==
While conducting their duties, investigators would normally carry the standard Saflok MKIV handcuffs and ASP expandable baton issued to all ADF service police for operational use. While wearing business attire, this equipment would generally be carried in leather 'detective-styled' pouches that would attach directly to their pant belt.

Like all other ADF service police personnel from the time period of its existence, ADFIS investigators did not routinely carry firearms while on duty domestically in Australia.

ADFIS investigators would generally be allocated and utilise unmarked vehicles in the course of their duties. Purpose-built vehicles would come outfitted with fixed red and blue lights in the dash, front grille, rear deck or rear number plate areas depending on application, as well as sirens. In line with most service fleet vehicles, they would often be white or silver and would have standard ADF military number plates. The benefit to this system was any standard unmarked service fleet vehicle could be utilised by investigators for temporary unmarked police duties by simply utilising removable red and blue dash-mounted lights or other temporary emergency lighting systems.

== Transition to JMPF ==
In January 2020, the raising of the Joint Military Police Unit occurred after a First Principles review into the ADF's service police commenced in 2017. After 13 years of service, ADFIS was officially amalgamated into the Joint Military Police Force (within the Joint Military Police Unit), to form its operational investigative component.

== See also ==
- Military police
- Royal Australian Corps of Military Police
- Joint Military Police Unit (Australia)
- Law enforcement in Australia
