= Reasonable and probable grounds in Australia =

Part of Australian law

In Australian criminal law, reasonable and probable grounds most prominently regulates police officers as a precondition of the exercise of certain powers in their function as enforcers of the law. Based on Australian common law, it is a prerequisite of most police powers (including arresting without a warrant, searching without a warrant, requesting disclosure of identity, and investigating terrorist activity). In Canada, it is defined as the point where probability replaces suspicion based on a reasonable belief; reasonableness is a legitimate expectation in the existence of specific facts, and the belief in individual circumstances can be "reasonable without being probable." Less-clearly defined in Australia, it depends on the circumstances of a case and often involves an assessment of the circumstances of a potential crime.

Law has an overarching doctrine of reasonableness. It is derived from a hypothetical reasonable person, a standard by which a law is explained to a jury. The reasonable person, and reasonableness itself, extends to the concept of reasonable and probable grounds as a justification for the exercise of power (or discretion). Reasonable and probable grounds differ from that of the reasonable person and the test of reason. Some state and federal common-law judgments and statutory authorities explicitly refer to "reasonable and probable grounds". The concept, introduced to the Australian legal system at the turn of the 21st century, is evolving and sometimes inconsistent.

== Development in common law ==
The scales of justice

Reasonable and probable grounds have evolved from common-law judgments, employing judicial discretion to make a balanced ruling. Two principles guide the reasonable and probable grounds necessary to act on certain powers: reasonable suspicion and reasonable necessity.

=== Reasonable suspicion ===
Reasonable suspicion, the legal standard which must be met before police officers can exercise certain powers, is based on information in the mind of the police officer at the time a power is wielded. Less than a reasonable belief, it is more than a possibility. It is not arbitrary. Australia is a state party to the International Covenant on Civil and Political Rights that specifies the protection from arbitrary arrest and detention by the Article 9 making the multi-nation agreement domestic law in Australia.

The concept has been reaffirmed in the common law since the 20th century, and is one of the bases of reasonable and probable grounds to exercise the police powers of search and arrest and other discretionary powers. There are ten propositions of how a person may have a reasonable suspicion in the preliminary stage of an investigation, and the court determines whether the grounds for reasonable suspicion exist. The propositions are:

1. Sufficient facts to induce suspicion in a reasonable person
2. Belief formed by the arresting person
3. Accountability of the arresting officer
4. A factual basis for suspicion
5. Objective circumstances pointing clearly to the belief
6. A mental inclination to assent to (rather than reject) a belief
7. What was known and reasonably able to be known at the relevant time
8. A belief that can be based on external information, but cannot be directive
9. Sources used to form a belief must be identifiable to the court
10. The executive discretion of police officers to arrest can only be questioned if the validity of the decision to arrest was not effectively exercised.

=== Reasonable necessity ===
What constitutes reasonable and probable grounds in the common law is revealed from what is reasonably necessary: an obligation which develops in the mind of a police officer to wield the relevant police power.

== Statutory development ==
Police, on reasonable and probable grounds, can exercise discretionary powers including arrest, searches, requests for identity and investigating terrorist activity. These powers are conferred with legislation regulating police officers (such as the Law Enforcement [Powers and Responsibilities] Act 2002 for New South Wales) or regulating specific powers, such as the Terrorism (Police Powers) Act 2002 (also NSW). Regardless of the type of police power, reasonable grounds is the only doctrine with which police officers can function as law enforcers.

=== Arrest without a warrant ===
Police have the power to arrest, without a warrant, on reasonable and probable grounds. This is preserved by statutory reforms, creating a legal standard in section 99 of the Law Enforcement (Powers and Responsibilities) Act 2002 (NSW). Reasonable grounds for making such an arrest involves what is reasonably necessary for the relevant situation, an objective test by which police officers must be satisfied that an arrest is the best conceivable option. The common law requires that this power be exercised only as a last resort, where it is necessary to deprive an individual of freedom.

=== Search without a warrant ===
Similar to the power of arrest, police can search a person, vehicle or premises without a warrant on reasonable and probable grounds. Although the grounds do not specifically require reasonable necessity, it is implied by common law. This power is preserved by section 21 of the Law Enforcement (Powers and Responsibilities) Act (NSW). The reasonable grounds by which a police officer exercises the search of a person, vehicle or premises is legitimized for the purposes of discovering (and preserving) evidence.

=== Disclosure of identity ===
With reasonable grounds, police have the power to require a person to disclose their identity if the person can assist them in investigating alleged indictable offences. There is also an implied power in the common law to verify someone's identity in circumstances where police can request this information. This power, less contentious than arresting or searching without a warrant, is subject to reasonable and probable grounds to protect the human rights to privacy and dignity.

=== Investigating terrorist activity ===
A recent expansion in the scope of reasonable and probable grounds is the addition of police powers to investigate terrorist activity and authorize processes to prevent terrorist acts. This is authorized by the Terrorism (Police Powers) Act 2002 (NSW) at the state level and the Australian Federal Police Act 1979 (Cth) at the commonwealth (federal) level, which identify police powers (such as requiring disclosure of identity, searching a person, vehicle or premises, seizing and detaining evidence, and the use of force) which can be exercised in any situation where a terrorist act has occurred or could occur.

== Legal-system use evaluation ==
Reasonable and probable grounds is generally based on tests of objectivity, incorporating rationality and proportionality. The role of an officer in exercising police powers is to ensure that relevant reasonable and probable grounds exist to justify the exercise of power. Its practicality is an issue, since it is open to interpretation and depends on the person exercising the power.

The most contentious powers of police officers, arrest and search, involve human rights such as the right to liberty and privacy. An incorrect presumption by police officers of reasonable and probable grounds for the exercise of power risks the encroachment or violation of those rights. The death of Beto Laudisio involved inappropriate, disproportionate use of force in the police officers' arrest Roberto Curti. The legitimacy and legality of the reasonable and probable grounds to use force in the attempt to arrest Curti was undermined by irrationality and poor assessment of the situation. The arrest of a disability pensioner in Melbourne was reported by the Australian Broadcasting Corporation; six police officers tackled and arrested the man in a demonstration of police brutality and the misjudgment which may occur in the exercise of reasonable and probable grounds.

Legislation has been reformed in an attempt to clarify the boundaries of reasonable and probable grounds. The most prominent reform, in 2013, narrowed the grounds of reasonableness and probability with a twofold test which police officers must satisfy before making an arrest without a warrant. Police officers may arrest a person if they suspect, on reasonable grounds, that an offence may be (or has been) committed. Officers must be satisfied that the arrest is reasonably necessary to prevent the commission of another offence, to protect the victims, witnesses and community, and to ensure that the offence is dealt with properly and justly.

The use of reasonable grounds with respect to terrorism has been criticized because of its arbitrary abuse to justify undue searches and detentions of persons in public places at risk of "large-scale public disorder". This is primarily the result of inconsistent interpretations of reasonable grounds. In 2017 and 2018, terrorism laws were reformed in the extent and scope of police powers to improve protection. Concerns exist, however, that the introduction of "extraordinary" police powers broadens the scope of reason to exercise power to a degree disproportionate to the possibility of an offence; a person without a criminal record, for example, can be arrested and detained for up to four days.

== Comparison with other legal systems ==
As in Canada, reasonable grounds are articulated in the law as a standard by which police can lawfully arrest and search a person. In Canada, this standard has both objective and subjective reasoning behind it; in Australia, however, the extent of the subjectivity of reasonable grounds is unclear. The Canadian system of police powers on reasonable and probable grounds is more clearly defined; a tip from an informer reporting a crime is insufficient to establish reasonable and probable grounds. In Australia it depends on the circumstances of the case, rather than on the reasonable and probable grounds itself.

In the United States, the doctrine of probable cause governs the exercise of police powers and is argued as differing from reasonableness in preventing random and unnecessary searches. This is reaffirmed in the Fourth Amendment of the U.S. Constitution, and differs from Australian legislative amendments and common law.

== See also ==
- Rule of reason
- Jurisdiction

== Sources ==
- Gray, Anthony, The rule of law and reasonable suspicion (2011) 16(2) Australian Journal of Human Rights 53. doi:10.1080/1323238X.2011.11910888
- Brown, David; Farrier, David; McNamara, Luke; Steel, Alex & Grewcocket, Michael (2015). Criminal Laws: Materials and commentary on criminal law and process in NSW (6th ed.). Federation Press. ISBN 9781862879843.
- LexisNexis, Halsbury’s Laws of Australia, (online at 5 February 2015) 320 Police and Emergency Services, ‘2 Functions and Powers of Police’ [235]-[400].
- Skolnik, Terry. "The Suspicious Distinction between Reasonable Suspicion and Reasonable Grounds to Believe".’ (2016) 47(1) Ottawa Law Review 223–249.
