= Joint Military Police Unit =

Unified military police agency of the Australian Defence Force

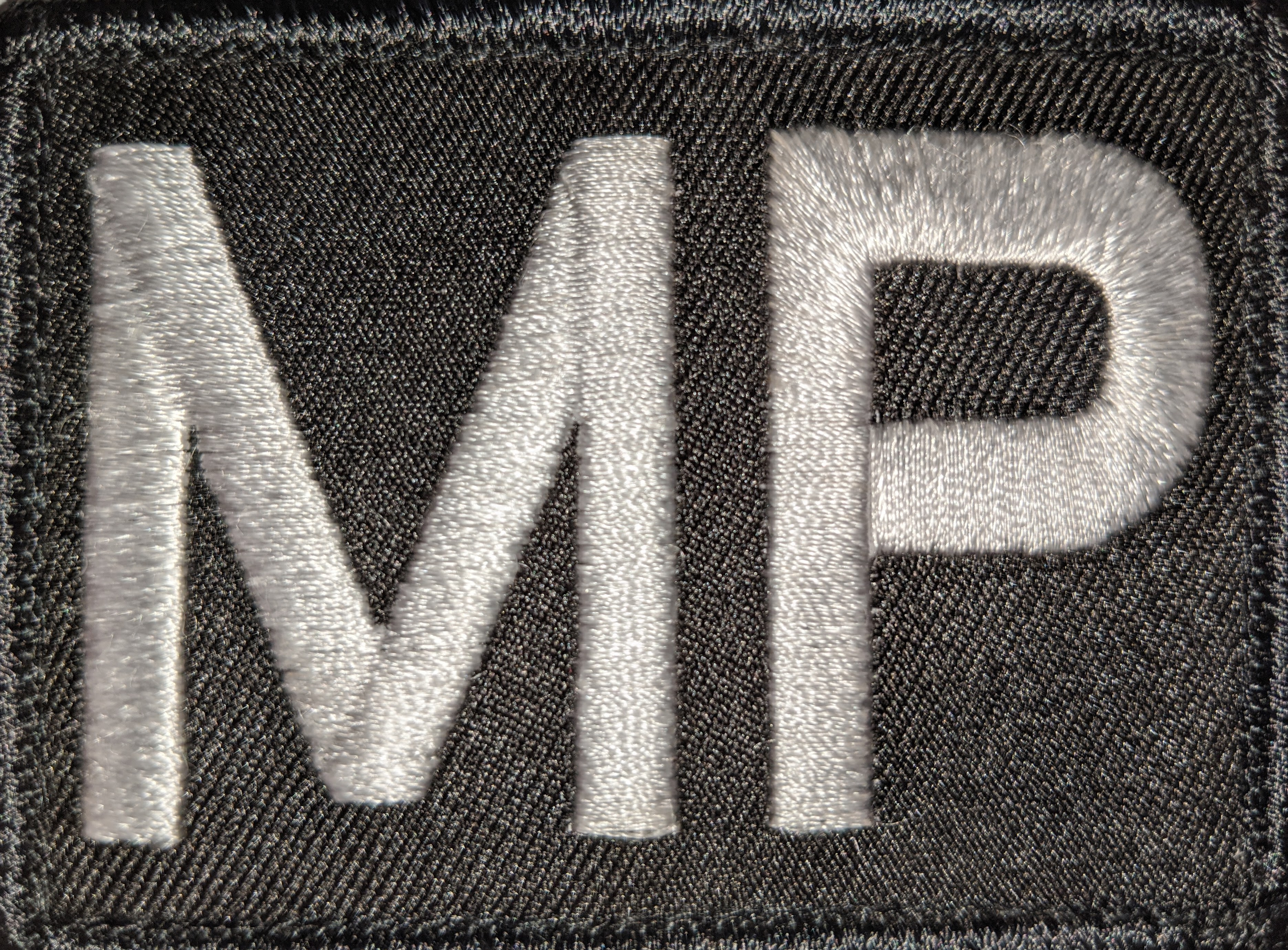
- JMPU patch
- Abbreviation: JMPU

Agency overview
- Formed: 1 March 2018

Jurisdictional structure
- Operations jurisdiction: Australia
- Legal jurisdiction: Australian Defence Force
- General nature: Military police

Operational structure
- Agency executive: Captain (RAN) Glenn Kerr, Provost Marshal & Commander Joint Military Police Unit
- Parent agency: Joint Capabilities Group
- Child agency: Australian Defence Force Investigative Service; Royal Australian Corps of Military Police; Naval Police; Royal Australian Air Force Security Police

Website
- defence.gov.au/JCG/JMPU/

The Joint Military Police Unit (formerly the Joint Service Police Group) is the unified military police agency of the Australian Defence Force. The Joint Military Police Unit is led by the Provost Marshal who reports to the Chief of Joint Capabilities responsible for general policing, law enforcement, and the Australian Defence Force Investigative Service.

== History ==
=== Joint Military Police Unit ===
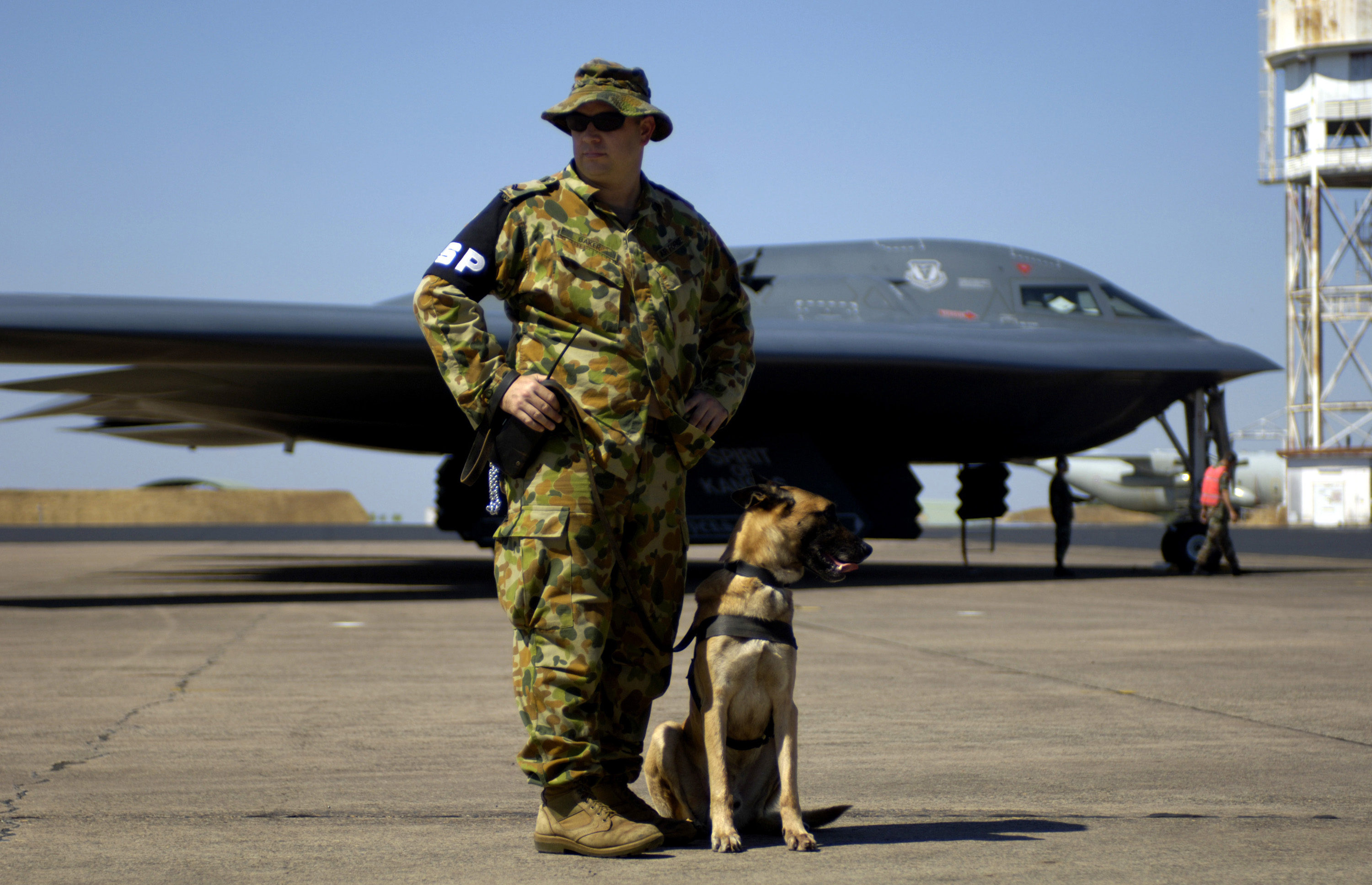
RAAF - Security Police K-9 Handler guarding a B-2 Spirit bomber of the U.S Air Force.

The Joint Military Police Unit was formed on 1 March 2018 after renaming the Joint Service Police Group and integrating the Australian Defence Force Investigative Service.

In January 2020, the General Duties policing capability went online and adopted all domestic policing functions within Navy, Army and Air Force bases Australia-wide.

The JMPU is currently in a 'test and adjust' period regarding Standard Operating Procedures and the employment of new equipment such as stab-proof vests, oleoresin capsicum spray and purpose-built Holden Colorado police vehicles (modelled from Victoria Police vehicles).

== Responsibilities ==
The Provost Marshal of the Australian Defence Force serves concurrently as the Commander of the Joint Military Police Unit exercising technical control and authority over all joint and single service policing capabilities such as Naval Police Coxswain at sea, Air Force Police, and Royal Australian Corps of Military Police. The support to combat operations remains as single service capabilities.

JMPU is responsible for assessing all reportable incidents (both domestic and international) where there is suspicion of a civilian or Service offence having been committed. If a reasonable suspicion of a Service offence exists, JMPU will notify the suspect's Unit that they have decided to commence an independent investigation. If a reasonable suspicion of a civilian offence is established, the relevant State/Territory police agency will be informed.

Although individual military units may conduct their own investigation (referred to as a 'Fact Finding Investigation') and proceed to charge the suspected member without the support of the JMPU, it is common for Units to request an investigation by the JMPU in cases that deal with moderate and serious level offending.

== Structure ==
The JMPU is made up of two distinct areas: General Duties Policing and the Australian Defence Force Investigative Service. The JMPU includes a records office, a digital forensic unit, a forensic services branch, a fraud and debt recoveries unit, and a legal section. The Joint Military Police Unit also maintains a Modernisation and Training Directorate consistent with the wider Defence outcomes of force modernisation. This Directorate is however staffed on a part-time basis.

== Insignia ==
All members of the Joint Military Police Unit regardless of their parent organisation (Navy, Army or Air Force), are required to wear the patch shown below whilst wearing Dress Order No 4A ‘General Duty Dress' (Australian Multi-cam Camouflage Uniform).

== See also ==
- Military police
- Military police vehicles
