= Royal Australian Corps of Military Police =

Administrative corps of the Australian Army

- RACMP Identification Arm Patch

- Badge
- Abbreviation: RACMP
- Motto: For the troops, with the troops

Agency overview
- Formed: 3 April 1916
- Preceding agency: Australian Army Provost Corps

Jurisdictional structure
- Operations jurisdiction: Australia
- Legal jurisdiction: Australian Army
- General nature: Military provost

Operational structure
- Agency executive: Queen Camilla, Colonel-in-Chief

Website
- www.army.gov.au/our-people/organisation-structure/army-corps/royal-australian-corps-military-police

The Royal Australian Corps of Military Police (RACMP) is a corps within the Australian Army. Previously known as the Australian Army Provost Corps, it was formed on 3 April 1916 as the ANZAC Provost Corps. It is responsible for battlefield traffic control, security duties, prisoner of war handling, the investigation of service offences, maintaining discipline and the running of military prisons. Its name was changed in 1918 and it was disbanded in 1920. The corps was reformed during World War II and was granted the "Royal" prefix in 1948, adopting its current name on 4 September 1974. The then Duchess of Cornwall became the first Colonel-in-Chief of the Royal Australian Corps of Military Police in November 2012. The Royal Australian Corps of Military Police have played a role in World War I, World War II and aided in conflicts since the finish of the second world war, including Afghanistan and the Timor Leste Crisis. The Corps have embellishments such as the Governor General’s banner which they received in 2001. As well as specific uniform requirements up to and including their standout scarlet beret. The Military Police has a range of training pathways which leads to the many different specialised roles the members hold.

== Role ==
The role of the Royal Australian Corps of Military Police is to aid the Australian Defence Force (ADF) in the restoration of peace and law and order. The Corps have also played roles in peace keeping since World War II in which they have occasionally worked with the Australian Federal Police. Specific peace keeping operations involve; manoeuvre support, custody of POWs, civil affairs, security, mobility support and law enforcement. They have additionally been known to be involved with military detention within Australia as they were in charge of Military Detention Facilities in the Northern Territory prior to 1943. The Corps have held positions in traffic control and monitoring as well as a back-up communication team for the front line.

The Corps are trained in specific ways to help maintain law and order. Such skills include in power of arrest and detention, judicial expertise and liaising experience. As well as the investigation roles of the Royal Australian Military Police and their detention training. The range of skills that the Corps hold allow them to operate over a large spectrum of Australian Defence Force Units, including high-threat situations.

Personnel of the Royal Australian Corps of Military Police are posted in several units: those being the 1st Military Police Battalion, the Domestic Policing Unit (disbanded), the Joint Military Police Unit (JMPU), the Australian Defence Force Investigative Service (a section of JMPU) , the Defence Police Training Centre, Defence Force Corrective Establishment and the Office of the Provost Marshal Army.

== History ==
The Corps group was formed in April 1916 and was originally named the ANZAC Provost Corps. It then was renamed the Australian Army Provost Corps in January 1918 which was subsequently disbanded at the end of World War I. It was reformed during the World War II and on 4 September 1974 its name was changed to its currently held name the Royal Australian Corps of Military Police. The corps are also known as the (Australian) Military Police in literature and army writings. At the time of the name change, the RACMP motto was changed as well. The Australian Army Provost Corps motto was "First in Last Out" and with the name change the motto of the Australian Corps of Military Police which is still currently held is "For the Troops, With the Troops".

=== World War I ===
The Corps was formed during World War I in order to maintain order and discipline within the large number of troops within Egypt after the end of the Gallipoli campaign. Corps personnel were spread throughout the Middle East and Europe during the war, taking part in actions at Gallipoli, on the Western Front and in the Sinai and Palestine in order to help keep troops under control and to aid with detention. The Australian Military Police's role to keep Australian troops under control caused a lot of tension between the two groups and this continued through into the Second World War.

=== World War II ===
When the corps was reinstated in 1939 at the start of World War II, there were members of this unit positioned within all Australian Army deployments this was allowed by their 4600 members. The Australian Army Provost Corps were involved in the removal and arrest of Japanese families from Australian society at the start of World War II and took them to camps such as the ones at Adelaide River. The Australian Military Police were also recorded as directing traffic in Larrisa, Greece after the battalion there was directed to move South causing traffic issues and as the roads were under attack by Stukas. One of the Australian Military Police captains was awarded a Military Cross for actions while under attack from Stuka dive bombers, grounding two of these aircraft. The Corps in the Middle East and Greece also helped Australian soldiers in directing them to their attack lines as well as handling and guarding prisoners of war. During the war training camps for the Military Police were set up in order to increase the skill of the newly reinstated Corps.

=== Post World Wars ===
The Corps served Korea in the 1950s and assisted in the Malayan Emergency in 1955 and then in Vietnam from 1965. Up until 1990 women were not employed by the Army in combat-based roles and at the start of 1990 one of the beginning positions opened up to women was the military police. In the early 2000s, the Australian Military Police were also deployed to the situations occurring in both Iraq and Afghanistan.

=== Recent history ===
The Royal Australian Corps of Military Police also provided aid in 2006 East Timorese crisis when the country experienced civil upset. This is one of the deployments in which the Australian Federal Police also attended and worked with the Military Police. In this situation they worked under the control of the United Nations and the agreement of the Regional Assistance Mission to Solomon Islands.

In November 2012, the Royal Australian Corps of Military Police were appointed a Colonel-in-Chief, the Duchess of Cornwall. This inauguration is a representation of the relationship and traditional ties between the Corps and the Royal Family. The Duchess of Cornwall officially accepted this title on 9 November 2012 at the Victoria Barracks in Sydney.

== Corps embellishments ==
=== Banners ===
The Royal Australian Corps of Military Police were provided with the Governor General’s banner on April 7, 2001 at the Lamia Barracks in Holsworthy. This was the first time the Corps had been presented with a banner and it is now house at the Defence Force School of Policing.

=== Badge ===
The Royal Australian Corps of Military Police badge does not include their motto, this occurs only one other Australian Army corps. The current badge consists of: a laurel wreath, the Crown of St Edward and crossed Roman broadswords. The swords are surrounded by the wreath and the Crown of St Edward sits in the foreground at the top of the wreath. The Corps before 1949 were recognised only by their red MP (Military Police) armband which they still wear today as they only received an official badge in 1949. The badge is worn either on the Corps’ collar of their uniform or on their hat or beret.

=== Lanyard ===
All members of the Royal Australian Corps of Military Police wear the corps lanyard. The lanyard for this corps was authorised on 25 June 1995. It is coloured red and black rope intertwined; these colours are in line with RACMP official colours. The lanyard is not worn in the field, instead it is worn during ceremonial activities and in some other work environments. The lanyard is worn by all RACMP members excluding those of ranks senior regimental sergeant major’s and all those ranking colonel or above.

== Uniform ==
The Royal Australian Corps of Military Police have several different attires as they wear different clothing dependant on the occasion, the following encompasses their polyester general duty dress. One of the RACMP’s more distinguishing items of clothing is their scarlet beret, it has been the official headdress for the authorised members of the Corps since March 1975. The beret has been considered a standout item from those such as their Colonel-in-Chief, The Duchess of Cornwall, who made the following comment while on her visit to Australia in 2012. "I am delighted to see that you are all wearing your rather dashing scarlet berets and wondered if the Colonel-in-Chief might possibly get to wear one, too?". The Military Police must wear a white belt with equipment attached in addition to their scarlet MP identification badges. The holster pistol, hand cuff pouch and tactical baton holders and items are only worn when the Corps have been ordered to do so. Although if a RACMP is currently posted within the Australian Defence Force Investigative Service (ADFIS) unit they will wear the ADFIS identification patch. Another significant item of this uniform are the scarlet and black lanyard. The uniform then includes a capped sleeved khaki shirt, khaki slacks and socks and black leather boots. The main differences between the polyester general duties dress and the Patrol Order Services dress are that the khaki necktie, a long sleeve khaki shirt and either a service dress; skirt, slacks or trousers are required for patrol order.

== Specialisation ==
The Royal Australian Corps of Military Police are involved in many smaller or separate units throughout the defence force. The Military Police are placed and involved in the Domestic Policing Unit which is unit that works on Army bases to help commanders keep civilian law intact while also being in charge of Garrison Policing and small investigations involving illegal activity. Another area that the Corps specialise into is the Australian Defence Force Investigator role. These Corps are trained at the Defence Force School of Policing and are taught how to deal with very complicated and important investigations, they are also taught forensics. Once the Military police reach a satisfactory level they are placed into ADFIS. This unit was previously the Special Investigations Branch, which was formed in 1940 and whose members had similar duties to the Investigators of the Military Police and fulfilled a role similar to ADFIS. The members of the Royal Australian Corps of Military Police can also be trained to specialise in dog handling. These personnel are required to train and handle dogs used for a wide range of Military Police roles such as tracking, crowd control and apprehension of criminals. Another Military Police specialist role is that of personal protection, this protection from the Corps is provided to those of high importance. Corps Specialists undergo close protection for are those at high risk of terrorist, military or criminal attack due to their high stature whether it be due to influence, power or that they are vulnerable. Each of these Military Police specialisations come with their own specifically catered training schemes.

== Training ==
Personnel received little training within the corps' early years of service. The unit had been put together out of necessity during the first world war and therefore members were not provided with the high amount of training they’re now receiving over 100 years since their original formation. The Corps were highly disliked by Australian troops in both the First and Second World Wars. In an effort to make the Australian Provost Corps a more respectable unit the Provost Marshal of October 1939 decided to create a syllabus for training the military police. Simultaneously, the Corps was expanding at a rapid rate meaning members had to be trained quickly and therefore the training syllabus only had a minor effect in improving the ability of the unit. This resulted in a training camp being created in 1941 in Palestine which increased the corps' professionalism and ability to conduct their orders. Personnel who enter the Military Police through the general Army are sent to Kapooka to complete their recruit course. The recruits then undergo their initial training at the Defence Force School of Policing and dependant on the specialisation of their role will move throughout different training regimes.

== Gallery ==
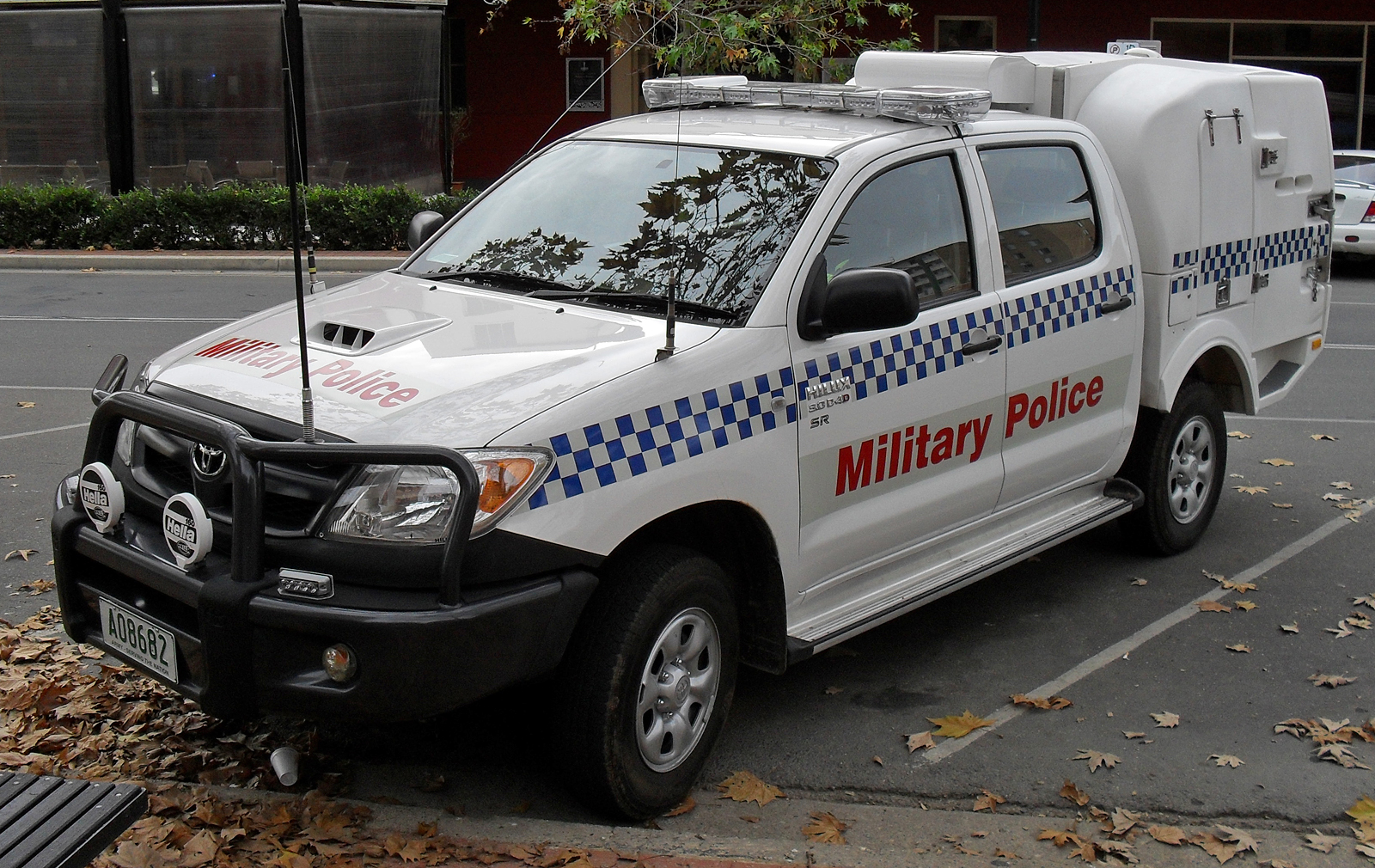
RACMP vehicle

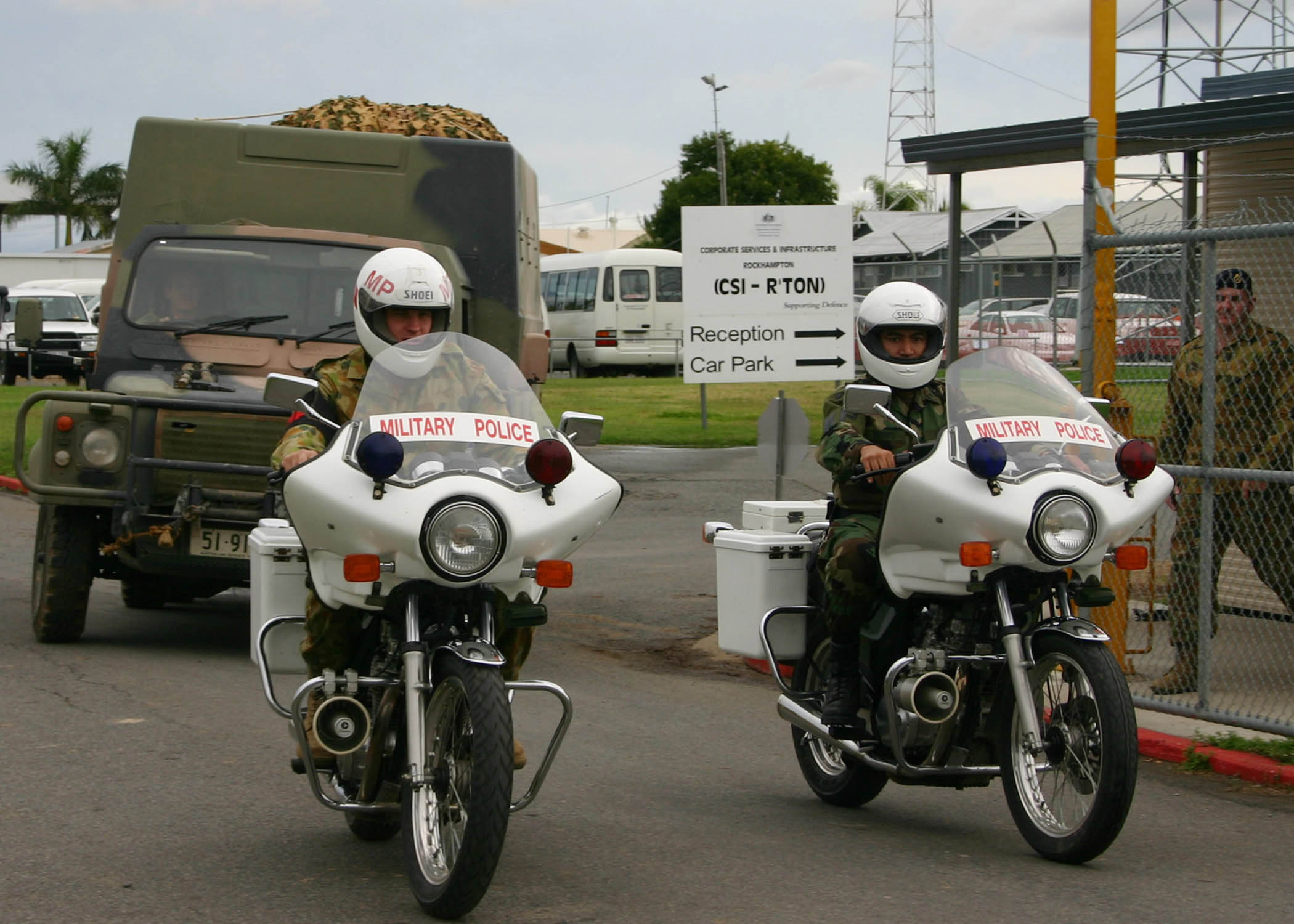
RACMP providing escort

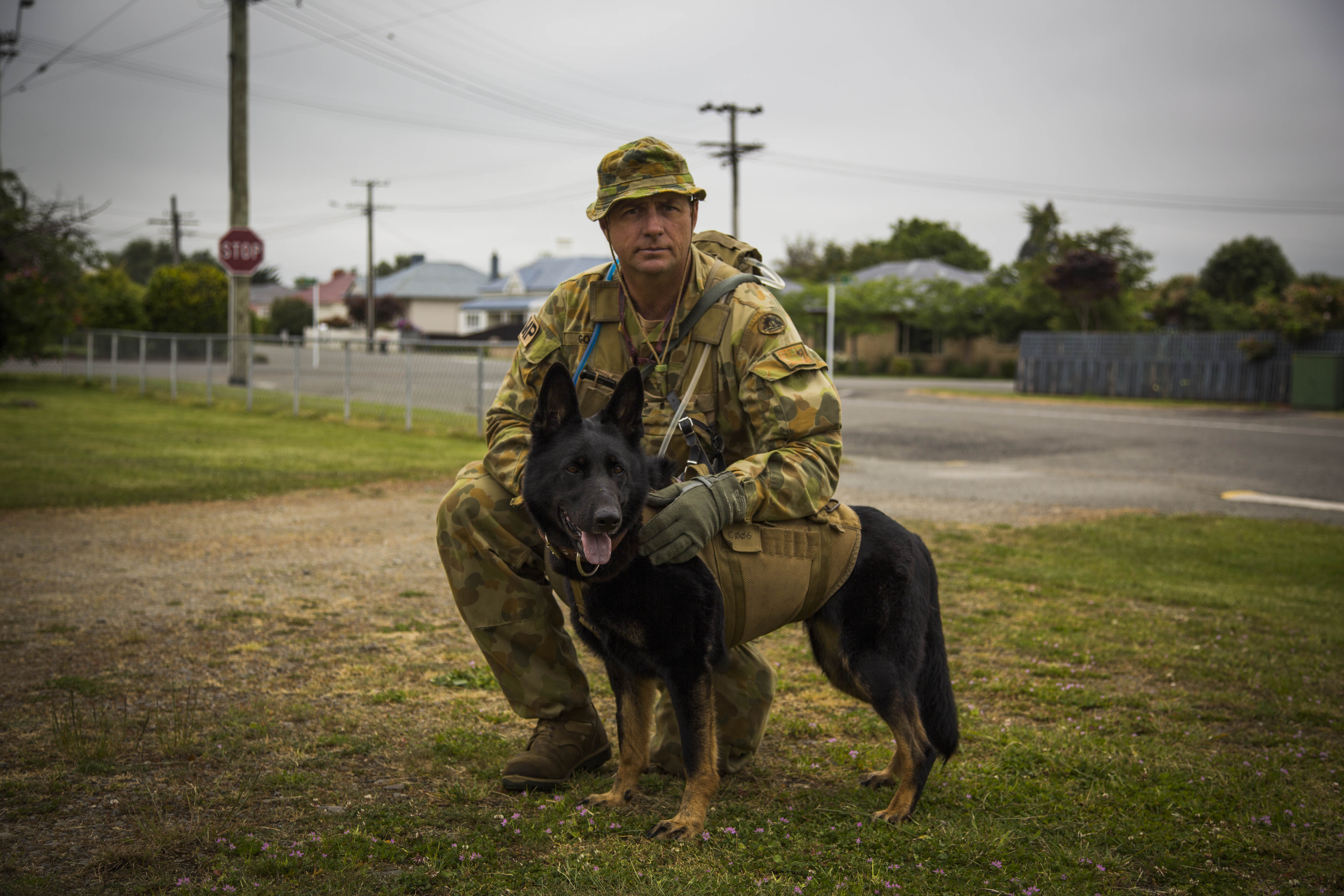
A dog handler from the 1st Military Police Battalion

== See also ==
- Law enforcement in Australia
- Joint Military Police Unit
- Australian Defence Force Investigative Service
- Royal Military Police
- Corps of Royal New Zealand Military Police

Preceded by Royal Australian Electrical and Mechanical Engineers	Australian Army Order of Precedence	Succeeded by Royal Australian Army Pay Corps
