= No. 1 Security Forces Squadron RAAF =

1 Security Forces Squadron
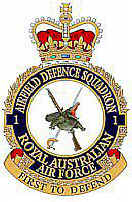
- Active: 1 October 1992 – present
- Branch: RAAF
- Role: Air Force Infantry
- Part of: Combat Support Group
- Garrison/HQ: RAAF Base Williamtown
- Motto: "First to Defend"

No. 1 Security Forces Squadron (1SECFOR) is a Royal Australian Air Force (RAAF) military unit whose primary role is to protect and secure airfields, buildings, equipment, and personnel.

== Crest ==
The squadron's crest comprises a crossed rifle and sword surmounted by a crocodile. The crocodile is symbolic in that it aggressively defends its territory against all intruders and can strike quickly to disable any aggressor. The symbolism of the crocodile aligns with the protective role of Airfield Defence Guards and the aggressive patrolling and decisive actions performed providing security to otherwise vulnerable air bases.

== History ==
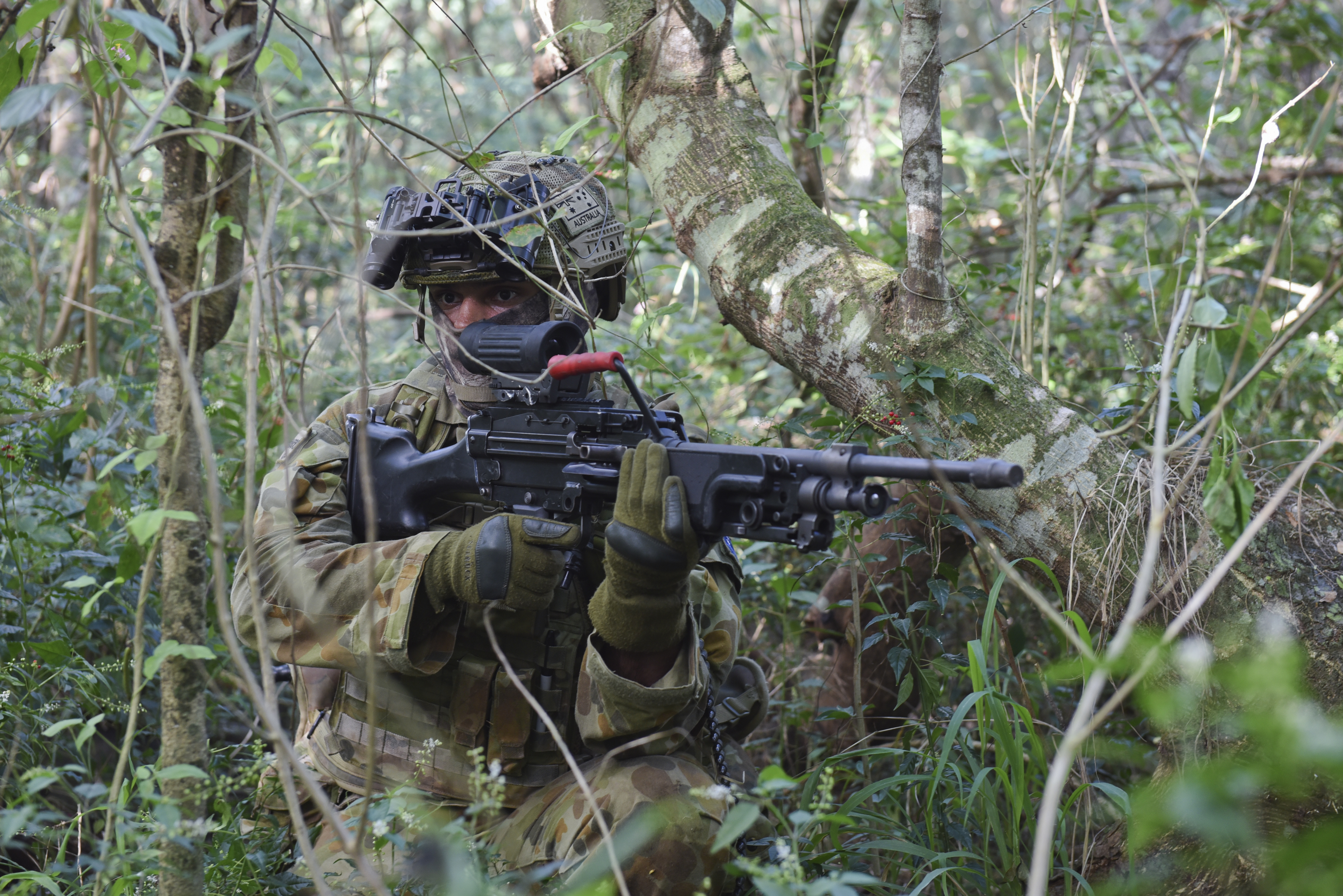
A gunner from No. 1 Security Forces Squadron during an exercise in 2017

Formed on 1 October 1942, as Security Guard Unit RAAF (SGU) at Livingstone Airfield, Northern Territory, Australia. All guards at operational bases, advanced operational bases, radio stations and non-operational units were assigned to this Unit from 5 October 1942. Their role was to provide personnel to defend airfields and their assets against Japanese attacks.

SGU was then relocated to Nightcliff on 13 June 1943 and saw operational service during World War 2 in support of units throughout the South Pacific theatre of war. Of particular note are the services rendered by the Special Task Force that served under command Z Force, with two members of the 1AFDS later being awarded MBEs. SGU was renamed No 1 Airfield Defence Squadron on 1 April 1945 but was disbanded on 19 November 1945 following the cessation of hostilities. The musterings that served in the Squadron were Airfield Defence Officers (ADO), Aerodrome Defence Instructors (ADI), and Guards. The SGU provided administration and standardised the training of security guards and a mobile body of guards that would be available that could defend the bases against Japanese attacks.

On 23 September 1945, the unit was moved to Winnellie, Northern Territory and was disbanded on 19 November 1945. 1AFDS Reformed at RAAF Base Mallala, South Australia in 1950, to provide training to National Service personnel in airfield defence duties. Renamed No. 1 Aerodrome Defence Squadron (1ADS) on 25 June 1951 and was disbanded in March 1953.

The unit was again reformed on 1 July 1992 at RAAF Base Tindal, Northern Territory. Initially formed to provide the training under the Ready Reserve Scheme, however, this was amended to the ground defence, protection and security of RAAF installations, assets, facilities and personnel on 30 June 1992.

On 1 January 1999, No. 1 Airfield Defence Squadron (1AFDS) was relocated to RAAF Base Edinburgh, South Australia. In 1999, 16 Reserve Airfield Defence Guards from 1AFDS were deployed to East Timor for Operation Warden/Stabilise under the command of No. 2 Airfield Defence Squadron.

In 2010, 1AFDS was moved to Amberley and expanded to full-time service members working with reserve flights.

On 4 July 2013, following a re-organisation of security forces within the RAAF, 1AFDS was re-roled as No. 1 Security Forces Squadron, with the HQ element based RAAF Williamtown. The ADGs were joined by the newly created Air Force Security (AFSEC) and Air Force Police (AFPOL) elements within New South Wales, the Australian Capital Territory and Victoria.

== Operations ==
- World War II
- East Timor
- Iraq War
- Afghanistan War
  - 2001–present

== Structure ==
- Headquarters
- Rifle Flights x 5
- Security Flights x 5

== See also ==
- No. 2 Security Forces Squadron RAAF
