= Criminal record =

Record of a person's criminal history

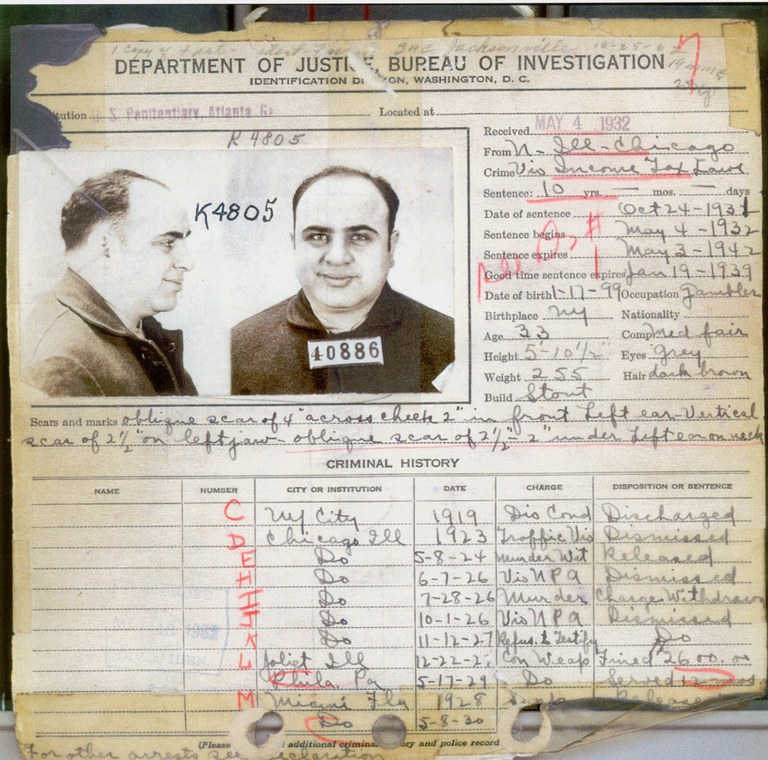
The criminal record for Al Capone from 1932

A criminal record (not to be confused with a police record or arrest record) is a record of a person's criminal convictions history. The information included in a criminal record, and the existence of a criminal record, varies between countries and even between jurisdictions within a country. In most cases it lists all non-expunged criminal offences and may also include traffic offences such as speeding and drunk driving. In most countries, a criminal record is limited to unexpunged and unexpired actual convictions (where the individual has pleaded guilty or been found guilty by a qualified court, resulting in the entry of a conviction), while in some it can also include arrests, charges dismissed, charges pending and charges of which the individual has been acquitted.

A criminal history may be relevant for international travel, and for the charging and sentencing of persons who commit additional criminal offenses. They are also used by potential employers, lenders, and others to assess a person's trustworthiness. Criminal records may also be stored on national databases or crime information centers, where they can be viewed internationally via Interpol.

== Australia ==
Individuals in Australia can obtain a national criminal history to check themselves, and certain organisations can apply for one on their behalf. A person may be required to undergo a criminal record check for a variety of reasons, including employment screening, volunteer work, preparing for a court appearance, visa applications, firearms licensing, or to satisfy a statutory requirement. Individuals can obtain a national criminal history through two ways:

1. Their local police service.
2. An Australian Criminal Intelligence Commission (ACIC) – accredited organisations such as employing institutions, or commercial background checking service providers. A list of ACIC accredited agencies is available from their website. Some of the commercial providers allow online application, real time responses, and online verification.

The Working With Children Check, which is used to screen workers and volunteers in child-related work, is a specific check for those whose criminal records are deemed to pose a high risk to children.

== Austria ==
In Austria, criminal records and "Strafregisterbescheinigungen" (criminal record certificate) are maintained by the Register Division ("Strafregisteramt") of the Federal Police Directorate of Vienna ("Bundespolizeidirektion Wien"). In order to access a criminal record in Austria, a person must complete a form with relevant identification and pay a fee (the fee is dependent on the specific criminal record certificate requested and whether or not the application is done online). Requests for a criminal record certificate can be taken to police stations and will be processed and provided to the applicant immediately, when requested at most main state police departments. If requested at an office that does not have direct access to the register of criminal records then this may take longer and the certificate will be sent to the applicant by official government post (RSa-Brief). The application must be made in person by the applicant. A regular criminal record can also be applied for, and received digitally signed, online using the ID Austria electronic identification service.

In Austria, a request for a criminal record certificate can come in two forms – restricted and unrestricted disclosure. An application at the request of a future employer will be issued a restricted disclosure, which only contains unexpunged convictions and may not include less serious convictions. An unrestricted disclosure certificate is exclusively for specific state agencies (for example, firearms licensing bodies, military and law enforcement agencies), and, even then, is only issued in specific circumstances. This type of criminal record certificate contains details of all convictions. All criminal offences are recorded on the Criminal Register. Convictions are removed from the Criminal Register upon expiry of the penalty, which generally occurs when the penalty ends, but can extend to up fifteen years after the penalty has been completed. The only exception is life sentences which are not removed from the Criminal Register. Austria maintains a sex offender registry; however, this is mainly for law enforcement and intelligence purposes.

There are special criminal records that can be applied for at the request of an employer for work in the following three areas:

- child and youth welfare
- care and support of vulnerable individuals
- critical infrastructure, arms manufacture and trade, and security industry

The former two show any record of convictions against the sexual integrity and/or self-determination and/or court bans that have been entered into the criminal record. The latter includes any convictions for terrorist offences, genocide, crimes against humanity and more. For these special criminal records the expungement of convictions is delayed.

== Belgium ==
In Belgium, there is a national central criminal record system which records, keeps and modifies data related to penal decisions. The criminal record system is maintained by the Federal Public Service Justice. The criminal records held within the central system contain the following data: criminal record number; name, surname and given name; date and place of birth; gender; residence; profession; nationality; court; number of judges; degree of jurisdiction; reference, number and date of judgement; date of transmission to central criminal record; sentence pronounced, place and date of the criminal acts. The central system contains records of

a) Penal convictions for all types of offence;
b) Penal convictions of guilt subjecting the convicted person to a probationary period;
c) Decisions of revocation of the previous category;
d) Penal decisions concerning confinement of mentally ill offenders;
e) Deprivation of parental rights, and reintegration, as well as several measures regarding delinquent minors;
f) Several decisions which quash prior judgements;
g) Several decisions of retraction;
h) Decisions that rectify or interpret the law on which the conviction has been decided;
i) Decisions of rehabilitation;
j) Decisions of pardon;
k) Decisions of release on parole;
l) Decisions from foreign jurisdictions regarding Belgian citizens;
m) Sentences accompanying a main sentence, subsidiary sentences, 'security measures', and deferred sentences

There is no record of dismissed cases or verdicts of not guilty. To access their own criminal record, a person can seek it from their local police authority or send a written request to the Federal Public Service Justice. In terms of public access to criminal records, the following persons and judicial and administrative bodies may be able to gain access to records through the Federal Public Service Justice.

- Corporations: corporations, association, etc.
- Individuals when the document should be used abroad
- Foreigners for the period of their stay in Belgium
- Specific categories (e.g. diplomats)

Two kinds of erasure exist in the Belgian system: The real erasure is the disappearance of the conviction, and applies only to police sentences (small fines and 8 days of imprisonment or less). For all other sentences, a system of "no mention" applies, whereby the conviction remains recorded in the central system but is no longer available for access by several categories of people.

== Bulgaria ==
Disclosure of criminal records in Bulgaria is governed by Regulation No 8/26.02.2008 for the Functions and Organisation of the Activity of the Criminal Records Offices. The criminal record system for citizens of Bulgaria are kept in the Criminal Records Office located at every Regional Court in Bulgaria, and the Central Office of Criminal Records at the Ministry of Justice. There are two types of criminal records disclosed in Bulgaria; Conviction Status Certificate, and the Verification of Conviction Status. The Conviction Status Certificate contains personal information about the concerned individual (full name, personal identification number, date and place of birth, nationality, names of parents), details of all the convictions and the purpose of the Certificate. This Certificate is valid for 6 months from the date it was issued, and can only be applied for by the concerned individual, relative of individual, legal heir of the concerned individual, or a power of attorney. The Verification of Conviction Status contains personal information about the concerned individual (full name, personal identification number, date and place of birth, nationality, names of parents), details of all convictions, including whether rehabilitation was required, and information about all imposed administrative sanctions. There is no term of validity for this status; however, it can only be issued for an official purpose by governmental or law enforcement authorities. These records can be accessed through application to the Central Office of Criminal Records. The cost is approximately €2.60.

The Bulgarian Penal Code allows the removal of conviction data for individuals, known as the 'rehabilitation of individuals'. This can be awarded by a court of law given that the individual has demonstrated good conduct, and has compensated any damages. A second type of rehabilitation is known as rehabilitation de jure which enacts new legislation. This can occur if the individually has been sentenced conditionally, the individual has been sentenced to up to three years' imprisonment and has not committed any other crimes punishable by imprisonment, the individual was sentenced to a fine, public reprimand or deprivation of civil rights, and they have not committed another crime the year following. Additionally, judgments are removed from a criminal record after the sentence has been served and the following time has elapsed:

- For life imprisonment without substitution or life imprisonment: 20 years
- For imprisonment of over 10 years: 15 years
- Imprisonment between 3 and 10 years: 10 years
- Imprisonment between of less than 3 years: 5 years
- All remaining cases: 2 years

== Canada ==
In Canada, criminal records are stored in Criminal Records Information Management Services, a centralized database operated by the Royal Canadian Mounted Police under the Canadian Police Information Centre (CPIC) since 1972. The database includes all convictions for which a pardon has not been granted, all charges regardless of disposition, outstanding warrants and charges, all judicial orders and other information that might be of interest to police investigations.

=== Screening ===
There are two types of criminal record checks: standard and vulnerable sector. Vulnerable sector is defined under the Criminal Records Act as minor (less than 18 years of age) and

persons who, because of their age, a disability or other circumstances, whether temporary or permanent,(a) are in a position of dependence on others; or(b) are otherwise at a greater risk than the general population of being harmed by persons in a position of authority or trust relative to them

There are 4 levels of standard criminal record checks—levels 1 to 4. Level 1 is the most basic check and level 4 being the most extensive. Criminal record checks can only be done with the consent of the individual. Due to the sensitive nature of CPIC, only police agencies are authorized to conduct a criminal record check, with the exception of BC Ministry of Justice.

- Level 1: Records of criminal convictions for which a pardon has not been granted (CPIC Level 1 Query)
- Level 2: Level 1 + outstanding charges that the police force is aware of (CPIC Level 1 Query + Persons Query)
- Level 3: Level 2 + records of discharges which have not been removed (all charges regardless of disposition) (CPIC Level 2 Query + Persons Query)
- Level 4: Level 3 + check on local police databases, court and law enforcement agency databases (also known as "Police Record Check"). The vulnerable sector screening includes a level 4 check plus any sexual offences and convictions for which a pardon was granted.

In the event that the name and date of birth of the applicant matches any sexual offence record in the system, he/she is required to submit fingerprints to the RCMP for a physical confirmation. Criminal record check is an integral part of the process for obtaining security clearances regardless of level of access. Some provinces may require high-risk professions to be screened to ensure public safety. For example, the BC Ministry of Justice requires all healthcare professionals, practicum students in healthcare, childcare facilities staff and volunteers, school and hospital staff regardless of position to undergo a CRC via the Criminal Records Review Program.

=== Pardon ===
Criminal offences can be pardoned either by the Governor General of Canada, Parole Board of Canada or through an Order in Council by the federal government, as determined by the crime involved under the Criminal Records Act. Pardon has been renamed as record suspension under Bill C-10, otherwise known as the omnibus crime bill or by its formal name Safe Streets and Communities Act, introduced by the Conservative government in 2011. The change officially came into force on 13 March 2012. In 2017, two provincial superior courts struck down the retroactive nature of these changes as unconstitutional. As a result, pardons are currently being granted to residents of BC and Ontario who were convicted prior to 2012.

== Chile ==
In Chile, citizens can request their own criminal records at the Civil Registrations office or the Registro Civil. According to the Article 19 N°16 of the Constitution of Chile, an employer cannot discriminate based on anything else but personal capabilities to perform at the job offered. One can eliminate one's criminal records by a voluntary checkup, providing your signature two years for first offenses, or five years for more. A person must be complaint of the requisites provided by the law No. 409.

== Croatia ==
The Criminal Code of Croatia: The Official Gazette of the Republic of Croatia "Narodne novine" entered into force on 1 January 1998.

Under Article 86, criminal record data may be given only to courts and state attorney's offices when a criminal case is brought against the person. Governmental bodies can access this data upon a reasonable request and must be related to specific tasks in public service to be entrusted to the person for whom such information is requested. The police can also gain access with the intention of discovering the perpetrator of a criminal act. Other members of the general public do not have the right to demand that citizens submit records concerning their convictions. A citizen retains the right to access data from their own criminal record, only under the condition that the purpose is to exercise his rights in another state.

Certificates of criminal records are issued from the Department for Criminal Records. To be expunged of any conviction from one's criminal record, Article 19 of the Law on Legal Consequences of Conviction, Rehabilitation and Criminal Records (Official Gazette 143/12) needs to be referred to.

== Cyprus ==
In Cyprus, criminal records are held by the Criminal Investigation Office of Cyprus Police which forms part of the Republic of Cyprus Minister of Justice and Public Order. A Clear Criminal Record Certificate or existing Criminal Record can be requested by individuals through application to the Criminal Investigation Office. Applications can be made in person at the Central Police Station in Nicosia. Criminal records in Cyprus are maintained for life.

Cyprus introduced legislation in 2014 allowing for the creation of a sex offenders register. The legislation also provides for inclusion of a greater European Union sex offender registry. There are different procedures and protocols for the Turkish Republic of Northern Cyprus.

== Czech Republic ==
The Czech Republic took part in the Network of Judicial Registers pilot project, with 10 other countries, exchanging information on criminal records electronically. The criminal record system of the Czech Republic is a computerized system. Criminal record information is maintained at the Criminal Records Office in Prague—which is state-funded and can be found at the offices of the Ministry of Justice.

Individuals can request An Excerpt from the Penal Register for personal access only. Applications can be made from Czech Republic embassies, and also by prospective employers for people who have been a resident or citizen of the Czech Republic. Data on corporate criminal records are accessible by the general public. Length of time that individuals are on the criminal record system. Criminal convictions remain on record for an indefinite period. Under certain conditions, the Court will expunge convictions after 15 years in an exceptional sentence, 10 years if there conviction of the sentence does not exceed 5 years, 5 years if the sentence of imprisonment does not exceed one year.

== Denmark ==
The Danish criminal record certificate is titled "Privat Straffeattest" and is the responsibility of the National Police Authority (the Rigspolitiet). The Danish Data Protection Agency governs the legislation in relation to criminal records and provides certain restrictions. Criminal convictions on the certificate include all violations of the Denmark Criminal Code. There are varying time frames for which convictions remain on an individual's criminal record. For example, fines remain on the record for 2 years from the date of payment, unconditional convictions for 5 years from date of release from prison, and suspended sentences for 3 years from the conviction date. Any older convictions will be struck from the record.

In order to obtain a criminal record check in Denmark an individual or third party (with written consent) can apply in person at a local police station or by way of email to the National Police Authority. Available languages for the certificate include English, German, Danish, French and Spanish where there are no convictions. When there are convictions, the only available language for the certificate is Danish. The certificate is issue free of charge and the turnaround ranges from immediate access to 2 days. Denmark does not allow the transfer of criminal records to foreign authorities or to the Europol database for storage.

In Denmark, child sex abuse information is contained in two registers, the National Patient Register and the Criminal Register. The National Patient Register contains all hospital contacts including inpatient, outpatient and emergency department contacts. The Danish National Criminal Register of child sex abuse contains data relating to cases reported to the Danish police. Any sexual relationship with an individual below the age of 15 is prohibited by law as the Danish age of sexual consent is 15. Cases involving child sexual abuse are classified into three different categories according to the type of the offence involved. These groups include incest, sexual offences (physical or attempted physical sexual assault) and indecent exposure.

== Estonia ==
The database that holds data about the criminal records of Estonian individuals is known as The Punishment Register, available for access through the Internet. It is owned and maintained by the Estonian Centre of Registers and Information Systems. Those records that are valid are made completely public. Some misdemeanour cases with the main punishment being less than 200 Euros, and cases involving minors are not published by The Punishment Register.

Since the beginning of 2012, the data providing for the criminal records of Estonian citizens is available online. Any individual with a criminal record can access the electronic version of the database to receive this information for free. In order to view information pertaining to a non-related individual, then a fixed fee must be paid to the Ministry of Justice of the Republic. The individual's name and identification in number is also required to view their criminal record. However, there still remain some restrictions on access to this register, including protecting access to information on the criminal records of minors.

Registering of sex offenders

Estonia do not have a public register for sex offenders, as the Punishment Register which is available for public viewing is viewed to be sufficient by The Minister of Justice. The Minister, Hanno Pevkur, was quoted as saying:

Every person has the right to request data on others from the Punishment Register, which has a separate search option for accessing information concerning crimes committed against minors...[anyone] can check the registry to see if [a] person's history is clean or not.

Since 2009, the police in Estonia have the power to check up on sex offenders who have completed their punishment.

== European Union ==
The European Criminal Records Information System (ECRIS) is a computerised system that allows EU countries to access and exchange information regarding EU citizens' criminal convictions in an efficient way. It was implemented in April 2012.

The ECRIS was brought about in order to simplify the exchange of information relating to the criminal records of European citizens. Intended to counterbalance the relatively new ease with which individuals can move between States, it is a mechanism of ensuring that individuals are not able to escape their criminal records by merely travelling across a border. The underlying rationale is that technological advancements in transport services which have given individuals the ability to easily move between European States should not amount to an ability to expunge their own criminal records.

This is particularly important given that most domestic courts in European countries place significant weight on offenders' past convictions during criminal sentencing (for example, under s 151(1) of the Powers of Criminal Courts (Sentencing) Act 2000 (UK)).

The EU State to which an offender is a citizen is the central repository of all criminal information relating to that offender. Accordingly, the ECRIS is not a general IT architecture that centralises all criminal information relating to all offenders. Rather, it acts as a platform that connects the central database of each State.

Developments allowing non-EU countries to utilise and contribute to the ECRIS are under current consideration.

On 24 January 2019, MEP's agreed to close a criminal records loophole, so that going forwards national authorities will be able to quickly establish whether another EU member state holds criminal records on a non-EU citizen.

In January 2020 it was revealed by The Guardian newspaper that the UK government had failed to inform other EU member states of 75,000 convictions of foreign criminals, it then concealed the scandal to avoid damaging Britain's reputation. "There is a nervousness from Home Office around sending the historical notifications out dating back to 2012 due to the reputational impact this could have." from the minutes of the ACRO criminal records meeting, May 2019. This disclosure followed deliberate abuse of the Schengen Information System, and GCHQ hacking into the Belgian telecoms provider Proximus.

== Finland ==
The name of the certificate of criminal record in Finland is titled: "Extract from the Criminal Record and Security Clearances". In Finland there is a variety of legislation governing the use and access to criminal records, some of which include The Penal Code of Finland 1889, The Criminal Records Act 1993, Act on Background Checks 2002, and the Personal Data Act 1999 chapter 6.

Finnish criminal record checks can come in different forms by way of different types of certificates. An Extract from the Criminal Record can be applied for only by individuals. Commonly issued for those whom have regular contact with children, it contains information that is relevant to the specific type of employment. Another type of certificate which is issued for visa, work or permit applications is the Criminal Record Extract for a Visa Application. The final type of certificate is the Security Clearance Check whereby companies within the UK who have a branch office in Finland can apply for security clearance checks on prospective employees. Three levels of check are provided (limited, basic and extended). Individuals cannot apply for this certificate and certain conditions must first be met by employers before applying to the Finnish Police, including obtaining the written consent from the individual before application.

The categories of criminal conviction contained within the Extract from the Criminal Record includes those involving offences against children, sexual offences, violent offences and narcotics offences. Any other convictions not relating to these categories will not be included on the certificate. The Criminal Record Extract for a Visa Applications contains information pertaining to custodial or suspended sentences, community service, fines, juvenile punishments, and overseas decisions against Finnish citizens or permanent residents.

The length of time convictions are kept on the record varies according to type of conviction. Convictions will be removed from a criminal record after 5 years (suspended sentences, fines, and community service supplementary to a suspended sentence), 10 years (custodial sentences less than 2 years, community service) or 20 years (custodial sentences between 2–5 years). If no recent convictions have been added to an individual's records, judgments will be removed upon death or when the individual reaches 90 years old.

There are multiple avenues in which an individual can obtain a criminal record check in Finland including applying online, by fax, post or email. An individual can also apply in person to the Legal Register Centre (Oikeusrekisterikeskus), which is the department responsible for the criminal record. The certificate, issued in English, French, German, Spanish and Swedish costs approximately €12 to €15. The certificate can be expected to be received within approximately seven working days, taking into account postage time.

As proscribed by Finnish legislation, extracts from criminal records can be transmitted to police authorities of the International Criminal Police Organization (ICPO), to police authorities, or to non-ICPO states on the grounds that it is to uphold public law, investigate and prevent criminal activity or to serve justice and social order.

== France ==
=== Criminal records ===
The criminal records of all French citizens are maintained through an electronic register maintained by the Ministry of Justice. The register is a collection of all sanctions and convictions from all penal courts since 1966 and remains the source for all aspects of criminal record disclosure in the state.

Generally speaking, the disclosure of a criminal record is only released to the individual who committed the offense and only when that individual has handed power of attorney to another or they are declared legally incompetent may another successfully apply to receive the disclosure. Prospective employers are not allowed access to disclosure at any time. Applications must be made through the Casier Judiciaire National (National Judicial Record, CJN) and are free of charge. Applications can be submitted online, via email, in person or by post of fax but are limited to the CJN. Criminal record certificates cannot be accessed through a French consulate or embassy at any time.

The three types of criminal bulletin:

- Bulletin 1 – legislatively restricted to issuance only to judicial authorities
- Bulletin 2 – restricted to French administrative authorities and various private organisations through the sanctions of the penal code
- Bulletin 3 – criminal record available only to the individual it concerns, available primarily in French but translation services can be accessed

Crimes that can be disclosed through the certificate of criminal record:

- Drug offences (possession, trafficking, attempt to sell)
- Violence against another individual (murder, attempted murder, assault)
- Sexual offences (sexual assault, sexual coercion, rape)
- Burglary and robbery
- Theft (including possession of stolen property, attempt to sell stolen goods)
- Fraud (including counts of forgery)
- Criminal damage (vandalism)
- Motoring offences and infractions

Removal of Offences from the Record Judgements against an individual are not published on a Bulletin 3 certificate once the rehabilitation period has passed (depending on the severity of the conviction either three years for misdemeanours or five years for felony crimes, after the sentence was completed). The records of the convictions will remain on the system but will not show on the request of a record. In the case of minors, these are removed from the Bulletin 3 once the individual concerned has reached 18 years and/or three years from the date the crime was committed.

=== Registering of sex offenders ===
France has a sex offenders registry but unlike systems such as the United States, does not allow the public to access information regarding the information of cases and individuals who have been convicted of sex crimes, nor does France require the community to be notified of the presence of a sex offender in their neighbourhood as is obligatory in some other countries.

France in particular takes into account the need for rehabilitation as well as the need for public safety. Justice Minister Dominique Perben stated "On the one hand, we must improve medical-psychiatric follow-up for these individuals and on the other hand, we must put in place a system that allows us to know where they are so we can help investigators do their jobs" in response to the soaring number of convictions for sexual offences in 2002.

== Germany ==
In Germany, a criminal record certificate (Führungszeugnis) is issued by the Federal Office of Justice (Germany) (Bundesamt für Justiz). Germany has a criminal record system holding all the information regarding past offences and sentences. The information is maintained by the Federal Central Criminal Register (Bundeszentralregister), which is in turn subordinate to the Federal Ministry of Justice. The registry is updated daily and holds information on approximately 6.3 million individuals.

Once a person turns 14, they are able to request their own criminal record. One's criminal record can be viewed by any member of the public at request, as long as they provide ID and purpose of the disclosure.

The information on the criminal record certificate (Führungszeugnis) includes prior offences, court citations and convictions. However, not all entries in the record system (Bundeszentralregister) are included on the certificate. Based on the severity of the committed crime and, more importantly, the sentence received, most entries are excluded from appearing on the certificate after a certain amount of time has passed (3, 5, 10 or 20 years). The time limit starts running on the day of the verdict. The only sentences exempt from this rule are life imprisonment, preventive detention and commitment in a mental hospital.

== Greece ==
In Greece, criminal records are written certificates where entries are created according to the legal provisions provided for in Articles 573–580 of the Greek Code of Criminal Procedure (CCrP). An Independent Department of Criminal Records exists within the Ministry of Justice and operates as the central authority, able to supervise the criminal record system in Greece. According to provisions contained within Article 573.2 of the CCrP, records will be kept for all nationals, regardless of country of birth and even including foreigners.

Each criminal record certificate has two components: the first regarding the individuation of the person and the second consisting of the content of the person's prior criminal acts. Every certificate must contain: information concerning the person's identity including the paternal surname and if they are married, and the final judgement/s passed down by a court. Specifically, Article 574.2 CCrP states that certificates must record:

- the complete listing of any irrevocable convictions issued by a court where a custodial penalty or a pecuniary sanction has been imposed;
- the complete list of any decisions sentencing a minor to confinement in an institution or educational measures;
- the complete list of convictions handed down by foreign courts, if the act committed constitutes a felony or misdemeanour according to Greek criminal law;
- the complete list of any decisions acquitting the accused due to the incapacity of the individual to stand trial because of lack of culpability or for reasons of practical repentance, given that the offence was punishable by a minimum penalty of three months' imprisonment;
- and any judicial decision suspending a custodial penalty.

These certificates of criminal records will no longer be in effect, according to Article 578, under the following conditions:

- when the person dies or is at least 80 years old;
- in cases in which a criminal offence was committed as a minor, when the minor is 17 years old;
- when the convicting order suspends the sentence and the suspension is omitted from the certificate five years after the ending of the suspension;
- if a minor has served a sentence in a correctional institution less than one year, the certificate will cease to be in effect after five years. If the sentence served exceeds one year, eight years after the completion of the sentence will the criminal act/s be struck from the record, unless a new conviction has been imposed in the meantime;
- if the judgement imposed a financial punishment or a sentence of imprisonment up to one month for an offence committed with intention, or a sentence of imprisonment for up to two months for an act committed by negligence, the criminal record ceases ten years after the sentence has been served.

In the aforementioned cases, the certificates are destroyed upon the validity of the reasons provided.

The full and detailed records of a one's criminal past can be available to a certain range of individuals and authorities, under the terms 'general use' and 'judicial use'. Under Article 575, general use dictates criminal records will and can be supplied for prospective members of the Bar, future notaries and chartered accountants as they are a prerequisite for registration.

== Hong Kong ==
In Hong Kong, criminal records are maintained by the Hong Kong Police Force. Unlike other countries listed on this article, Hong Kong authorities do not allow for access to criminal records by employers or school purposes. The Chief Executive of Hong Kong has the sole power to pardon offences committed in Hong Kong under section 12 of article 48 Basic Law of Hong Kong. "The Chief Executive of the Hong Kong Special Administrative Region shall exercise the following powers and functions... To pardon persons convicted of criminal offences or commute their penalties".

=== Spent records ===
Criminal records are not purged regardless of time or seriousness of the case. However, under the Rehabilitation of Offenders Ordinance (HK Laws. Chap 297), a criminal record is considered 'spent' if it was the first criminal offence, sentenced to less than 3 months in jail or fined less than $10,000 and a period of 3 years has elapsed since conviction and no new conviction is registered against the said person. Spent records are recorded as such with the exception to:

- Attempting to be licensed as a barrister, solicitor, accountant or insurance broker
- Applying to become a trustee or controller for Mandatory Provident Fund or a bank controller, executive or employee
- Disciplinary proceedings against any judicial officer, members of disciplined services, probation officer, employees of Hong Kong Monetary Authority, Mandatory Provident Fund Schemes Authority, Insurance Authority and Securities and Futures Commission (executive grade only)
- Disciplinary proceedings against government officials who are paid on any Directorate or Directorate (Judicial/Legal Group) Pay Scale and those above point 27 on the Master Pay Scale

All Hong Kong residents who plan to adopt children or travel/emigrate to another country can request for a Certificate of No Criminal Conviction—a document that is issued directly to the Consulate and/or government agencies and not to the requester. Spent records do appear on such certificates with annotations that such records are spent according to Hong Kong law.

== Hungary ==
A criminal database exists in Hungary which is allowed for under the 85th Act of 1999 on the criminal database and the official certificate of criminal record. There are 5 different databases, the database of offenders, the database of those under coercive measures, database of those under criminal procedures, the database of fingerprint, palm prints and photographs and the database of DNA profiles. Therefore, there is not only information recorded for those who have had a criminal sanction place against them, covered by the database of offenders, but also for those that are in pre-trial detention (database for those under coercive measures) and those who are suspected and accused of a crime (database for those under criminal procedures). The Central Office for Administrative and Electronic Public Services (COAEPS) of the Ministry of the Interior operates, managers and maintains the databases. Investigative authorities, public prosecutors offices and criminal courts all contribute to the databases. The amount of time a person's information is held on these databases varies. For people imprisoned for an intentional offence, data will be removed 15 years after their release. If the offence was committed recklessly, then the data will be removed 5 years after release The data is not publicly accessible, but a person can obtain the data held about themselves upon request.

== Indonesia ==
In Indonesia, criminal record certificate exist in the form of Surat Keterangan Catatan Kepolisian (SKCK) (English: Certificate of Police Records) Issued by Indonesian National Police. This certificate state the criminal records (or the lack of it) of an individual. An individual could request the issuance of their criminal record certificate on variety of reasons. For example, in Indonesia, employers often requires job applicants to submit their police record certificate to check whether said job applicant has any criminal history or not. The certificate cost Rp 30,000 for Indonesian citizens or Rp 60,000 for foreigners to be issued (it was previously Rp 10,000 for Indonesian citizens until 2016), and valid for 6 months. After expiration date, an individual must request for a new certificate if they still need the certificate . A certificate also could only be used for one specific purpose, as the purpose of the certificate's issuance is stated on the certificate, so individual must also request for a new one if they need a certificate for different purposes. A certificate will also be declared invalid if after the issuance, the individual in question is involved in any criminal activity.

In the past, the certificate was called Surat Keterangan Kelakuan Baik (SKKB) (English: Certificate of Good Conduct), and as the name suggest, this certificate certified the lack of criminal record of a person, thus, only a person without any criminal record could apply for an issue.

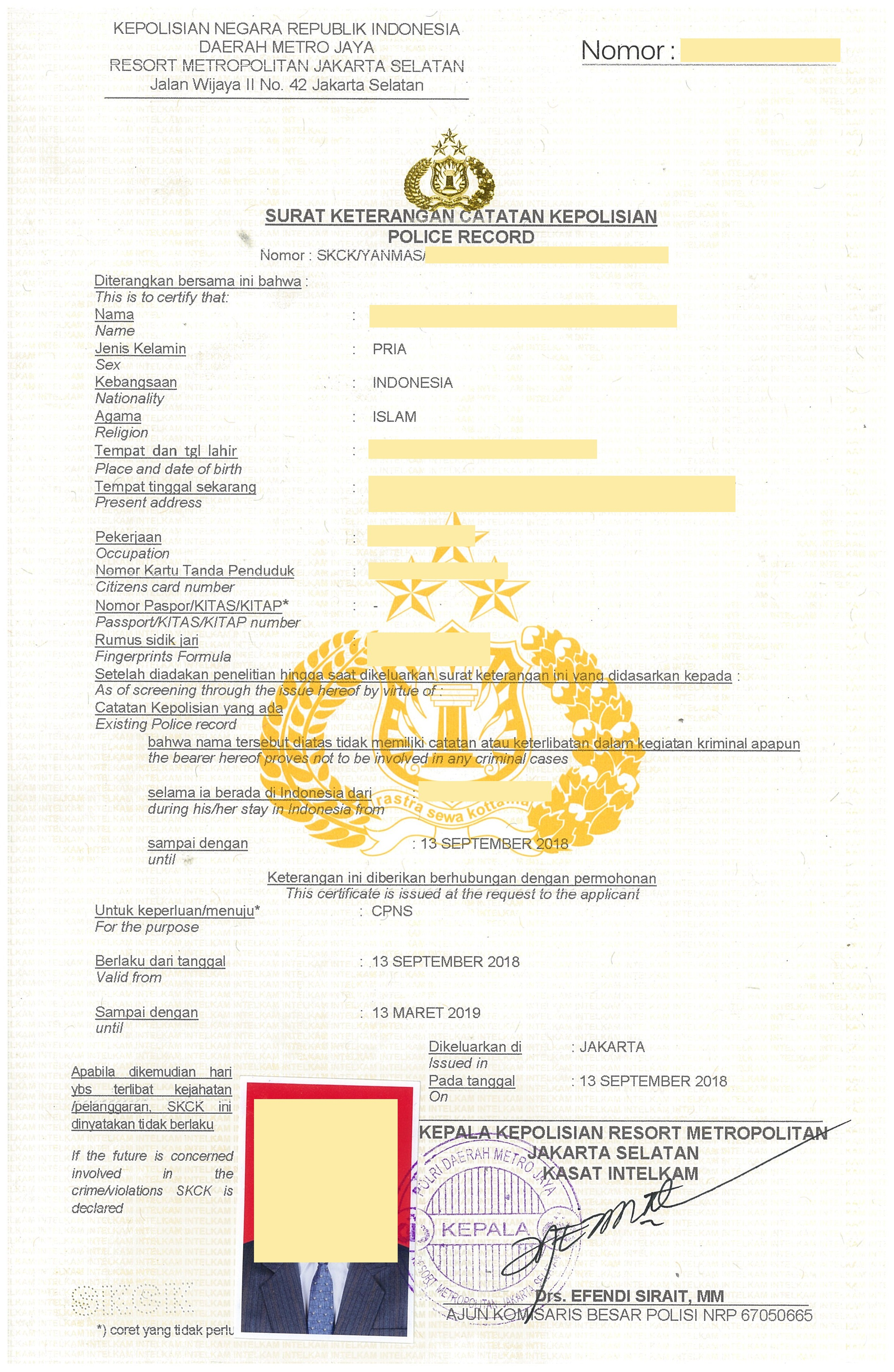
An Indonesian Certificate of Police Record issued in 2018 for the purpose of application to civil service position. This certificate states that the individual in question does not have any criminal record.

== Ireland ==
The criminal record system for Ireland exists in the form an information database system which is held by the Garda Criminal Records Office as part of the Garda Síochána (the national police force). The information is owned and maintained by the Gardaí as part of their main function in tackling crime and protecting civilians.

The data held by the Gardaí is not openly available to the public. However, section 4 of the Data Protection Act allows individuals to make a formal request in writing to the Garda Criminal Records Office to access personal data held about them. In making this formal request, individuals must provide sufficient information to establish their identity and ensure that the Gardaí is both able to locate their file and make certain that the personal data is being given to the right person. Sufficient information would include: full name, correct date of birth, any other names used, current address and previous addresses in Ireland, a copy of your passport, driving licence or birth certificate and a fee of €6.35.

Additionally, a third party may also be able to access your personal data on your behalf. However, this requires that the third party satisfy the Gardaí of their identity and that the individual provides written authorization to allow the third party to make this request.

In Ireland, criminal convictions remain on the criminal record system for life if the offence was committed after the individual turned 18, as there are currently no legislative provisions which provide for the expungement of criminal convictions. Ireland remains the only country in the EU and one of the only countries in the Council of Europe area to not have such legislation.

However, under Section 258 of the Children Act 2001, offences committed by those under eighteen years of age can be expunged from the record once certain conditions are met: where a person has been found guilty of an offence and:

- the offence was committed before they reached the age of eighteen years
- the offence is not one required to be tried by the Central Criminal Court (such as murder or rape)
- three years have elapsed since the conviction, and
- the person has not been dealt with for another offence in that three-year period

then that person will be treated as a person who has not committed or been charged with or prosecuted for or found guilty of or dealt with for that offence.

Registering of sex offenders

There is no official sex offender registry in Ireland. However, under the Sex Offenders Act 2001 which came into force in June 2001, an unofficial registry exists and is held centrally by the Gardaí. The location of sex offenders in Ireland is provided by a certificate issued by the court, stating that the convicted person is subject to the requirements of the Sex Offenders Act 2001 and is now obliged to provide certain information including their name and address to the Gardaí. Therefore, this certificate system is commonly referred to as the Sex Offenders Register, as it allows the details of all sex offenders subject to the requirements of the Sex Offenders Act 2001 to be held centrally by the Gardaí.

== Italy ==
Italy has a criminal record system held at the Criminal Records Bureau in Rome, governed by the department of Justice. It includes convicted criminals and those awaiting trials.

Anyone who is an Italian citizen or is a non-citizen but has resided in Italy for a significant period of time can apply to see the records at the criminal records bureau or at one of their offices located in Italy. One can also apply from the UK.

The Penal Certificate includes details of all criminal offences, court hearings and outcomes.

Civil Certificate – contains information regarding bankruptcy, mental competency, and information regarding expulsion from Italy.

General Certificate – Similar to Penal Certificate but also includes any information regarding expulsion from Italy.

Information that is included includes, full name, date of birth, place of birth, reason for request, type of request.

Cost is 3.10 Euros.

The certificates are only produced in Italian.

Can someone get their record expunged? Yes, Generally speaking, the record of an individual is expunged once the individual reaches 80 years of age or death. As the Italian system hold information regarding pending trails, once the guilty verdict is confirmed, it can take 3–10 years for their record to be expunged.

== Latvia ==
Information relating to the criminal records of Latvians is held at the Information Centre of the Ministry of the Interior. The aim of this centre – through the collection of information relating to crime – is to facilitate and investigate the most effective ways in which crime can be prevented to ensure public safety.

If a Latvian individual needs a certificate of their criminal history, they can electronically request this through www.latvija.lv. They may need this record of their criminal history to submit to employers, study overseas or enter into marriage. This record can only be obtained in person at the Ministry of Interior Information Centre or it can be received through registered mail. Therefore, information about an offender's criminal history is not accessible to all members of the public.

In accordance with Latvian law, most criminal records are terminated after several years. The amount of time for this to occur is dependent on the nature and scope of the legal sanction for that crime. These cancelled records are still held in Information Centre records, and are readily available if the individual involved authorises the disclosure of the entire record.

== Lithuania ==
On 13 September 2004, the National Register of Convictions of the Republic of Lithuania was established. The Departmental Register of Suspected, Accused and Convicted Persons is a central repository of criminal record data and related information in Lithuania. It is administered by the IT and Communications Department of the Lithuanian Ministry of the Interior which was appointed as the processing body in charge of ensuring the proper functioning and data management of the Register.

The register maintains records provided by the courts, pre-trial investigation institutions, national and local prosecution services, the prison department and the police criminal investigations centre. The department also collects and accumulates information received from foreign countries on the convictions of Lithuania in these countries.

With the consent of the individual, the Ministry of the Interior provides individuals and third parties with two types of disclosure: a Personal Certificate, containing information about unspent convictions only; and a Personal History Statement, comprising a full criminal record disclosure (both spent and unspent convictions).

In Lithuania, judgments will be removed from the Register immediately after the completion of the sentence, depending on the seriousness of the sentence. For high-risk recidivists (10 years from completion of sentence), very serious offences (8 years), serious offences (5 years), less serious offences (3 years), suspended sentences (immediately on completion of sentence). In cases of minors, convictions incurring custodial sentences remain unspent for half the period of time stated above.

== Luxembourg ==
The criminal record system in Luxembourg is maintained under the authority of the State Prosecutor General. It contains information about convictions from Luxembourg criminal courts and, under certain conditions, foreign courts. Criminal records have two parts, Bulletin no 1 which contains the complete statement of convictions of a person living or working in Luxembourg, and Bulletin no 2 which contains all convictions with the exception of suspended criminal sentences to prison for less than six months.

For a person with a clear criminal record, access to it is free and they may access it by email or post. For those with convictions, a fee applies and should present personally to the City Criminal Court for their extract.

== Malta ==
In Malta, criminal records are held by the Criminal Records Office which is maintained by the Malta Police. Individual criminal records can be obtained by requesting a Conduct Certificate from the Malta Police. Requests can be made in writing if outside the country or in person at the Malta Police Headquarters in Floriana. According to Conduct Certificate Ordinance, Chapter 77 of the Laws of Malta, a court order is required to issue a Conduct Certificate of someone other than the person which it refers to. Information contained in the Conduct certificate includes a declaration of whether the person is in good conduct or a declaration containing the convictions recorded against the person. In Malta there is provision under the Probation Act for conviction to be removed from the criminal record. Criminal records are kept for a maximum of 10 years.

Malta has recently introduced a sex offenders register. The legislation which enacted the introduction of the register is the Protection of Minors Registration Act 2012. Under the Act current and prospective employers can request information about employees contained in the register by application to the Attorney General. The application will then be heard in court. The Act states that it is a criminal offence to employ a registered person into an entity which deals with education, care, custody, welfare or upbringing of minors.

== Netherlands ==
Technically spoken all Dutch people do have an empty criminal record. A criminal record (Dutch: strafblad) is stored at Justitiële Informatiedienst in Almelo. By sending an e-mail with required data, scan of individual's passport or ID card, and paying €4.54 it is possible to have access to their own criminal record.

=== Creating and destroying a criminal record ===
A criminal record will be created after sentencing because of a violation or crime. The record will exist for 5 years in case of violations or 20 years for crimes. If the sentence is three years of imprisonment or longer, 30 years will be added at the time the criminal record will be stored. A traffic violation (according to the Mulder law) will not be stored in a criminal record, unless there will be a trial. Normally the traffic fine is given by a police officer, and the payment is generally done by banking. There will not be a trial, nor an addition in a criminal record. In case of sexual crimes (article 240b-250) the criminal record will be destroyed after 80 years. (article 4)

=== Consequences of a criminal record ===
For a person to be eligible to join certain professions, it may required that the person not have a criminal record or to pass an ethics review based upon the nature and seriousness of any past convictions. Professions that may not be open to those with criminal records or serious convictions include legal practice, teaching, and law enforcement. A foreign national with a criminal record may be prevented from getting a visa to enter the country.

=== Declaration about Behaviour ===
Close to the opposite of a criminal record is a Declaration about Behaviour, or as the English translation on the paper itself is called: 'Declaration of Conduct' (Dutch: Verklaring omtrent het Gedrag or VOG). This declaration is needed to apply for certain jobs, e.g. some government jobs, army positions, policing, or working as a security guard. The VOG will be given if the person:

- has no criminal record;
- has data in the criminal record which is irrelevant for the person who requested it. Not in all cases, because for becoming a police officer, for instance, the individual may not have any data in the record.

There is a criminal register for the Netherlands. The Netherlands took part in the Network of Judicial Registers pilot project, with 10 other countries, exchanging information on criminal records electronically. As of 2004, the criminal record system of the Netherlands takes the form of a computerized system. This was brought about in order to reduce the manual labour associated with the previous system.

=== Public access ===
Judicial Documentation Data can be requested firstly by the individual involved. Within four weeks, the individual can be told verbally of the information included in the Judicial Documentation. The law prohibits the provision of written information. If necessary for state security purposes, the information can be refused. Judicial data can be given to: Court officials for use in court proceedings, staff members at the office of Public Prosecutor, the Board of Procurators General, individuals and agencies not involved with criminal procedure if they serve a public function and if it serves the public interest. Conduct Certificate is a statement by the Minister of Justice, that there are no objections to the individual in question practicing a certain profession or occupying a certain position.

=== Length of time that individuals remain in the criminal record system ===
Judicial data on criminal offences are kept for 30 years after the criminal sentence has become irrevocable. Extensions can occur for non suspended prison sentences, mental hospital orders and youth detention. Data involving Minor offences are stored until five years after the irrevocable settlement of the case – extended to ten years if the individual was sentenced to prison or community service. Eighty years after the death of the individual, all data is removed.

=== Registration of sex offenders ===
A sex offenders register under the name of ViCLAS (Violent Crime Linkage Analysis System) allows for links to be made between national and international crimes and possible offenders. Data is not removed until 20 years after death of individual in question.

== New Zealand ==
In New Zealand, criminal records are administered by the Ministry of Justice. Under the Criminal Records (Clean Slate) Act 2004, records are automatically hidden from the public for less serious offences, if the individual has had no convictions for at least seven years and meets the other criteria of the act. An individual can request either their current (Clean Slate) or complete criminal record through the Ministry of Justice, or provide authorisation for a third party (e.g. employer) to view the current record. It is illegal, with some exceptions, for a third party to request a complete criminal record.

== Poland ==
The Polish Ministry for Justice administers the National Criminal Register (Polish: Krajowy Rejestr Karny), and it is regulated by the Act on the National Criminal Register 2000. The Act states that personal data is protected and can only be used for the public interest. Article 7(1) further states that data is only accessible to persons who fit certain criteria. Data can only be transferred to other entities, such as other law enforcement agencies, if their data protection meets the same standards, and if it is necessary for the public interest, or for the establishment of a legal claim (Article 47(4)).

As per the Act on the National Criminal Register 2000, the length of time an outcome remains on the National Criminal Register is as follows:

- Non-custodial sentences: 1 year from the date of decision
- Fines: 3 years from the date of decision
- Custodial sentences of up to 3 years: 5 years from the date of release (at the Court's discretion)
- Custodial sentences of more than 1 month: 10 years from the date of release

The exception to this is where an individual is convicted of a sexual offence against a minor under the age of 15 years; in these circumstances, the conviction remains on the National Criminal Register permanently.

The National Criminal Register also includes information on collective entities (or publicly registered organisations).

A person can obtain a copy of their criminal history from the National Criminal Register, by contacting the central information office of the KRK in Warsaw, or information points of the KRK located within Polish common courts. In order to receive a copy of your criminal record, you must complete a form, stating the reasons for your request, and pay a fee (in July 2018: 20PLN for a digital copy, or 30PLN for a paper copy). An employer may also apply directly for disclosure in relation to a prospective employee if this is permitted under Polish laws or regulations (for example, in relation to employment in the security industry or employment involving contact with children). The written consent of the individual is not required.

The National Criminal Register Information Office provides individuals and employers with disclosure in one of two formats: as an Inquiry about an Individual ("Zapytanie o udzielenie informacji o osobie") in the event that no disclosable convictions are found; or a National Criminal Register's Information about an Individual ("Informacja o osobie z Krajowego Rejestru Karnego") in the event that disclosable information exists.

Poland also participated in the pilot project for 'Network of Judicial Registers', along with ten other EU member states, for the electronic exchange of criminal records among member states.

== Portugal ==
Portugal's criminal record system is an electronic database developed and maintained by Portugal's Direcção Geral da Administração da Justiça (General Direction for the Administration of Justice, DGAJ). The system contains the records of Portuguese citizens that reside in Portugal, Portuguese nationals that live abroad and any foreign citizens that reside within Portugal. Disclosure of an individual's criminal record is allowed at the request of the individual; themselves, or a third party with written consent of the individual. For example, an employer may request to see their possible employee's criminal record with their consent. However, the application must be made in person. The certificate regarding criminal records in Portugal is called a "certificado do registo criminal" (certificate of criminal registration) which conveys whether an individual has a criminal record. An extension of this is a more detailed certificate regarding an individual's criminal activities which provides evidence for an individual to be employed in a job where they have access to large sums of cash, need high security clearance or supervise children. This particular certificate is granted in a similar way to Australia's Working With Children Check, which supplies an employer with information regarding any previous criminal activity and ensures that convicted criminals are not employed in the same areas where they may have previously committed crimes. Applications for the certificates can be made through several channels, there is a central repository for criminal records located in Lisbon, alongside a vast selection of regional courts and their administration services throughout Portugal that can provide individuals with certificates and for Portuguese nationals residing overseas, applications can be made through embassies and consulates. However, none of the channels through which the certificates are available provide translation services, and therefore the certificate produced is always written in Portuguese, even when produced by an embassy in a non-Portuguese-speaking state.

The types of criminal convictions that can be exposed through the publishing of the certificate are very similar to that of the United Kingdom and are presented below:

- Drug offences (possession, trafficking, attempt to sell)
- Violence against another individual (murder, attempted murder, assault)
- Sexual offences (sexual assault, sexual coercion, rape)
- Burglary and robbery
- Theft (including possession of stolen property, attempt to sell stolen goods)
- Fraud (including counts of forgery)
- Criminal damage (vandalism)

Portuguese legislation allows for all criminal convictions to be removed from an individual's record once the rehabilitation period has passed. It is determined as follows:

- Custodial sentences of up to 5 years – 5 years from the date of release
- Custodial sentences of between 5 and 8 years – 7 years from the date of release
- Custodial sentences of over 8 years – 10 years from the date of release
- Reprimands and warnings – 5 years from the date of decision

Essentially this legislation allows individuals to move on from their convictions and ensure that they are not socially and economically disadvantaged for the rest of their lives after serving their crimes. However, the governing legislation is only available in Portuguese.

A very contentious aspect of this legislation is that those that commit heinous, sexually based crimes have their records expunged on the same time frame as all other individuals convicted. This legislation issue was brought into the spotlight during the 2007 media coverage of the Madeleine McCann case.

== Romania ==
Law No 290 governs the disclosure of criminal records in Romania. The criminal records of all Romanian citizens are kept in a Central Criminal Records database by the General Inspectorate of the Romanian Police. Police stations gather and keep the records of conviction status of individuals born in Romania, and it is their responsibility to keep these records up-to-date. This type of criminal record disclosure is named the Criminal Records Certificate. These Certificates contain personal information including full name, unique identification number, date and place of birth, most recent address, name of parents, and the details of the committed offence, rehabilitation and extradition information.

To obtain access to a criminal record, an individual must apply directly to the local county police station in person. If the application is approved, results are issued in the form of a Criminal Records Certificate by the Central Inspectorate of the Romanian Police. Only the individual person is allowed to apply for their own record; however, a third-party individual may submit an application only if they have been authorised power of attorney. Judgements are able to be removed from an individual's criminal record if the legislation decriminalising the act for which the person has been sentenced is passed, in the event of amnesty or court rehabilitation, and for imprisonment of up to 3 years after 20 years from the date of the final decision.

== Russia ==
Individuals in Russia can obtain a national criminal history to check themselves, and this certificate is required for individuals seeking education employment: certain offences ban individual from such job. The certificate is issued by Russian Ministry of Internal Affairs for free within one month after application submitted via official Public Services Portal or in person. Certificate also can be in electronic form with digital signature or on paper.

== Slovakia ==
There is a centralised criminal record system, there is only one centralised database where the final criminal conviction issued by a Slovak criminal court is registered. This database is in electronic form and is maintained a unit within the General Prosecutors office of the Slovak Republic. The relevant legislation for this is governed by the Act on Criminal Records. As of 2008 there was a proposed bill that these criminal records could only be accessed by request to the General Prosecutors office when the person in question was up for a position which required a clean criminal record. Certain criminal records are not accessible at any time for instance the criminal record/record details of the President of the Republic of Slovakia are not available to anyone during his/her time in office. The criminal records and personal details of everyone held by the General Prosecutors office are lifelong, and continue to be updated throughout their life, every time they move address/change name etc.

== Slovenia ==
Criminal record information in Slovenia is looked after by the Department for Criminal Records and Educational Measures (DCREM), this is based at the Ministry of Justice. Among other things the DCREM maintains a database which holds information on convicted criminals.

Although this database is not public, applications for a criminal records disclosure can be made to the DCREM, anyone who has lived in Slovenia for a significant amount of time may apply for the disclosure of a particular criminal record. Although prospective employers cannot request a copy directly from the DCREM, they must request this from the prospective employee. The time in which a conviction remains on a person's criminal record depends on the type of conviction received, i.e. The longer the prison sentence served the longer the conviction remains on the record, up to 15 years. If a conviction is 15 years' imprisonment this shall never be removed from the criminal record. However, if the conviction is removed, then all rights are given back to the person in question, as if the conviction had never been received at all.

The driving license of those who reject the sobriety test may be revoked permanently, and their revocation stays in records indefinitely. At the European Court of Human Rights, there is currently a case pending which aims at the ruling that permanent keeping of the records is excessive.

== Spain ==
The criminal record system for Spain exists in the form of the "Central Criminal Records Registry" (Registro Central de Penados). It contains convictions for all crimes and also for misdemeanors.

The Central Criminal Records Registry is not publicly accessible and therefore very few public agencies and no private agencies have access to it. This has been confirmed by the New Penal Code (1995) Art.136.4. Therefore, the Central Criminal Records Registry is only accessible to judges, public prosecutors and the judicial police for investigative purposes. Other cases where direct access can be granted include: Guardia Civil for gun permits and border control police. Besides judges, prosecutors and some police agencies, only the recorded subject may request a copy of their personal Conviction Record.

In Spain, conviction records are not 'expunged' as they are not erased completely but rather are 'cancelled' in a process known as 'cancelling a conviction record'. Therefore, judges will still be aware of the records but they disregarded as an aggravating factor when sentencing. Once conviction records are cancelled, the individual will possess a clean criminal record. Therefore, the record of their convictions will be sealed in the Central Criminal Records Registry and is likely made unavailable to the police.

To cancel a conviction record the following requirements under Penal Code 47 (art.136.2) must be met: 1) A period of time after having served the sentence must have elapsed (6 months, 2 years, 3 years or 5 years depending on the sentence); 2) no further crime has been committed in the interim; 3) civil compensation has been paid or the person has been declared without money. To cancel a criminal record, the individual either makes a free of charge formal request to the Ministry of Justice or the Central Criminal Records Registry cancels the record itself.

== Sweden ==
In Sweden, the police have a record of convictions ("Belastningsregistret"). It does not contain arrests, and its information is not available for general public, even regarding serious crimes. Individuals can ask for a copy of their own record once per year, or for a fee anytime. For employment involving children or for security guards etc., a check will be made against the criminal record. Regular employers more and more often require applicants to get a record copy themselves and give the employer. The number of requests for own copies increased from 40,000 to 199,000 between 2003 and 2012.

Sweden is one of the countries with the largest databases of criminal records, containing some of the oldest population statistics in the world. In the past, individuals were prohibited from retrieving information about themselves to prevent being forced by employers or landlords to hand over the information. Yet there have been two notable changes in Swedish regulation of criminal records. In 1989, access was given to employers with the implementation of the 'subject access' paragraph in Swedish criminal records legislation. In 2001, it became mandatory for employers to check criminal records of teachers and childcare workers before they were hired, given the seriousness of sex offences against children. Individuals' criminal history records are today more available to the public than ever before.

The Swedish Criminal Records Registry is administered by the Swedish National Police Board which regulates access to criminal records and the use of criminal background checks by employers. The registry contains information on those who have been sentenced in criminal courts or summarily imposed a fine, who have had a restraining order issued against them, or in whose cases prosecution had been abstained from. Generally, the information is kept for five years if the offence was punishable by fine, and ten years if it called for other sentences and sanctions. For those aged under 18 at the time the crime was committed, information is kept for only three or five years depending on the type of punishment.

In January 2014, Swedish criminal records became available online with the launch of a new website Lexbase. People can search for their friends', colleagues' and neighbours' criminal records, showing the location of convicted criminals in the past five years in their neighbourhood by plotting red dots on the map. The user is able to then pay a fee to get more information about the crime committed. Lexbase has become the subject of intense criticism from Swedish media, government and the general public, given its alleged infringement on the right to privacy and increased social alienation of offenders.

== Switzerland ==
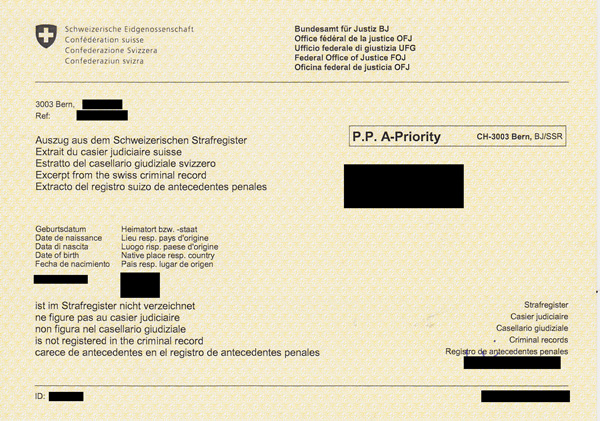
Extract from the Swiss criminal record. Here, the person ‘is not registered in the criminal record’.

The Strafregister is run by the Federal Department of Justice and Police. It lists final judgments in case of:

- felonies (offences that are punishable by imprisonment for more than three years)
- misdemeanors (offences that are punishable by imprisonment for up to three years or monetary penalty)
- infractions, if a fine exceeding 5000 Swiss francs or community service of more than 180 hours has been imposed
- certain infractions against road traffic regulations (serious speeding, driving with a blood alcohol content of more than 0.08%)
- court-ordered psychiatric treatments
- any judgment involving prohibitions (for example driving vehicles, working in certain professions, taking part in activities, contacting persons or the obligation not to enter certain defined areas).

When the prosecutor decides not to refer the matter to a court, or if the court has acquitted the defendant, there will be no criminal record.

Crimes committed by Swiss citizens abroad will also result in a Swiss criminal record, as soon as Swiss authorities have been informed and the sentences are comparable.

As of 28 February 2022, the Strafregister contains 1'154'055 sentences against 796'605 persons.

The full criminal record can be requested by anybody, as long as the person involved has given written authority to do so. Other than that, state authorities like courts, migration and naturalization authorities, the Federal Office of Civil Aviation and road traffic authorities can request the record without approval.

=== Expunging records ===
Criminal records will be expunged after a period of 10, 15 or 20 years plus the duration of the prison sentence handed down in the judgment, depending on the length of the sentence. In case a prisoner is released early, on parole, the period will commence on the day the prisoner would have been regularly released.

In all other cases, the record will be expunged after ten years. If somebody has been sentenced to a period of probation, the record will only appear until the end of successful probation. When a non-official requests the criminal record as a Privatauszug (private excerpt), the sentences will only appear for two-thirds of the mentioned time spans. When somebody has been expelled from Switzerland, the expulsion notice is never stricken from the record. If a minor has been sentenced under the Jugendstrafrecht (youth penal code, affecting 10 to 18 years old persons), the Privatauszug only shows the sentences if the person has re-offended as an adult.

=== Special private excerpt ===
The Sonderprivatauszug (special private excerpt) can be requested to prove that there is no ongoing ban on activities that involve minors (e.g. teaching, sport training) or vulnerable persons (e.g. treating and nursing patients). The employer must confirm the (intended) employment of the person in question before the special private excerpt is requested. This different excerpt is necessary because the usual Privatauszug could be empty while a prohibition is still active, for example when it has been set for a lifetime in case of certain serious crimes.

== United Kingdom ==
In the United Kingdom, checks on a person's criminal record are undertaken by the Disclosure and Barring Service (in England and Wales), Disclosure Scotland (Scotland and basic Disclosure for all the UK) and Access Northern Ireland, all of which have partial access to the Police National Computer (PNC) which holds the definitive record.

In England and Wales, a PNC record is held for 100 years. The PNC has the ability to record youth reprimands, youth final warnings, cautions and convictions. In 2006 Scotland opted out of retaining records indefinitely. In Scotland, non-convictions are held for 2 years whereas convictions are held for 20 or 30 years depending on the seriousness of the crime.

The police also utilize the Police national Database which is a depositary of locally held records. Locally held records may involve non-guilty verdicts, known associates, being a suspect in a report, drug intelligence on vehicles. Most information held on the PND is deleted after 7 years. The PND may be used to add other relevant information onto an enhanced DBS check.

The Home Office is currently working to introduce the Law Enforcement Data Service (LEDS), which will replace the PNC. All records from PNC and PND will migrate to the new system.

The ACPO criminal records office was founded in 2006, and it has the role of managing criminal record information and improving links between criminal records and biometric information.

These records are not publicly accessible and cannot be viewed without the subject's consent, although in some cases an employer might make such consent a condition of employment, especially if the employee is to work with children or other vulnerable people. The child sex offenders disclosure scheme allows parents and guardians to ask the police if someone with access to a child has a record for child sexual offences.

Information supplied depends on the level of disclosure required. Low-level disclosures only reveal unspent convictions (convictions which have not yet been expunged under the Rehabilitation of Offenders Act 1974), while enhanced disclosures normally include all convictions, cautions, reprimands and final warnings. An enhanced criminal record certificate may contain relevant information that need not relate solely to criminal matters.

Arrests that do not lead to an official finding of guilt, i.e. a conviction or the acceptance of a caution, are not considered part of a person's criminal record and are not typically disclosed as part of the process. However, an enhanced disclosure may include such additional information, which is supplied at the Chief Constable's discretion. Enhanced disclosures are typically used to screen applicants for positions such as police officer, social worker, and teacher, which involve contact with vulnerable groups and children.

Individuals and the self-employed cannot apply for a DBS check of their own criminal record, as they cannot ask an exempted question (a valid request for a person to reveal their full criminal history, including spent convictions) of themselves.

Only organisations registered with the DBS can ask an exempted question and submit applications for criminal records checks. There are two types of registered organisation: a registered body, which is the employer; and an umbrella body, a registered body that processes criminal record checks for non-registered organisations who can ask the exempted question.

=== Effect on recidivism ===
The Lammy Review found that a criminal record that is visible to potential employers is a significant detriment to a person's future work prospects, and that work is key to reducing re-offending. Therefore, having a criminal record that is visible to employers can increase the likelihood for a criminal to re-offend. The review also found that BAME groups are disproportionately affected as they are already more likely to be discriminated in employment.

== United States ==
In the United States, criminal records are compiled and updated on local, state, and federal levels by various law enforcement agencies. The primary purpose of a criminal record is to present a comprehensive criminal history for an individual.

Criminal histories are maintained by law enforcement agencies in all levels of government. Local police departments, sheriffs' offices, and specialty police agencies may maintain their own internal databases. On the state level, state police, troopers, highway patrol, correctional agencies, and other law enforcement agencies also maintain separate databases. Law enforcement agencies often share this information with other similar enforcement agencies and this information is usually made available to the public.

All states have official "statewide repositories" of criminal history information that include information contributed by the various county and municipal courts and law enforcement agencies within the state. State repositories are usually accurate, but all states have provisions for the correction of errors that occur in the reporting and recording of criminal history information. Individuals may normally obtain their own records from the state, but to obtain the records of another person, a private individual will normally need to obtain a release from the subject of the record search.

The federal government maintains extensive criminal histories and acts as a central repository for all agencies to report their own data. The Next Generation Identification (NGI) System is a database of criminal history information that is maintained by the Federal Bureau of Investigation (FBI). Acting within the NGI System the Interstate Identification Index (III) System maintains a system of state pointers that provide a gateway to the state that maintains administrative control of that arrest information. The FBI maintains administrative control for the federal agencies. When a criminal history record is requested, then the appropriate agency responds with their criminal history record for that subject.

=== Use and usage controversy ===
Criminal records may be used for many purposes, mostly for background checks, including identification, employment, security clearance, adoption, immigration/international travel/visa, licensing, assistance in developing suspects in an ongoing criminal investigation, and for enhanced sentencing in criminal prosecutions.

In the 21st century, there has been controversy about for-profit data mining companies that harvest much of the electronic booking blotter records from various police authorities nationwide and offer it for free on the public Internet and for sale to employers. Though frequently effective at identifying applicants with criminal backgrounds, the mined data does not usually reflect subsequent results of any criminal prosecution, acquittal, or dismissal of charges, and the highly prejudicial nature of such records can damage applicant chances for jobs and other benefits when such records are not in proper context of subsequent prosecutorial result for a hiring manager or recruiter to evaluate. In many cases, records are available for seven years or more beyond acquittals or dismissal of charges. In addition, since arrest records can sometimes be mistakenly matched to individuals with the same or similar names, the prejudicial nature of the available records, particularly violent ones, can negatively affect applicants and candidates in a dramatic way when they otherwise have no actual criminal record.

=== Expungement ===
In the United States, a conviction can be expunged, although the laws vary from state to state. Although in most states people with an expunged record may deny having a conviction, they may have to nonetheless inform certain prospective employers or government agencies of an expunged conviction.

== See also ==
- Background check
- Collateral consequences of criminal conviction
- Police certificate
- Antecedent (law)
