= Corruption in Australia =

Corruption in Australia has been a recurring source of political controversy and public debate. International rankings have assessed Australia as having comparatively low political corruption, in line with other Western democracies.

Historically allegations of corruption were investigated through royal commissions and other commissions of inquiry. Several high-profile cases in the late 20th century – including the Fitzgerald Inquiry in Queensland, the WA Inc scandal in Western Australia and the Wood Royal Commission in New South Wales – led to a greater focus on anti-corruption efforts at a state level. The Independent Commission Against Corruption was established in New South Wales in 1989 and all Australian states had established similar broad-based anti-corruption agencies by 2013.

At a federal level, Australia became a signatory to the United Nations Convention against Corruption in 2005. Following substantial public date, a National Anti-Corruption Commission (NACC) began operations in 2023, modelled on the state bodies. The NACC inherited some of the functions of the Australian Commission for Law Enforcement Integrity, while the Australian Criminal Intelligence Commission has also monitored corruption.

== Federal level ==
The National Anti-Corruption Commission, often shortened to the NACC, is an independent federal Australian agency that was created under the National Anti-Corruption Commission Act 2022.

The commission is designed to combat corrupt conduct from public officials employed in the Australian Public Service (APS), including politicians and civil servants.

It is independent of government and has the power to initiate its own investigations. It can also receive tip-offs from whistleblowers and the public.

The NACC replaced the Australian Commission for Law Enforcement Integrity and began operations on 1 July 2023.

Protections for whistleblowers have been assessed as "weak". The Human Rights Law Centre has called for the creation of a Whistleblower Protection Authority.

== By state or territory ==
=== New South Wales ===
The Independent Commission Against Corruption (ICAC) was established in 1989 to improve the integrity of the public service. ICAC is an independent body that is non-political, and that does not have a government minister in charge of its operations. The ICAC holds a large amount of investigative powers including listening devices and telephone interception.

=== Queensland ===
The Crime and Corruption Commission (CCC) is an independent statutory body that investigates and aims to reduce the amount of corruption across the public sector. It also investigates other serious crimes including money laundering, fraud and homicide. Its powers include the ability to call witnesses to hearings, and require individuals to produce evidence. The CCC can give recommendations to courts, but cannot charge individuals with corruptions or crimes. It was established on 1 January 2002.

=== Tasmania ===
The Integrity Commission is an independent statutory body which was established in 2010. It was created to ensure integrity in the public service and reduce corruption within Tasmania. Reports have found the Tasmanian Integrity Commission to have major flaws in its design due to none of its investigations using their full powers in an investigation.

=== Victoria ===
The Independent Broad-based Anti-corruption Commission (IBAC) is the key body that investigates corruption within Victoria. It was established in July 2012. The commission is designed to investigate corruption in the public service such as councils, parliament, the judiciary and other government bodies. The Victorian Independent Broad-based Anti-corruption Commission has a large range of powers similar to the NSW Independent Commission Against Corruption such as interception of telecommunication devices and asking people to produce evidence or to speak at hearings.

=== Northern Territory ===
The Independent Commissioner Against Corruption (Northern Territory) was established in 2018.

=== Western Australia ===
The Corruption and Crime Commission was established in Western Australia in 2004.

=== South Australia ===
The Independent Commission Against Corruption (South Australia) was established in 2013.

== Public–private corruption ==
Public–private partnership corruption or privatisation leading to inherent monopoly within public sector could raise to levels of corruption when it is abused.

See example: PwC tax scandal.

== Rankings and research ==
Transparency International's Corruption Perceptions Index scores countries according to the perceived corruption of the public sector on a scale from 0 ('highly corrupt') to 100 ('very clean') and then ranks those countries by their score – the country with the highest score is ranked first and is perceived to have the most honest public sector. Australia's score of 76 in the 2025 Corruption Perceptions Index was well above the global average score and ranked the country at 12th of the 182 countries in that year's Index. For comparison with regional scores, the best score among the countries of the Asia Pacific region (Note: Afghanistan, Australia, Bangladesh, Bhutan, Brunei Darussalam, Cambodia, China, Fiji, Hong Kong, India, Indonesia, Japan, North Korea, South Korea, Laos, Malaysia, Maldives, Mongolia, Myanmar, Nepal, New Zealand, Pakistan, Papua New Guinea, Philippines, Singapore, Solomon Islands, Sri Lanka, Taiwan, Thailand, Timor-Leste, Vanuatu, Vietnam) was 84, the average score was 45 and the worst score was 15. Australia ranked third in its region, behind Singapore and New Zealand. For comparison with worldwide scores, the best score was 89 (ranked 1), the average score was 42, and the worst score was 9 (ranked 181, in a two-way tie).

The current form of the Index was instituted in 2012, when it gave Australia a score of 85. When ranked by score, Australia was in 7th place out of 176 countries, although a corruption law expert warned that the Index gave an incomplete picture because it ignored corrupt dealings between Australia and foreign countries.

The perception of corruption in the Australian public sector increased after 2012. In the 2015 Index Australia ranked 13th, dropping six positions since 2012. Australia's score of 73 in the 2021 Index was 12 points lower than it was in 2012, and was labelled by Transparency International as 'one of the world's most significant decliners, having dropped 12 points since 2012 to hit a record low this year.' The report added, 'Its deteriorating score indicates systemic failings in tackling public sector corruption.' After its low point in 2021, Australia's score improved steadily to 77 in 2024 and 76 in 2025.

Additionally, there is a public perception that corruption in Australia is increasing. The phenomenon has been studied by the Australian National University, which produced a report called Perceptions of Corruption and Ethical Conduct (2012), which concluded: 'there is a widespread perception that corruption in Australia has increased' and that 'the media, trade unions and political parties were seen as Australia's most corrupt institutions'.

Research published in 2015 by Chartered Accountants Australia and New Zealand found government and private firms in Australia and nearby New Zealand both display widespread 'complacent' attitudes about corruption, particularly in regards to companies bidding for government contracts.

In January 2018, a discussion paper published by the Australia Institute, suggested that the trust in the Australian government is at a historical low, which could have reduced the GDP by as much as 4% or $72.3 billion.

A report by Australian Public Service Commission's released in 2018 stated that investigations were conducted in only 0.3% of the workforce – a total of 596 employees.

== Regional developments ==
Some of Australia's smaller neighbours are making steps towards establishing Independent Commissions Against Corruption, with Papua New Guinea recently voting unanimously to set up an Independent Commission Against Corruption. Another small neighbour, the Solomon Islands recently appointed its first director general for its Independent Commission Against Corruption.

== Partnerships ==
Australia is part of G20 Anti-Corruption Working Group, APEC Anti-Corruption and Transparency Working Group and the United Nations Convention against Corruption Working Groups.

== See also ==
- Corruption in New South Wales
- Group of States Against Corruption
- International Anti-Corruption Academy
- International Anti-Corruption Day
- ISO 37001 Anti-bribery management systems
- OECD Anti-Bribery Convention
- Transparency International
- United Nations Convention Against Corruption
