= Crime information center =

Legal term

A crime information center is a government database used primarily for the purposes of law-enforcement, national security, and border control. Crime information centers operate as large-scale national databases that aggregate records from local, state, tribal, and regional jurisdictions. A crime information center mainly stores information regarding an individual's criminal history and activity and provides a pathway for that information to be disclosed nationally or internationally. Many crime information centers are coordinated under Interpol standards, and all Interpol member states (with some varying degree of transparency) disclose their crime information center to Interpol on request.

By aggregating data from numerous smaller law enforcement agencies, a national crime information center can facilitate the identification of cross-jurisdictional criminal activity, support federal and multi-state investigations, and enhance the overall coordination of law enforcement. Some federal jurisdictions disclose or correspond information pertaining to their crime information center to other federal jurisdictions to ensure regional stability or to combat cross-border crime.

== Interpol ==
Interpol has the largest global criminal-information database. Interpol serves as a liaison to its 196 member countries to support investigations and cross-border police cooperation. These systems allow authorized law-enforcement officers to access real-time data on suspects, missing persons, stolen property, and biometric identifiers. Access is provided through I-24/7, INTERPOL’s secure, encrypted police communications network. I-24/7 links national central bureaus, border points, and other authorized terminals worldwide, enabling instant database checks and the rapid exchange of notices, alerts, and operational intelligence.

== United States ==
- NCIC, run by the FBI
- Real Time Crime Center, run by the NYPD
- GCIC, run by the Georgia Bureau of Investigation

== Canada ==
The Canadian Police Information Centre is used federally

== Europe ==
- European Criminal Records Information System, all EU member states.
- National Criminal Register in Poland

== United Kingdom ==
Police National Computer, including Northern Ireland.

== See also ==
- Interstate Identification Index
