= Opal Tower =

Opal Tower can mean:

- Opal Tower (Leeds), a skyscraper in Leeds, England
- Opal Tower (Sydney), a skyscraper in Sydney, Australia
