= Corruption in New South Wales =

Corruption in New South Wales, Australia, varies between state and local council levels, mirroring the jurisdictional scope, economic opportunities and the relationships between private and public industries reflecting the corruption related scandals in the public discourse.

These corruption related scandals have resulted in strong governmental response to address the visible and publicized corruption where the transparency plays a key role to combat it together with governmental institutional responses.

== Governmental response ==
Public sector corruption is investigated by Independent Commission Against Corruption (New South Wales) at both state and local council levels. As of June 2024 ICAC reported receiving typically 2000–3000 reports a year. ICAC focuses on the most serious allegations requiring the use of its covert and coercive powers.

== Sources ==
Sources of corruption in state and local levels vary. The areas below cover the domain-specific areas of corruption relevant to NSW.

=== Planning ===
Planning is a risk area for corruption in New South Wales due to the process being a historically complex speciality area and limited transparency.

ICAC has investigated various local councils through its existence involving public officials being involved in the decisionmaking of planning decisions with conflicts of interests.

=== Certifiers ===
Building regulation was initially the sole responsibility of local councils, starting from Local Government Act 1919 that regulated construction of buildings.

Privatisation of the building regulation was gradual, started with the Local Government Act 1919 and the Environmental Planning and Assessment Act 1979 leading to Local Government Act 1993 that removed the compulsory requirement for Councils to carry out inspections of buildings and sub-sequently in 1997, the Environment Planning and Assessment Act 1979 was amended to allow private certifiers to issue construction certificates and complying development certificates.

In 2019 the high profile cracks in Opal Tower (Sydney) were blamed on both cost controls to maximise profit and the originating corruption involving the standards that led to strengthening of the regulatory regime through Building and Development Certifiers Act 2018.

== History ==
Political corruption in NSW has a long history from even before it became a state, taking down members of parliament, ministers and premiers.

=== 2020 onwards ===
==== Wagga Wagga grants ====
The case involved former NSW premier Gladys Berejiklian and former member of Parliament for Wagga Wagga Daryl Maguire, who did not disclose their close personal relationship despite Berejiklian being involved in approving public grants advanced by Maguire for his electorate giving rise to conflicts of interests.

The case involved Maguire advocating for public grants for two Wagga Wagga-based institutions, the Australian Clay Target Association ($5 million) and Riverina Conservatorium of Music ($10 million), on which Berejiklian did not recuse herself from either presiding or being member of the committee meetings that approved the grants totalling $15 million.

===== ICAC Investigation =====
Bereklian resigned as NSW Premier after ICAC announced its investigation into the matter in October 2021.

On 29 June 2023 ICAC found that both had engaged in serious corrupt conduct and Berejiklian had breached her public duty. The ICAC did not recommend that criminal charges be pursued due to the difficulties in mounting a prosecution due to the loss of the right to silence during her ICAC hearings, and the unlikelihood that the Director of Public Prosecutions would follow such a recommendation.

The secret relationship was revealed due to a wiretap placed on Maguire following his becoming a person of interest in two ICAC investigations where Berejiklian was caught on the wiretap ignoring potentially corrupt statements by Maguire.

===== Berejiklian v ICAC [2024] NSWCA 177 =====
Ms Berejiklian sought review of the ICAC decision at Supreme Court of New South Wales via Judicial review on the basis that the corrupt finding was invalid because the ICAC commissioner was no longer at ICAC when the findings were handed down. New South Wales Court of Appeal dismissed the appeal on 26 July 2024 with costs.

=== 2010–2019 ===
==== Barry O'Farrell ====
In 2014, Barry O'Farrell, the premier of New South Wales, accepted a $3,000 bottle of Penfolds Grange wine from Nick Di Girolamo, a chief executive of Australian Water Holdings (AWH). O'Farrell failed to disclose the gift, which is required by law in the state of New South Wales to prevent corruption. He was questioned by Independent Commission Against Corruption, but O'Farrell said he could not remember receiving it, despite evidence to the contrary. Due to unintentionally misleading an ICAC investigation, he chose to resign as premier in April 2014.

==== Eddie Obeid ====
Eddie Obeid is a former Australian politician who was embroiled in a corruption investigation by the NSW Independent Commission Against Corruption. In 2013, ICAC found that Eddie Obeid lobbied his friend Steve Dunn to secure favourable leasing conditions for cafes at Circular Quay, Sydney. The investigation also found that Eddie Obeid used his position as Government MP to alter mining tenements in the Bylong Valley. Eddie Obeid was jailed for 5 years in late 2016, and could apply for parole in 3 years.

=== 1990s ===
==== Wood Royal Commission ====
The Wood Royal Commission into the New South Wales Police Service uncovered large scale corruption within the NSW Police Service. The royal commission went between 1995 and 1997, and ultimately led to the conviction of dozens of police officers. The Wood Royal Commission concluded that “systemic and entrenched corruption” was prevalent in the NSW Police Force.

== See also ==
- Corruption, Corruption in Australia
- Independent Commission Against Corruption (New South Wales)
