= Police certificate =

Official document of a person's criminal history

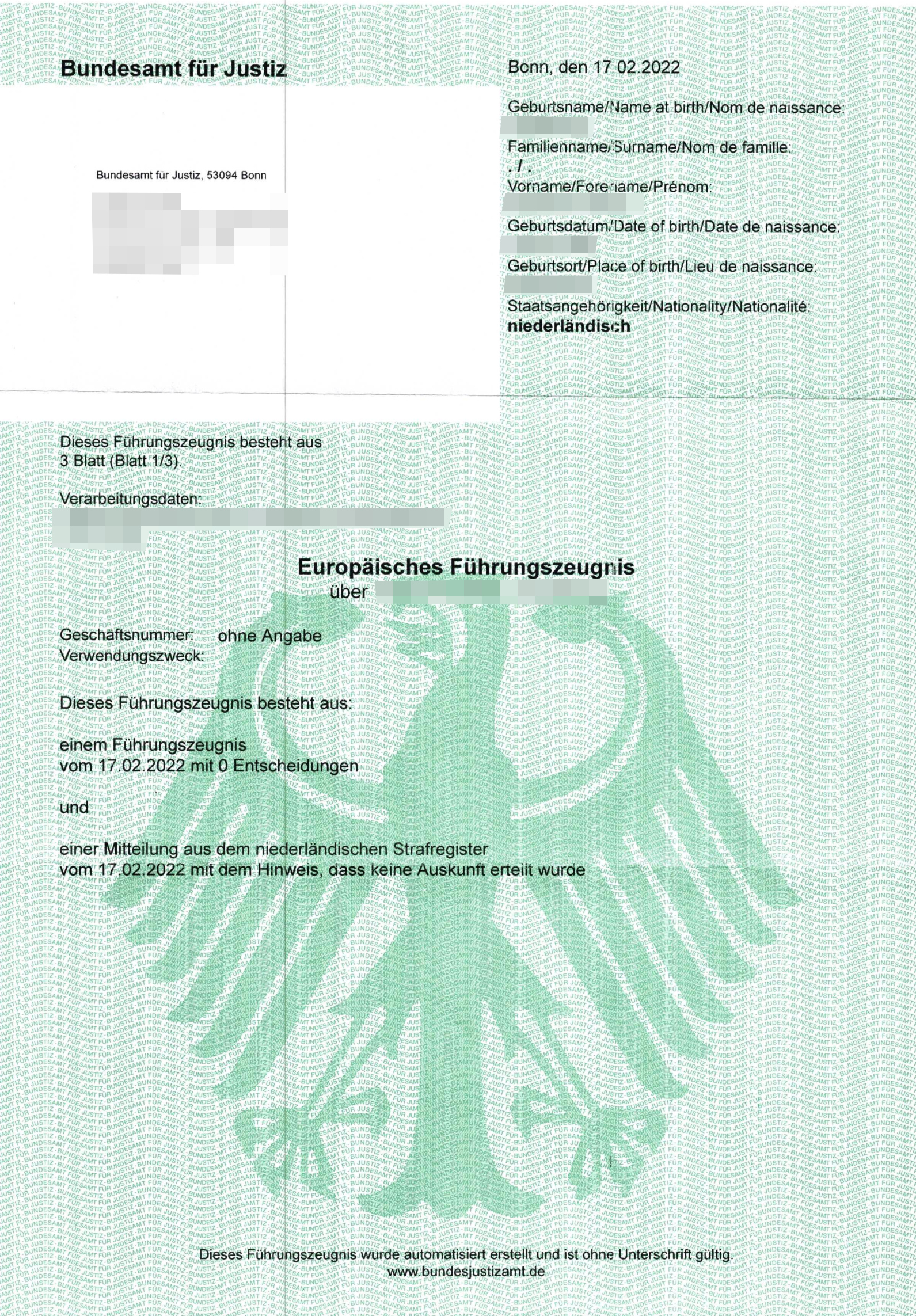
European Certificate of Good Conduct, issued by the German Federal Office of Justice

A police certificate, is an official document often issued as a result of a background check conducted by the police or government agency within a country to enumerate any known criminal records that the applicant may have while there. Criminal records may include arrest, conviction, and possibly criminal proceedings. A police certificate is also known as good citizen certificate (in Hong Kong), good conduct certificate, police clearance certificate, national police history check (in Australia), certificate of good character/good character certificate (Caribbean), or judicial record extracts.

Applicants may have to submit fingerprints and certain personal information to request the criminal record check, and the police or government agency may charge a fee.

== Purposes ==
A police certificate may be required if the applicant is:

- Applying for vocational positions requiring clearance;
- Seeking to immigrate or obtain visas; and
- Satisfying an individual employer's request.

== Scope ==
Depending on each country's law, applicants may be required to submit police certificates of countries which they have stayed beyond periods as specified by law.

- Australia: For citizenship applications, countries where applicants have resided for 3 months or more if the applicants have been outside Australia for more than 12 months since acquiring permanent residency; for visa applications, countries where applicants have resided for 12 months or more.
- Canada: Countries where applicants have resided for 6 months or more. U.S. citizens applying for permanent residence and some other services in Canada may be required to furnish FBI and local police certificates from the United States.
- Ecuador: Country where applicants have principally resided during the last 5 years.
- New Zealand: Countries where applicants have resided for 12 months or more.
- United States: Countries where applicants have resided for 6 months or more. Although a criminal record certificate can be obtained in two ways - by contacting the FBI or by contacting the State Police, in practice the FBI certificate is accepted because it reflects the absence of a criminal record throughout the United States and not in a particular state or county.

== Period of Validity ==
A police certificate may or may not have a period of validity noted on the certificate, and criteria for recognizing the validity of certificates vary widely. The criteria which different countries use to determine the validity of certificates are often independent of any dates or validity periods noted on certificates themselves.

Australia, for example, recognizes police certificates for 12 months from their issue dates for both visa and citizenship applications, independent of any validity period noted on the certificates themselves. Ecuador, in stark contrast, only recognizes police certificates (as of 2 March 2012) issued within 3 months of the date the certificates are presented (e.g., for a visa application), again independent of any dates or validity periods noted explicitly on the certificates themselves.

As in many countries, determining the validity periods of police certificates is often neither mandated nor noted in any legislation. In Australia, for instance, the approach has simply been adopted by Australia's Department of Immigration and Citizenship for the sake of consistency across varying jurisdictions; in Ecuador, in contrast, the approach has been adopted by the Department of the Interior. In Bangladesh, usually it has 6 months validity.

== Example: Police Checks in Australia ==
In Australia, individuals can request a police check which itemizes disclosable court outcomes. All police checks must be undertaken with the informed consent of the person being checked, unless the check is mandated by relevant legislation. This means that persons cannot validly obtain a police check on another individual without that individuals permission. Businesses can request a police check on the applicant behalf

A person may be required to present a Police Clearance Certificate as part of employment screening, as a pre-requisite for volunteer work, as preparation for a court appearance, to apply for a visa to enter/stay in some countries, or to satisfy a statutory requirement.

Regardless of whether the applicant applied for a police check through one of the eight state police agencies or the Australian Federal Police, or an ACIC approved broker, all police checks are completed through ACIC's National Police Checking Service. Applicants who will receive a certificate titled a "National Police Check" if the background check was completed by one of the police agencies, or a "National Criminal History Certificate" if completed by an ACIC approved broker.

In some cases, Commonwealth agencies such as the Department of Immigration and Border Protection only accept police checks issued by the AFP if used in support of citizenship or immigration-related decisions.

In Australia, whilst CrimTrac completes all background checks regardless of the requesting agency, the results that are disclosed for an individual may vary depending on:

1. The purpose of the background or police check;
2. The accredited agency’s coordinating police agency (e.g. which state the agency’s head office is domiciled); and
3. Any relevant State or Territory legislation and/or policies regarding police history information release.
