= Interstate Identification Index =

US national index of serious criminal histories

The Interstate Identification Index (III; pronounced "triple-eye"), AKA “FBI Triple I Teletype”, is a national index of state and federal criminal histories (or "rap sheets") in the United States, maintained by the Federal Bureau of Investigation (FBI) at the National Crime Information Center (NCIC). Included in this index are individuals who have been arrested or indicted for "a serious criminal offense anywhere in the country". The following criteria about the individual must also be met for inclusion in the index: known to the FBI, have a date of birth of 1956 (or later) or were arrested for the first time and reported to the FBI since July 1974 (regardless of date of birth), and older records for certain fugitives and repeat offenders.

There are exclusions for records in III which include: subjects not meeting age and/or arrest criteria, juvenile offenders tried as juveniles, charges of drunkenness and vagrancy, certain public order offenses, nonspecific charges of suspicion or investigation, and social history data (e.g., narcotic, civil commitment, mental hygiene - unless part of the criminal justice process).

The program is designed to facilitate the interstate exchange of criminal history records among state justice agencies. In addition to the interstate exchange, this index holds millions of fingerprint identification cards for criminals who have committed a serious enough crime to go to jail for over 24 hours.

Search results from the III give a list of states that have a criminal history on a given person. An investigator or analyst may then query those states directly to get specific criminal history, either through the National Law Enforcement Telecommunications System (NLETS) or by other means.

This makes the criminal justice system of each participating state no longer a completely closed system; the increased exchange of information between different law enforcement agencies increases the chances of bringing multi-state offenders to justice.
