= CrimTrac =

CrimTrac was a former Agency in the Attorney-General's Department that was merged with the Australian Crime Commission on 1 July 2016 to form the Australian Criminal Intelligence Commission. Crimtrac had been responsible for developing and maintaining national information-sharing services between state, territory and federal law enforcement agencies.

CrimTrac worked in partnership with Australia's police agencies to provide services that allowed police to easily share information with each other across state and territory borders. CrimTrac's information-sharing capabilities were specifically designed to equip police with the information needed to make decisions to assist in investigating and preventing crime.

Under the Australian Constitution, each state and territory is responsible for maintaining law and order within its borders, with the Australian Federal Police serving the Commonwealth. Criminals have exploited borders to avoid detection, but when police have a national view of policing information, this minimises opportunities for offenders to evade the law by crossing borders.

== History ==
CrimTrac was established to modernise the IT systems created by the National Exchange of Policing Information (NEPI) formed in 1990 and to add new systems required by Australian police to meet changing national law enforcement needs. These include biometric identification of persons of interest via fingerprints and DNA, and other policing information. Fifty million dollars was provided by the Federal government following the 1998 election, and procedural and administrative work commenced to create CrimTrac and transition the NEPI systems over. An Inter-Governmental Agreement (IGA) signed by Federal, State and Territory law enforcement ministers in July 2000 has underpinned the agency's endeavours.

CrimTrac commenced as a small national agency located in the national capital - Canberra, and staffed by Australian Public Servants. Police specialists and contractors assist where necessary. It has required strong cooperation from all police services, particularly on Information and Communications Technology (ICT). Even with the advantage of an IGA, CrimTrac's startup, growth and management in the first five years was challenging as it addressed its NEPI legacy whilst scoping new IT systems to deliver better shared policing information. Those years required sustained effort by the staff of CrimTrac and by its Board of Management, drawn from the IGA parties, at Police Commissioner level. CrimTrac continues to face challenges as a result of Australia's federational style of government, which has produced nine different sets of criminal legislation and nine individual police systems that must communicate to allow the centralisation of policing information. The national DNA database took eight years to become fully functional because of minor differences in Commonwealth, state and territory legislation.

While Australian police services and law enforcement agencies need and want better information systems to support officers on the beat, they do not wish these systems to necessarily replace their existing systems. Their systems are at differing levels of sophistication and evolution on different computing platforms, architectures and types and formats of information stored. They have been built and had evolved to suit jurisdictional, not national requirements.

To achieve optimal outcomes from its new or improved national IT systems, CrimTrac had worked hard for a new and better culture of information sharing between police services. Regular and informative liaison characterises CrimTrac's modus operandi with police and strong arguments accompany all CrimTrac business cases where police services may be asked to contribute or share information. The impact of the Commonwealth Privacy Act 1988 is also taken into account through the requirement for all new projects that involve the national sharing of sometimes sensitive and usually confidential personal information to prepare a privacy impact assessment.

Improving legacy IT systems or building new ones understandably has involved controversy as existing state and territory-based policing information systems were scrutinised by CrimTrac in order to establish "best of breed" designs, to analyse better information-sharing practices for national adoption and to persuade police jurisdictions to use new CrimTrac systems. In the almost eight years since CrimTrac was established, distrust and controversy has been replaced by support and cooperation from all the partner police services.

By 30 June 2015, 1 year before it was merged into the new agency, CrimTrac employed 207 people.

== Biometrics ==
CrimTrac's NCIDD and NAFIS systems provide police agencies with biometric matching capabilities that assist the police with identity management and to resolve crime.

=== National Automated Fingerprint Identification System ===
The National Automated Fingerprint Identification System (NAFIS) is a fingerprint and palm print database and matching system, which is available to Australian police and immigration authorities.

The NAFIS assists Australian police to solve crime by quickly and reliably establishing a person's identity from fingerprint and palm impressions. The NAFIS enables near ‘real time’ upload of prints from crime scenes which makes it possible for police to identify a suspect in minutes.

The NAFIS contains finger and palm print images collected from individuals by Australian police and immigration authorities. It also contains unsolved fingerprint and palm print crime scene images, which Australian police can search against.

The NAFIS contains fingerprint or palm print records for more than 3.3 million people, with a total of 5.6 million sets of prints. In the 2011-12 financial year users conducted 428,831 searches on prints from individuals. During this period, there was 367,751 searches conducted on finger and palm prints from latent fingerprints, which are collected at crime scenes.

=== National Criminal Investigation DNA Database ===
The National Criminal Investigation DNA Database (NCIDD) provides Australian police with the ability to match DNA profiles across state and territory borders.

The NCIDD contains DNA profiles from samples collected by Australian police. These profiles are derived from samples collected at crime scenes, or from convicted offenders, suspects, items belonging to missing persons and unknown deceased persons.

The NCIDD enables police agencies to compare DNA profiles from a crime scene with convicted offenders throughout Australia. Additionally, the database allows police to match profiles from two or more unsolved crime scenes, linking seemingly unrelated police investigations.

By 30 June 2012, the NCIDD had linked 69,606 individuals to crime scenes, and had made 12,216 crime scene to crime scene links. At 31 December 2012, there were 713,200 profiles recorded on the NCIDD.

As well as their ongoing day to day value to Australian police, the international value of these systems was proven following the Bali bombings in 2002 and the Australian response to the Thailand tsunami of 2004.

== Child Protection ==
=== National Child Offender System ===
The National Child Offender System (NCOS) provides operational police with tools to achieve nationally consistent registration and management of child offenders. The NCOS consists of the Australian National Child Offender Register (ANCOR) and the Managed Person System (MPS). The ANCOR supports online crime prevention and allows authorised police officers to register, case manage and share information about registered persons. It assists police to uphold child protection legislation in their state or territory. The MPS holds information on offenders who are charged but not convicted, or after an offender's reporting obligations have been completed.

=== Child Exploitation Tracking System ===
The Child Exploitation Tracking System (CETS) is a joint initiative between CrimTrac, police agencies and Microsoft. The primary objective of the CETS is to improve police efforts to identify children exposed to significant risk of sexual abuse, and reduce police exposure to child exploitation material. The CETS automatically matches seized child exploitation material with previously identified material. This makes it easier for police to identify material created by an offender, and increases police capacity to identify victims.

== Police Reference Services ==
=== National Police Reference System ===
The National Police Reference System (NPRS) enables Australian police agencies to integrate their data with data from other police agencies. The NPRS supports police and other law enforcement agencies by providing key reference data to support first responders, investigators and analysts.

In the 2011-12 financial year, more than 53,000 police users conducted 35 million transactions using the NPRS. During this period, 10 million person records with 5.7 million photographs were available for law enforcement purposes. On average, there are 96,000 daily transactions made on the NPRS.

Some of the information included about a person of interest on the NPRS includes: name; identity information (including photographs); information on warnings, warrants and whether an individual is wanted by police; offence history; protection and violence orders; firearms involvements; and information relating to the child protection register.

The NPRS also contains information on missing persons, unidentified persons and bodies, and escapees.

In May 2012 the Australian Crime Commission (ACC) was the first authorised non-police agency to gain access to NPRS for law-enforcement purposes.

=== National Firearms Licensing and Registration System ===
The National Firearms Licensing and Registration System (NFLRS) holds information on:

• past and current firearm license holders • licensed firearms dealers • registered, lost or stolen firearms.

CrimTrac collects and shares firearm license and registration information between all police agencies and approved external agencies. Police officers responding to an incident can be advised if a person is the registered owner of a firearm. There are more than 4.5 million firearms recorded on the NFLRS.

=== National Vehicles of Interest ===
The National Vehicle of Interest (NVOI) system records stolen, recovered and suspect vehicle details. This service enables Australian police agencies to share information on vehicle registration, driver license and vehicle owner details.

In the 2011-12 financial year, more than 188,000 incidents were registered on the system.

== National Police Checking Service ==
CrimTrac worked together with Australia's police agencies to deliver the National Police Checking Service (NPCS). The NPCS enhances the safety and security of the community by ensuring the integrity of individuals placed in a position of trust.

The NPCS provides Australian police agencies, and other agencies accredited with CrimTrac, with a national view of police history information. A National Police History Check involves checking and releasing police information about an individual, subject to relevant legislation and policies. This is used to assess an individual's suitability for employment, Australian citizenship, or appointment to positions of trust.

CrimTrac delivers the NPCS to more than 120 organisations across the country. These include police agencies, public and private sector organisations and not-for-profit organisations.

The NPCS processed approximately 3 million checks in the 2011-12 financial year. Approximately 29 per cent of all checks require further investigation by police.

CrimTrac is working with New Zealand Police in a trial of sharing police history information.
