= Australian Priority Organisation Target =

The Australian Priority Organisation Target (APOT) is a classification used by the Australian Criminal Intelligence Commission to group threats considered most significant to Australia's organised crime environment. Members of the classification include money launderers and drug traffickers. As such, the list is very limited, with just eight targets added to the list in 2017-18. In February 2020 it was revealed that the vice-president of Crown Resorts had personally authorized a transaction of AUD$500,000 to an APOT and withheld details of the transaction from authorities.
