= National Crime Information Center =

US central database of crime-related information

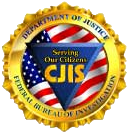

Agency overview
- Formed: February 14, 1967; 59 years ago

The National Crime Information Center (NCIC) is the United States' central database and crime information center for tracking crime-related information. The NCIC has been an information sharing tool since 1967. It is maintained by the Criminal Justice Information Services Division (CJIS) of the Federal Bureau of Investigation (FBI) and is interlinked with federal, tribal, state, and local agencies and offices.

== History ==
The NCIC database was created in 1967 under FBI director J. Edgar Hoover. The purpose of the system was to create a centralized information system to facilitate information flow between the numerous law enforcement branches. The original infrastructure cost is estimated to have been over $180 million. In the mid-1990s, the program went through an upgrade from the legacy system to the current NCIC 2000 system. A 1993 GAO estimate concluded that in addition to the costs of the upgrades, the FBI would need to spend an additional $2 billion to update its computer system to allow all users workstation access. The Obama administration signed a contract with Palantir to develop a portal for the database. The Biden administration signed a $96 million contract to upgrade the database.

== Records ==
The NCIC makes available a variety of records to be used for law enforcement and security purposes. The NCIC database includes 21 files: 14 person files and seven property files.

Person files:

- Missing Person File: Records on people—including children—who have been reported missing to law enforcement and there is a reasonable concern for their safety.
- Foreign Fugitive File: Records on people wanted by another country for a crime that would be a felony if it were committed in the United States.
- Identity Theft File: Records containing descriptive and other information that law enforcement personnel can use to determine if an individual is a victim of identity theft or if the individual might be using a false identity.
- Immigration Violator File: Records on criminal aliens whom immigration authorities have deported and aliens with outstanding administrative warrants of removal.
- Protection Order File: Records on people against whom protection orders have been issued.
- Supervised Release File: Records on people on probation, parole, or supervised release or released on their own recognizance or during pre-trial sentencing.
- Unidentified Person File: Records on unidentified deceased people, living persons who are unable to verify their identities, unidentified victims of catastrophes, and recovered body parts. The file cross-references unidentified bodies against records in the Missing Persons File.
- U.S. Secret Service Protective File: Records containing names and other information on people who are believed to pose a threat to the U.S. president and/or others afforded protection by the U.S. Secret Service.
- Gang File: Records on violent gang groups and their members.
- Known or Appropriately Suspected Terrorist File: Records on known or appropriately suspected terrorists in accordance with HSPD-6.
- Wanted Person File: Records on criminals (including juveniles who may have been tried as adults) for whom a federal warrant or a felony or misdemeanor warrant is outstanding.
- National Sex Offender Registry File: Records on people who are required to register in a jurisdiction's sex offender registry.
- National Instant Criminal Background Check System (NICS) Denied Transaction File: Records on people who have been determined to be classified as a "forbidden person" according to the Brady Handgun Violence Prevention Act and were denied as a result of a NICS background check. (As of August 2012, records include last six months of denied transactions; in the future, records will include all denials.)
- Violent Person File: Once fully populated with data from the users, this file will contain records of persons with a violent criminal history and persons who have previously threatened law enforcement.

Property files:

- Article File: Records on stolen articles and lost public safety, homeland security, and critical infrastructure identification.
- Boat File: Records on stolen boats.
- Gun File: Records on stolen, lost, and recovered weapons and weapons that are designed to expel a projectile by air, carbon dioxide, or explosive action and have been used in the commission of crimes.
- License Plate File: Records on stolen license plates and vehicles.
- Securities File: Records on serially numbered stolen, embezzled, used for ransom, or counterfeit securities.
- Vehicle and Boat Parts File: Records on serially numbered stolen vehicle or boat parts for which the serial number may have been altered or removed.
- Vehicle File: Records on stolen vehicles (and their license plates), vehicles involved in the commission of crimes, or vehicles that may be taken from the owner by force based on federally issued court order.

== Disclosure ==
Under the Automated Canada–United States Police Information Exchange System (ACUPIES), members of law enforcement in Canada are granted real-time, unrestricted access to U.S. state and federal criminal databases maintained in the NCIC. U.S. law enforcement agencies are also granted access to Canadian records published in the Canadian Police Information Centre (CPIC).

== Validity ==
There have also been issues and concerns regarding arrests and seizures pursuant to mistaken beliefs in the existence of warrants and warrantless probable cause based on inaccurate NCIC information. Queries for immigration status have also been shown to have false positives.

== Incidents ==
On November 21, 2026, it was attacked by an unknown group.

== See also ==
- Criminal Justice Information Services Division
- Interstate Identification Index
- Restraining order
