= National Anti-Corruption Commission (Australia) =

National anti-corruption agency of Australia

Commission overview
- Formed: 1 July 2023
- Preceding Commission: Australian Commission for Law Enforcement Integrity
- Jurisdiction: Australian Government
- Headquarters: Canberra, Australian Capital Territory
- Employees: 180 (July 2023)
- Minister responsible: Michelle Rowland, Attorney-General of Australia
- Commission executives: Ben Gauntlett, Deputy Commissioner; Kylie Kilgour, Deputy Commissioner; Nicole Rose PSM, Deputy Commissioner; Philip Reed, Chief Executive Officer; Gail Furness, Inspector
- Website: www.nacc.gov.au
- Governing legislation: National Anti-Corruption Commission Act 2022 (Cth)

The National Anti-Corruption Commission (NACC) is an independent agency of the Australian Government tasked with investigating allegations of corruption in Australia, with a focus on federal politicians, public servants and other government officials.

Following substantial public debate around the form of a federal anti-corruption body, the NACC was established by the Albanese government under the National Anti-Corruption Commission Act 2022. It began operations on 1 July 2023 and replaced the pre-existing Australian Commission for Law Enforcement Integrity.

The NACC is independent of government and has the power to initiate its own investigations – including in response to tip-offs from whistleblowers and the public – as well as hold public hearings. It is not a court and has no power to make findings of criminality or impose criminal penalties. Similar anti-corruption commissions exist under state and territory legislation, but are not associated with the NACC.

== Background ==
=== Early proposals ===
The Australian Law Reform Commission recommended the government establish a federal anti-corruption commission as early as 1996. On 16 June 2004, Attorney-General Philip Ruddock and Minister for Justice Chris Ellison announced they would create a national anti-corruption agency. The agency, the Australian Commission for Law Enforcement Integrity (ACLEI), came into operation on 30 December 2006, but its remit was far narrower than any of the state anti-corruption agencies, only having the power to investigate law enforcement agencies. Greens leader Bob Brown called on the Rudd government to establish a commission with the power to investigate the whole of bureaucracy in August 2009, including by moving an unsuccessful motion in the Senate. Over the decade since 2012, Australia's score in the Corruption Perceptions Index from Transparency International slipped from 7th place in 2012 to a low of 18th in 2022, with public perception of corruption in Australia increasing. Beginning in January 2017, the Australia Institute actively advocated for establishing a federal anti-corruption body, starting with an open letter signed by 49 prominent Australians urging the Prime Minister to create such a watchdog. In October 2017, it supported the formation of the National Integrity Commission, a group of former judges dedicated to advancing this cause through research, education, and commentary. In 2017, a parliamentary committee reported on the establishment of a national integrity commission. In January 2018, Australian Labor Party (ALP) leader Bill Shorten pledged to establish a national integrity commission if elected.

=== Coalition proposals, 2018–2021 ===
Despite earlier dismissing the idea as a "fringe issue", in December 2018, prime minister Scott Morrison promised to establish an anti-corruption body if the Liberal-National Coalition won the 2019 election. The previous August, Griffith University researchers had laid out a plan for a Commonwealth Integrity Commission, and Attorney-General Christian Porter had been working on adapting the Australian Commission for Law Enforcement Integrity into an anti-corruption watchdog in the Turnbull government. The framework was criticised for its narrow remit and the decision not to allow public hearings, and not being allowed to take tip-offs, as well as the high burden of proof needed before an investigation can take place. Additionally, ministers would have to agree to allow an investigation into anything they were engaged with. The Morrison government was critical of the NSW ICAC model. The Morrison government model also did not give the CIC power to address "grey corruption" such as lobbying, bribery, political donations and the "revolving door", and was described as a "farce" by Anthony Whealy, a former New South Wales Court of Appeal judge. The Morrison government tabled an exposure draft in May 2022. During the 2022 election, Morrison stated that the legislation to establish the commission would only be introduced to parliament if the ALP committed to supporting it without amendment.

=== Crossbench proposals, 2018–2021 ===
Senator Larissa Waters amended a plan by former member for Indi Cathy McGowan which passed the Senate in 2018, refining the meaning of corrupt conduct and limiting the retrospective powers of a federal integrity body to 10 years. It was allowed to lapse in April 2022.

In 2020–2021, a bill was produced by Independent member for Indi Helen Haines to introduce a federal anti-corruption body known as the Australian Federal Integrity Commission, "responsible for the implementation of a national pro-integrity framework, with an emphasis on prevention". The bill was blocked in Parliament by the Coalition in November 2021. Liberal MP Bridget Archer crossed the floor to support it. By the time Haines introduced the bill, it had been refined by consultation with legal academics, panels of retired judges, civil society stakeholders, ethicists and MPs. It was allowed to lapse in April 2022. Labor said that it would draw on Haines' bill to inform its legislation, however the NACC has significant differences from Haines' bill.

== Legislative basis, structure and powers ==
Anthony Albanese led the Labor Party to victory in the 2022 federal election with an election promise to establish an anti-corruption watchdog. Albanese explicitly promised that the new body would have the power to investigate pork barrelling. In June 2022, a month after the election, newly appointed attorney-general Mark Dreyfus advertised roles in the NACC taskforce.

On 28 September 2022, the Albanese government introduced the National Anti-Corruption Commission Bill 2022 and National Anti-Corruption Commission (Consequential and Transitional Provisions) Bill 2022 to parliament. The introduction of the bills was delayed by the death of Queen Elizabeth II three weeks prior. Crossbenchers proposed that the scope of the NACC should extend to being able to investigate third parties getting in touch with politicians.

The bills to establish the National Anti-Corruption Commission passed the House of Representatives on 24 November 2022 and passed the Senate on 29 November 2022 after crossbench amendments were either withdrawn or defeated. On 12 December 2022, the bills received royal assent.

=== Organisational structure ===
The NACC is led by a commissioner, three deputy commissioners and a chief executive officer. The inaugural commissioner is Paul Brereton. One of the three deputy commissioners was Jaala Hinchcliffe, the integrity commissioner and head of the Australian Commission for Law Enforcement Integrity until the latter was absorbed into the NACC. Ms Hinchcliffe was responsible for transitioning ACLEI and it's investigations into the NACC. Hinchcliffe's appointment as a deputy commissioner was temporary until a permanent third deputy commissioner was appointed. All other leadership positions have a term of five years.

=== Powers ===
The NACC has the power to investigate Commonwealth ministers, public servants, statutory office holders, government agencies, parliamentarians, and personal staff of politicians. Non-government actors will not be covered. It is independent of government, with the power to initiate its own investigations as well as in response to tip-offs from referrals, including whistleblowers and the public.

The NACC is overseen by a statutory bipartisan Joint Standing Committee of the Parliament. It has the power to investigate retrospectively. It also has the power to hold public hearings when it is in the public interest, however, the NACC will hold private hearings by default. According to research by the Australia Institute, two-thirds of Australians (67%) support an anti-corruption commission having the power to conduct public hearings when it serves the public interest.

The NACC has the power to make findings of fact, including in relation to corrupt conduct, but is not a court and cannot make a finding of criminality. It does not have the power to remove members of parliament or other officials.

== Operational history ==
The NACC began operations on 1 July 2023. The commission received 44 referrals of corrupt conduct in its first two days of operation. It committed to publishing weekly updates on the number of referrals it has received along with the number of investigations open.

=== Robodebt six ===
On 7 July 2023, Catherine Holmes released her final report on the Royal Commission into the Robodebt Scheme, which investigated the unlawful debt recovery scheme in place from 2016 to 2020 that resulted in thousands of false or incorrectly calculated debt notices being sent to welfare recipients. In the report's final "sealed section", which was not released to the public, Holmes referred several individuals responsible for the scheme for further action from other agencies, including the NACC. On 6 June 2024, the NACC released a statement stating it would not carry out an investigation into six individuals referred to it by the Royal Commission, citing that further investigations would not produce "significant new evidence". This decision prompted fierce outcry, and the NACC received approximately 1,200 complaints from members of the public. Accordingly, the following week, NACC inspector Gail Furness announced an examination into the decision to not investigate the individuals, dubbed by the media as the "Robodebt six". On 30 October 2024, Furness released her report, which compelled the NACC to reconsider its decision to not investigate, and also found that commissioner Paul Brereton, whom had disclosed a "close assosciation" with one of the individuals referred, had not taken adequate steps to remove himself from the decision-making process. On 13 December 2024, former High Court Justice Geoffrey Nettle was appointed as an independent delegate to assess the case. On 18 February 2025, the NACC reversed its decision and announced an investigation into the Robodebt six.

== See also ==
- Corruption in Australia

=== State and territory anti-corruption commissions ===
- Independent Commission Against Corruption (New South Wales)
- Independent Broad-based Anti-corruption Commission (Victoria)
- Crime and Corruption Commission (Queensland)
- Independent Commission Against Corruption (South Australia)
- Corruption and Crime Commission (Western Australia)
- Integrity Commission (Tasmania)
- Independent Commissioner Against Corruption (Northern Territory)
