= Georgia Bureau of Investigation =

State law enforcement agency in U.S.

- Abbreviation: GBI
- Motto: Lex Et Ordo; Law and Order

Agency overview
- Formed: 1937; 89 years ago
- Employees: 888 state authorized positions (FY2024)
- Annual budget: $145,284,077 (FY24 State Funds)

Jurisdictional structure
- Operations jurisdiction: Georgia, United States
- Area: 59,425 square miles (153,910 km^{2})
- Population: 10,711,908 (2020)
- Legal jurisdiction: Statewide
- General nature: Civilian police

Operational structure
- Overseen by: Georgia Board of Public Safety
- Headquarters: DeKalb County; 33.6925297°N 84.2734381°W
- Agency executives: Chris Hosey, Director; Scott Dutton, Assistant Director

Website
- gbi.georgia.gov

The Georgia Bureau of Investigation (GBI) is the state bureau of investigation for the U.S. state of Georgia. Operating as an independent, statewide agency, the GBI provides specialized investigative support, forensic laboratory evaluations, and computerized criminal justice data infrastructure to Georgia's broader criminal justice system. The agency is headquartered in an unincorporated area of DeKalb County, Georgia, located near Decatur, Georgia within the Greater Atlanta metropolitan area.

== Organization ==
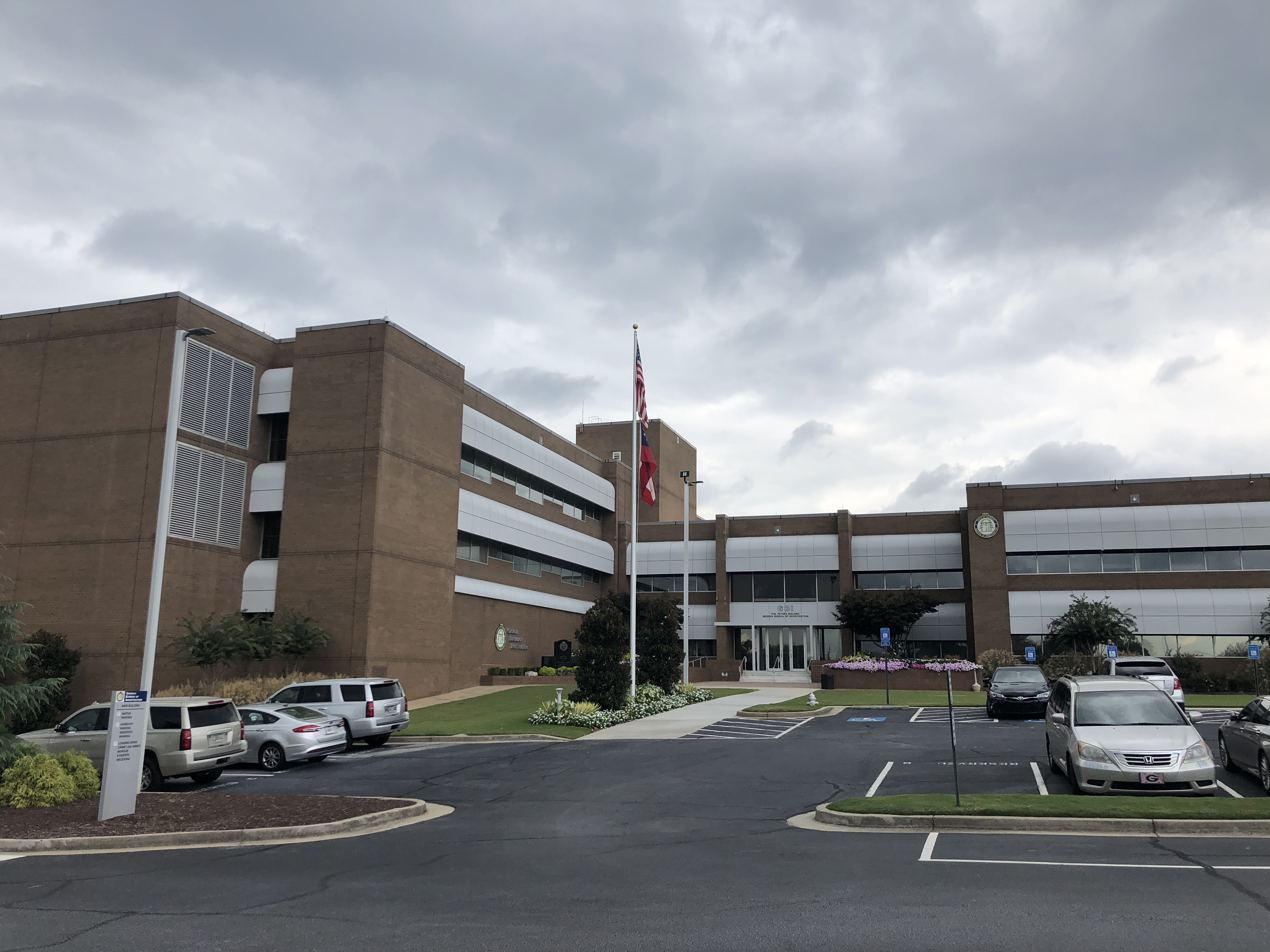
Georgia Bureau of Investigation Headquarters building in DeKalb County, Georgia

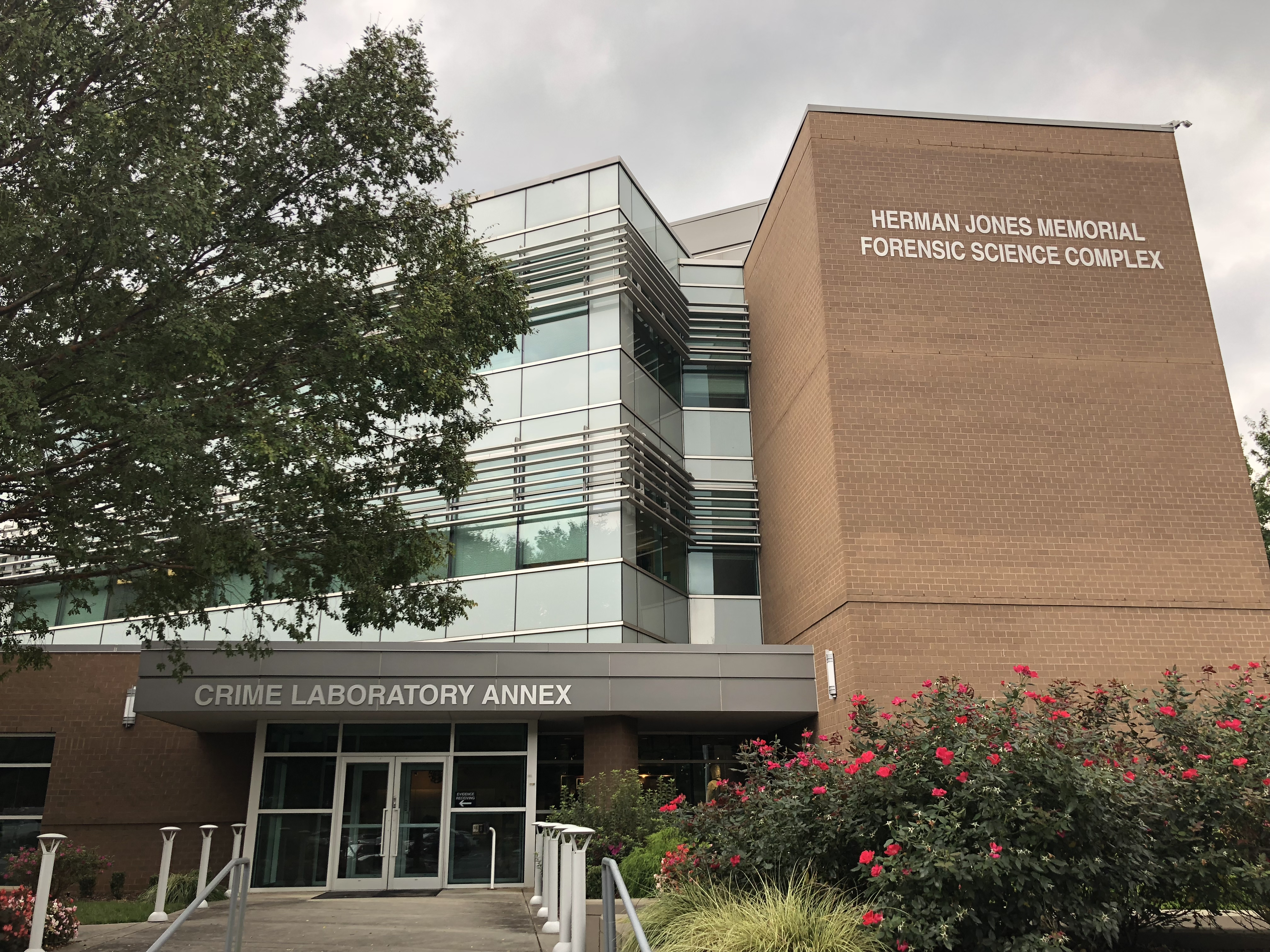
The State Crime Lab is located in another building at the same DeKalb County complex.

The Georgia Bureau of Investigation fulfills its statutory responsibilities through several dedicated operational divisions and specialized programs. Forensic services are anchored by the Division of Forensic Sciences (DOFS), which was established in 1952 to furnish scientific support and evidence analysis to law enforcement across the state. This system is complemented by the Medical Examiner's Office, overseen by the Chief Medical Examiner for the State of Georgia. The office provides forensic pathology services to 153 of Georgia's 159 counties for deaths falling under the jurisdiction of the Georgia Death Investigation Act, while establishing training guidelines for local coroners.

Information technology and data sharing are managed by the Georgia Crime Information Center (GCIC). Founded in 1973, the GCIC delivers round-the-clock technical communication networks to state agencies. The GCIC is legally responsible for maintaining the state's central computerized databases, which encompass the Georgia Sex Offender Registry, the GBI Crime Statistics Database, the Georgia Applicant Processing Service (GAPS), and regional criminal history record data.

The Investigative Division represents the primary enforcement arm of the bureau. Supervised by the Deputy Director for Investigations, the division coordinates regional offices, drug enforcement operations, and specialized tactical units. GBI Special Agents respond to direct requests for assistance from local law enforcement, judges, and prosecutors to investigate felony offenses such as homicides, sexual assaults, child abuse, and financial fraud. While general felony investigations require an external invitation of jurisdiction, the GBI maintains independent statutory authority to initiate narcotics investigations, state property crime inquiries, and investigations into use-of-force or misconduct incidents involving local officers. For example, the division regularly handles localized municipal investigations, such as the 2017 felony child abuse inquiry involving Poulan Police Department staff requested by the Tift Judicial Circuit District Attorney.

Administrative support is managed via Staff Services, which oversees property management, security personnel, telecommunications, and fleet assets. The bureau's fleet includes more than 500 emergency vehicles, with overall state assets valued in excess of $100 million. Specialized regulatory units within the bureau also manage civil assignments, such as state Bingo compliance regulations.

== History ==
The bureau trace its origins to March 1937, when Governor Eurith D. Rivers signed Act 220 to establish the Georgia Department of Public Safety. This legislation created the Georgia State Patrol alongside a plainclothes investigative unit named the Division of Identification, Detection, Prevention and Investigation. This division was formally renamed the Georgia Bureau of Investigation in 1940. During its early decades, the GBI held jurisdiction over crimes committed on state highways or state-owned properties, and acted as an auxiliary body to support local municipal agencies when requested.

In 1972, Governor Jimmy Carter introduced a sweeping executive restructure via the Executive Reorganization Act. Under the resulting legislative amendments passed on February 28, 1974, the GBI was completely separated from the Department of Public Safety and re-established as an independent, cabinet-level agency directly serving the state's criminal justice infrastructure.

== In popular culture ==
- In 2019, the GBI was featured in the second season of the Netflix crime drama series Mindhunter, which dramatized the agency's auxiliary role alongside federal investigators during the Atlanta child murders.
- The ABC television series Will Trent, adapted from the novel series by Karin Slaughter, centers on a fictionalized Special Agent working within the Investigative Division of the Georgia Bureau of Investigation.

== See also ==
- State bureau of investigation
- Federal Bureau of Investigation
