= Lexbase =

Swedish website and database

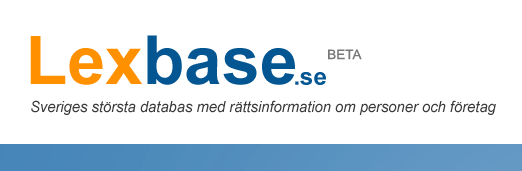
Lexbase's logotype from the website's main page

Lexbase is a Swedish website and database that was launched on 27 January 2014, enabling users to perform searches on people and companies who had been the subject of criminal charges or civil claims in Swedish courts. Cases are deleted from the Lexbase database after 20 years.

Lexbase owes its existence to Sweden's freedom of information principle (offentlighetsprincipen) for official documents, a right guaranteed by the Constitution of Sweden since 1766. The Principle of Public Access guarantees that official documents of government agencies can be accessed by the general public.

There has been a discussion in Sweden over whether the freedom of information principle is adequately adapted to the modern society, but since the principle is guaranteed in the Swedish constitution it is very difficult to change. Moreover, the freedom of information principle is a source of pride among Swedish decision makers and citizens, since it allows a very high degree of transparency. It was one of the major rights that Sweden was allowed to retain when it joined the European Union, one which Swedish EU negotiators fervently argued they should keep at the time.

Lexbase was closed down by the Internet service provider Bahnhof on 29 January 2014, just two days after launch, after the site came under heavy criticism from Swedish media, government and the general public.

Through a virtual server by the company City Networks, Lexbase was able to relaunch on 31 January 2014, however it was closed down once again within hours of becoming available. Since the beginning of April 2014, Lexbase is up and running again.

Lexbase not only provides access to a person's criminal record, but also to the verdict, judgment and sentencing.

== Complaints ==
After the website closure in February 2014, almost 300 complaints were recorded aiming to stop the service, claiming that it violates defamation laws. But since Lexbase is protected by the Principle of Public Access, the only possible prosecutor in this case would be the Chancellor of Justice. One of the main tasks of this state-run agency is "to ensure that the limits of the freedom of the press and other media are not transgressed and to act as sole prosecutor in cases concerning offences against the freedom of the press and the freedom of expression".

However, the Chancellor of Justice decided not to press charges against Lexbase. This decision was published at the end of March 2014. It was the main reason for Lexbase to reopen.

The decision of the Chancellor of Justice outraged many people in Sweden, especially those with a criminal record who soon realized that they would have to face a lot of problems in the future to find a job, a house or even a partner, and they now fear that they might be discriminated by many companies and institutions, including banks and medical healthcare. They think that the state has betrayed them. Some people say they even consider suicide.

Another organisation, ReclaimJustice, has appealed the decision of Chancellor of Justice Anna Skarhed and aims to bring Sweden into the European court of Justice, saying that it violates some fundamental human rights, i.e. Article 8 of the European Convention of Human rights.
