= Australian Commission for Law Enforcement Integrity =

Statutory agency overview
- Formed: 30 December 2006
- Dissolved: 1 July 2023
- Superseding statutory agency: National Anti-Corruption Commission
- Jurisdiction: Commonwealth of Australia
- Headquarters: Canberra, Australian Capital Territory
- Employees: 53 (2018)
- Website: www.aclei.gov.au

The Australian Commission for Law Enforcement Integrity (ACLEI) was an Australian government statutory agency, created under the Law Enforcement Integrity Commissioner Act 2006. Its role was to support the Law Enforcement Integrity Commissioner, detecting and preventing corruption in the Australian Criminal Intelligence Commission, the Department of Home Affairs including the Australian Border Force (ABF), the Australian Federal Police, Australian Transaction Reports and Analysis Centre (AUSTRAC) and aspects of the Department of Agriculture and Water Resources. It was replaced by the National Anti-Corruption Commission on 1 July 2023.

The last minister responsible for the agency was Mark Dreyfus, Attorney-General. ACLEI was headed by an Integrity Commissioner. The last Integrity Commissioner, and only woman to hold the position, was Jaala Hinchcliffe, who became a Deputy Commissioner for the NACC.

== Functions ==
Priority was given to investigations of serious and systemic corruption. ACLEI supported the Integrity Commissioner by collecting intelligence regarding corruption. The Integrity Commissioner was required to make recommendation to the federal government regarding improvements to legislation that will prevent corrupt practices or their early detection. Its role was far more limited than proposals for a National Anti-Corruption Commission, which was eventually established and replaced the ACLEI in July 2023.

== See also ==
- Law enforcement in Australia
