= Canadian Police Information Centre =

Canadian central policing database

The Canadian Police Information Centre (CPIC; French: Centre d'information de la police canadienne, CIPC) is a government database and crime information center that provides law enforcement agencies and approved government bodies in Canada with access to nationwide data on criminal records, wanted and missing persons, stolen property, vehicles, firearms, and a wide range of investigative and intelligence material.

Established in 1972 by the Royal Canadian Mounted Police (RCMP), CPIC is the only national law-enforcement networking system in Canada, ensuring that law enforcement members across all provinces and territories in Canada to have a consistent and real-time police database. Approximately three million files are generated annually, with contributing agencies responsible for maintaining the accuracy and integrity of their data.

== Overview ==
In order for a government agency to access CPIC, they must agree to abide by the rules set out in the CPIC Reference Manual and be approved by the CPIC Advisory Committee, composed of 26 senior police officers from municipal and provincial police forces, the Ontario Police Commission and the RCMP. Non-policing agencies must also enter a memorandum of understanding with the RCMP and may be audited from time to time for compliance.

CPIC is broken down into four data banks: Investigative, Identification, Intelligence and Ancillary which contain information on:

- Vehicles/marine
  - Stolen or abandoned vehicles/boats
- Persons
  - Wanted persons
  - People who are accused or indicted of crime(s)
  - Outstanding warrants
  - People on probation or parolees
  - Special Interest Police (SIP)
  - Judicial orders
  - Access to the Offender Management System of Correctional Service of Canada
  - Missing persons
- Stolen property
- Dental characteristics
- Canadian Firearms Registry of the Canadian Firearms Program
- Wandering Persons Registry
  - Alzheimer's disease patients who register with the Alzheimer Society of Canada in case they go missing
- CPIC criminal surveillance
  - Criminal intelligence gathered across the country

Local police services maintain their own databases separately from CPIC. For example, British Columbia uses PRIME-BC, Ontario agencies use systems such as NICHE and Versadex, Quebec uses the CRPQ system, and the RCMP uses the PROS system in provinces where it provides contract policing. Local records do not necessarily appear in CPIC unless they meet national criteria for entry.

== Disclosure ==
In accordance with the Automated Canada–United States Police Information Exchange System (ACUPIES) members of U.S law enforcement have real-time unrestricted access to Canada's CPIC interface. The interface allows U.S. law enforcement agencies to view records published on CPIC. Under the reciprocal members of law enforcement in Canada are also granted unrestricted access to state and federal U.S. criminal databases contained in the National Crime Information Center (NCIC).

== See also ==
- Police National Computer, an equivalent system used by British law enforcement agencies
