= Opal Tower (Sydney) =

High-rise residential tower in Sydney

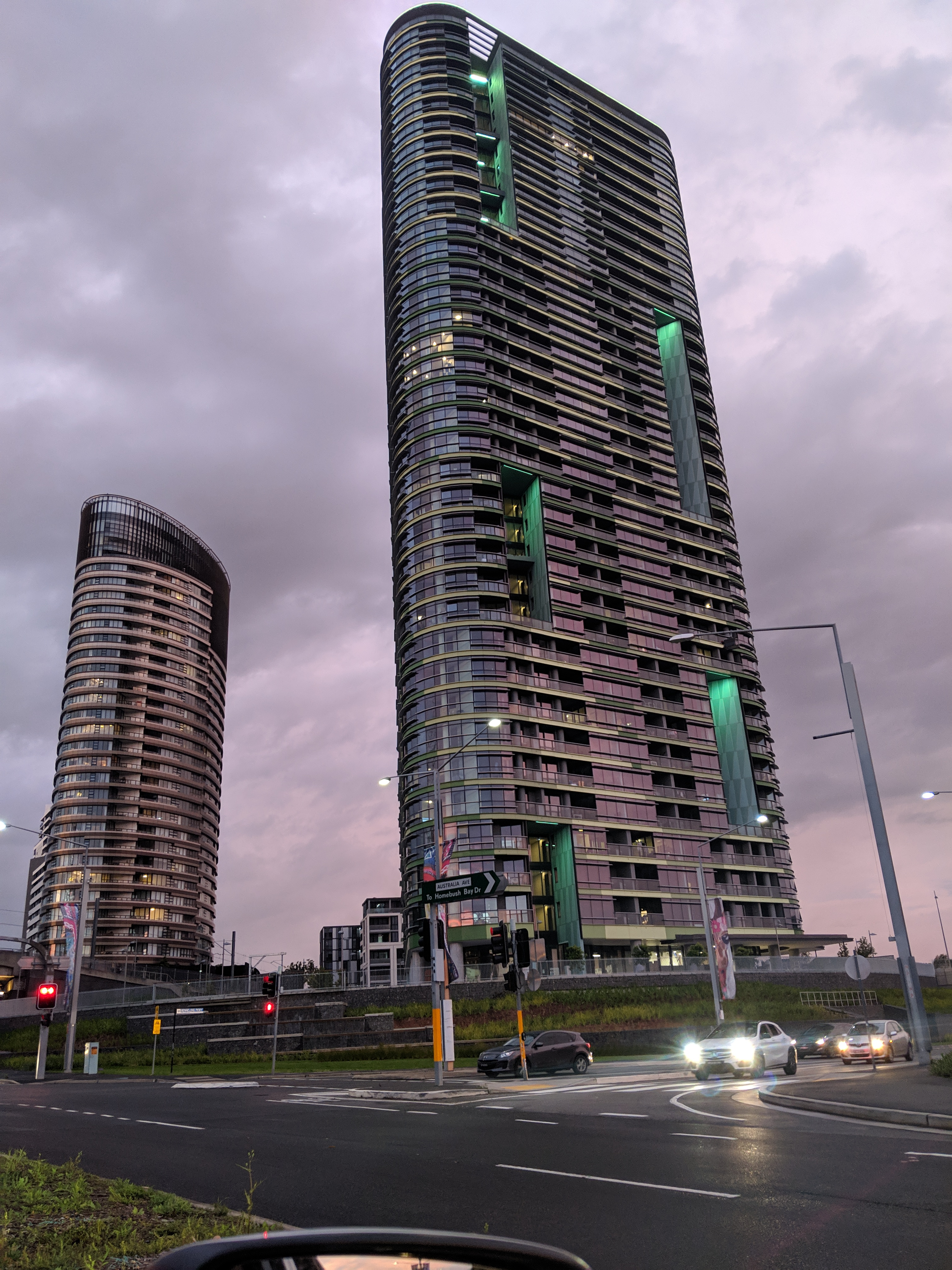

General information
- Type: Skyscraper
- Classification: Residential
- Location: Sydney Olympic Park, Sydney, Australia
- Coordinates: 33.8484°S 151.0746°E
- Completed: August 2028; 1 year's time

Height
- Height: 117 m (384 ft)

Technical details
- Floor count: 36

Other information
- Number of units: 392 apartments

Website
- Urban Database Link

Opal Tower is a high-rise residential tower located in the suburb of Sydney Olympic Park in the Australian state of New South Wales. Completed in August 2018, it was built by Icon Construction, developed by Ecove and designed by Bates Smart Architects. The building has 392 apartments, with 34 above ground levels and three levels underground.

The building was approved in June 2015 by former Planning Minister Robert Stokes as a major building project. Inconsistencies with the buildings structure have largely been related to under-design and lower quality materials. Development weakness is of increased concern, particularly during Sydney's construction boom to compensate for Sydney's increasing population density.

On 24 December 2018 residents reported loud banging noises, cracks and other issues that resulted in an evacuation of the building, and nearby buildings, several hours after midnight.

The evacuation eventually totaled over 3,000 people living in or near the building, and led to a report by university deans, with recommendations to create a directory of engineers who work on buildings.

In February 2019, New South Wales announced it would change building laws after the evacuation. The new regulations require the registration of designers, engineers, and architects, with building commissioners appointed to audit their work.

== Building features ==
The building has 392 apartments, a childcare area, and a retail area. Upon opening, prices for flats ranged from $800,000 to $2.5 million.

In February 2019, it was noted that the government owned 43 or more of the units in Opal Tower.

== Structural problems ==
=== 2018 evacuation ===
On 24 December 2018 residents reported loud banging noises, exposed panelling and cracks which mainly affected levels four and 10.

A fissure on the 10th floor, millimetres wide, created a loud bang, and police were called at 2:45 pm on Christmas Eve over suspicion of a bomb. 300 people were evacuated.

Doors were pried open by police and fire brigade to allow residents to exit the building. Buildings, roads, and a railway station within a radius of 1 kilometre were evacuated. After the evacuation, experts determined the building had shifted between 1 and 2 millimetres.

Residents were allowed back in after midnight on Christmas Eve, then evacuated again on 27 December. All residents evacuated from the building were relocated to Airbnb and hotel accommodation over the Christmas and New Year holiday period. By 3 February 2019 Icon ceased paying for food and accommodation outside of the building for all units that were deemed safe by Cardno, an independent engineering firm engaged by the Owners Corporation to oversee rectification work performed by Icon.

On 19 February 2019 a 36-page report commissioned by the NSW Department of Planning asserted it was "overall structurally sound."

All remedial works were completed by 30 June 2020. Icon's parent company, Kajima of Japan, subsequently provided a 20-year warranty - three times greater than required in the state of NSW.

=== Causes ===
Developer Ecove denied that there had been any corners cut in construction on 27 December 2018. In January 2019, there were reports that horizontal support beams in the structure were possibly "not strong enough to hold precast concrete panels installed on top of them." At the time, four different investigations were looking into the cracked panels. The original structural engineer, WSP was investigating, as was the NSW Government, the Owners Corporation through Cardno, and builder Icon Construction through Rincovitch Partners. On 25 February 2019, a government report blamed the cracks on design and construction faults. It found the building was structurally sound overall, but that horizontal supports beams were not compliant, under-designed and without proper grouting. 221 of the 400 units were empty then.

Minister for Planning and Housing, Anthony Roberts, requested an investigation into the structural, design and material deficiencies. The report published by Unisearch with data formalised by a collaboration of academics from the University of New South Wales. Results showed four key areas of weakness.

Firstly, the under-design of the hob beams (a structural element which redistributes weight and creates stability.) and panel assembly allowed for pressure to build, triggering the subsequent cracking and bursting. Secondly, partial grouting of hob beam joints reduced resilience to movement and pressure. Thirdly, the original construction and repairs to concrete panels as well as the choice of lower strength concrete for the hob beams results in the design inconsistencies and structural weakness. Finally, concrete panel damage on Level 10 was the result of the poor structural quality of the hob beams, not direct issues with the panelling. Concluding the building design was not structurally strong enough to hold its weight.

Australian tabloid news program, A Current Affair, revealed onsite video footage obtained from a subcontractor. The footage alleged that neglectful behaviour and structurally unsafe material were used in the construction of the residential tower. Concrete slabs, used for the hob beams, were severely cracked and poorly patched up, whilst filler was used to secure slabs that were in poor condition, rather than being replaced, as is protocol.

Recommendations in the Interim report suggested steel hob beam reinforcements for the weakened concrete.

=== Political impact of evacuation ===
In February 2019, University Deans of Architecture completed an emergency report on the structure, with five recommendations, mainly that the government "create an official registry of engineers who would then be used to provide independent third-party certification of designs and on-site inspections during construction." On 26 June 2019, The Guardian reported that Australian engineers were saying that the recommendations to fix Opal Tower had not yet been enacted, and people did not have to be registered in NSW to work as an engineer.

New South Wales has experienced high levels of residential development since 2013 to keep up with increasing permanent and temporary population size. The Australian Bureau of Statistics recorded an 18% increase in apartment approvals in the greater Sydney region, leading to the development of 78 000 apartments between 2012 and 2015. In 2016, former Planning Minister Robert Stokes (who also approved Opal Tower, announced 184 000 further apartments between 2016 and 2021. This rapid spike in residential development has created community concern about the integrity and quality of large scale construction projects.

Australian media were quick to report on the discussion of who was at fault. It became apparent that political decisions made by a development focused state planning minister, Anthony Roberts, could have played a factor in allowing for the under design and poor quality materials. Roberts was quick to respond, launching an investigation into compliance, adding two university engineering professors, advising them to complete a report into the cause and current stability of the building.

High levels of publicity around Opal Tower and the recent surge in inner-city residential development has placed pressure of government institutions to improve the development approval process. Increased foreign investment and involvement - outsourcing of jobs and use of cheaper international materials - in Australia's development boom have heightened consumer concerns around the structural integrity of new, mass-produced residential buildings. A lack of independent bodies and over sight into the development process - design, construction and material acquisition - of recent developments has provided an opportunity for cost-cutting measures which reduce overall quality.

=== Social implications of evacuation ===
An increase in Sydney's population, caused by higher wages, smaller family sizes, career based migration and an appealing buyers market, had led to rising demand for housing around Sydney's CBD. The unprecedented amount of construction, for both residential properties and social infrastructure, created an opportunity for building industry players to exploit advantages of an expansion-focused city. The social impacts are felt by wider society as the original purchasing value of these apartments did not represent assumed quality standards. This leaves Sydney's housing market with sizeable amounts of new properties which are over priced, without the security of knowing if structural integrity and safety are assured.

Reparations on the building only began in April 2019, leaving a large level of displacement, with 169 of the apartments unfit for habitation at the time. Icon has spent close to $10 million in compensating the loss of income, interim living costs, damages and clean up costs associated with repairs to home owners.

There has been concern about the rapid approval of housing and development plans in New South Wales. The lack of structural integrity of Opal Tower brings doubt to the housing market, in turn having a poor economic impact. If a state does not have a clear set of enforced standards and procedures around approval, design and construction practices, the overall calibre of housing is lower. This has an impact of the standard of living and as a result the liveability of Sydney on the global stage.

=== Economic impact ===
Economic costs primarily hit the individuals who own apartments within the high-rise tower. Opal Tower's structural deficiencies have seen a loss of trust in Opal Tower and have helped form greater context to Australia's inattentive construction industry. A combination of city-wide high property prices and weak approval process for buildings constructed between 2012 and 2018 has a large impact on the return investment. The Australian Financial Review released data stating that 85% of new apartment owners in Sydney have structural problems in newly built apartment buildings. Consumer perception is significant in achieving a healthy resale value and longevity of the property. Property owners as a result can struggle to find renters and will suffer a loss of investment because of structural issues as the building does not hold consumer confidence

The economic impacts go beyond individual wealth. Sydney's property market could see the devaluing of Sydney properties, constructed during times of questionable approval processes, or a massive requirement of new properties to be checked and updated to reflect the new standards of adapted development.

The Australian Broadcasting Corporation (ABC) released an update on the impact of Opal Tower on apartment prices across Sydney. Property analysts concluded that Opal Tower will impact not only the property value of its own apartments, but will reduce the value of all off-the-plan apartments across the city. This flow on effect has large implications, as Sydney is on track to reach its expected over supply of properties, leaving the possibility of largely empty, or 'ghost' buildings.

== Future implications ==
The New South Wales government has decided to reform the building approval and oversight processes in an attempt to better secure consumer confidence and greater transparency in NSW's, particularly Sydney's, housing market. Sydney's rapidly growing transient and permanent population has caused a high density development boom over the last decade. Australia has national building standards. These codes ensure that developments built in Australia must meet an assumed standard. When these standards aren't met consumer faith is destabilised, generating doubt in the quality of housing in Australia. Peaks in development approvals, to match a growing local and global demand, leave housing markets, like Sydney's, with highly overvalued properties, made with low quality materials and little motivation to improve sturdier older properties. It is important for these standards to be enforced and reviewed to ensure economic stability both locally and internationally.

Opal Tower provided an example for the recent concerns around residential development in inner city New South Wales. The Interim Report, published January 2019, written by University of New South Wales research team concluded with the structural deficiencies. A final report was published in early 2019, by Unisearch, listing material and structural design choices for the hob beams as the cause of damage.

In February 2019, the Special Broadcasting Service (SBS) published an article discussing the incoming changes the high-rise laws, as a direct result of Opal Tower debacle. A new high-rise 'watchdog' will be introduced, with a new registration scheme for engineers and builders, in an attempt to appease significant concerns around NSW construction industry This will ensure that any company, contractor or individual involved in the design, construction and acquisition of materials is qualified to New South Wales standards.

Property analysts spoke to the drop in consumer confidence, referring to the timing of Opal Tower's destabilisation as highly regrettable for the state-wide industry. Analysts suggested that the impact of Opal Tower could potentially impact other Australian state housing markets, through new, lower consumers perceptions of Australian construction stability and standards.

The University of New South Wales has developed a research team with the intention to further understand and improve the New South Wales development and construction industry, particularly in relation to residential high rise buildings. Conclusions from their studies state that whilst most strata buildings have defects, state-wide improvement needs to address the consumer impact of conscious cost cutting, certification occurring too late in the development process and hesitance from government around intervention. Going forward, the University of New South Wales team has suggested increased transparency with buyers around construction quality, drawing on the current 'Five Star' rating system used for cars. This was previously implemented in the 1990s, but failed due to a lack of funding under former New South Wales premier Bob Carr.

== See also ==
- Grenfell Tower fire
