= Australian Criminal Intelligence Commission =

Australian government agency

- ACIC program logo
- Abbreviation: ACIC

Agency overview
- Formed: 1 July 2016
- Preceding agencies: Australian Crime Commission; National Crime Authority; Bureau of Criminal Intelligence; Office of Strategic Crime Assessments; CrimTrac
- Employees: 768 (2017–2018)

Jurisdictional structure
- Operations jurisdiction: Australia
- Constituting instrument: Australian Crime Commission Amendment (National Policing Information) Act 2016

Operational structure
- Elected officer responsible: The Hon Tony Burke MP, Minister for Home Affairs
- Agency executive: Heather Cook, Chief Executive Officer
- Parent agency: Department of Home Affairs

Website
- www.acic.gov.au

The Australian Criminal Intelligence Commission (ACIC) is a law enforcement agency established by the Australian federal government on 1 July 2016, following the merger of the Australian Crime Commission (ACC) and CrimTrac. It has specialist investigative capabilities and delivers and maintains national information sharing systems. ACIC is part of the National Intelligence Community.

== History ==
=== Predecessors ===
On 1 January 2003, the Australian Crime Commission (ACC) was established under the Australian Crime Commission Act 2002, superseding the National Crime Authority (NCA), the Australian Bureau of Criminal Intelligence (ABCI) and the Office of Strategic Crime Assessments (OSCA).

CrimTrac was established as an agency in the Attorney-General's Department in 1990.

=== Establishment and legal framework ===
On 1 July 2016, the Australian Crime Commission Amendment (National Policing Information) Act 2016 (Cth) amended the ACC Act to implement the carrying over of CrimTrac's functions to the ACC, including the provision of systems and services relating to national policing information and nationally coordinated criminal history checks. It was formed to strengthen the country's response to crime affecting Australia.

As a Commonwealth statutory authority, the ACIC also has responsibilities under the Public Service Act 1999 and the Public Governance, Performance and Accountability Act 2013. The role and functions of the ACIC are underpinned by supporting legislation in each state and territory.

== Roles and functions ==
The mission is to make Australia safer through improved national ability to connect, discover, understand and respond to current and emerging crime threats, and criminal justice issues, including the ability for police and law enforcement to access essential policing knowledge and information. The organisation is uniquely equipped as Australia's national criminal intelligence agency with investigative, research and information delivery functions. The agency works closely with a broad range of national and international partners to achieve their purpose, while taking account of criminal threats to Australia, and stakeholders' needs, the ACIC creates a national intelligence picture of crime, targets serious and organised crime, delivers information capability and services to front line policing and law enforcement, and provides crime and justice research that produces an evidence base for addressing crime in Australia. They support and collaborate closely with the Australian Institute of Criminology (AIC), whose director is also that of the ACIC's CEO. The AIC undertakes criminological research, which helps inform law enforcement's collective response to crime. The AIC provides independent monitoring, and research programs that enhance knowledge of crime and criminal justice issues in Australia, and it also provides strategic advice to inform policy development and reform.

The ACIC works with law enforcement partners to improve the ability to stop criminals exploiting emerging opportunities and gaps in law enforcement information. They report to the Minister for Home Affairs, and is accountable to and monitored and reviewed by the Parliamentary Joint Committee on the Australian Criminal Intelligence Commission. The ACIC Board includes representatives of Commonwealth, state and territory law enforcement and key national security and regulatory agencies. The Board also provides strategic direction to the ACIC and is responsible for determining special operations and special investigations. They are subject to the jurisdiction of the Australian Commission for Law Enforcement Integrity (ACLEI), which is tasked with preventing, detecting and investigating law-enforcement related corruption issues.

The ACIC delivers information-sharing solutions between state, territory and federal law enforcement agencies including biometric matching, child protection, firearm services, police reference services, missing persons and domestic violence. The agency does this by bringing together essential law enforcement information from around the country and making it accessible to all Australian police and other law enforcement agencies. They also manage the National Police Checking Service, which service enables controlled access to disclosable police history information from all Australian police agencies. These capabilities are specifically designed to equip police with the information they need to investigate, solve and prevent crimes. This vital information can improve an officer's decision-making and contribute to a safer Australia. The ACIC's coercive powers are used in special operations and special investigations to obtain information where traditional law enforcement methods are unlikely to be or have not been effective, and similar to those of a Royal Commission, authorise examiners, who are appointed by the Governor General of Australia, to compel persons to give evidence for the purposes of special ACIC operations or investigations.

Examinations are conducted in private, witnesses at examinations are able to claim protection so that the answers, documents or things they provide are not admissible in evidence against them in a criminal proceeding or a proceeding for the imposition of a penalty except in limited circumstances. The coercive powers also authorise examiners to issue notices to be served on persons requiring them to produce documents or things relevant to a special operation or investigation. This power is broad, and a notice to produce may be issued to a person, a corporation or a Commonwealth government agency.

== Organisation ==
The ACIC head office is in the Australian Capital Territory, and the agency has regional offices in each state and the Northern Territory. There is an ACIC presence in each Australian state and territory, and in several international locations as well. The ACIC works together with state and territory crime task forces to reduce the threat of high-risk targets operating in and impacting Australia.

== Services ==
The ACIC has a variety of services at their disposal, such as Australian Cybercrime Online Reporting Network, Biometric and Forensic Services, Child protection, Firearms services, Domestic violence, National Criminal Intelligence System, and the National Police Checking Service.

== See also ==
- Crime in Australia
- List of Australian Commonwealth Government entities
- List of law enforcement agencies in Australia
- Australian Intelligence Community
- CrimTrac Agency
- Australian Priority Organisation Target
